= Louie Louie =

1957 single by Richard Berry

Single by Richard Berry
- A-side: "You Are My Sunshine"
- Written: 1956
- Released: April 1957
- Recorded: April 1956
- Studio: Hollywood Recorders
- Genre: Rhythm and blues
- Length: 2:09
- Label: Flip 321
- Songwriter: Richard Berry

Richard Berry singles chronology
"Take The Key" (1956)	"Louie Louie" (1957)	"Sweet Sugar You" (1957)

"Louie Louie" is a rhythm and blues song written, composed, and recorded by American musician Richard Berry in 1956 and released in 1957. In 1963, a version by the Kingsmen attracted controversy over allegedly profane lyrics. The song is based on the tune "El Loco Cha Cha" popularized by bandleader René Touzet and is an example of Afro-Cuban influence on American popular music.

The song's historical impact and ongoing popularity, attested by books, articles, rankings, and hundreds of cover versions, have earned it a reputation as "a cornerstone of rock".

"Louie Louie" tells, in simple verse–chorus form, the first-person story of a "lovesick sailor's lament to a bartender about wanting to get back home to his girl".

== Historical significance ==
The "extraordinary roller-coaster tale of obscurity, scandal, success and immortality" and "remarkable historical impact" of "Louie Louie" have been recognized by organizations and publications worldwide. A partial list (see Recognition and rankings table below) includes the Rock and Roll Hall of Fame, the Grammy Hall of Fame, National Public Radio, VH1, Rolling Stone Magazine, the National Endowment for the Arts, and the Recording Industry Association of America. Other major examples of the song's legacy include the celebration of International Louie Louie Day every year on April 11; the annual Louie Louie Parade in Philadelphia from 1985 to 1989; the LouieFest in Tacoma from 2003 to 2012; the ongoing annual Louie Louie Street Party in Peoria; and the unsuccessful attempt in 1985 to make it the state song of Washington.

Dave Marsh in his book Louie Louie: The History and Mythology of the World's Most Famous Rock 'n' Roll Song wrote, "It is the best of songs, it is the worst of songs", and also labeled it "cosmically crude". Rock critic Greil Marcus called it "a law of nature" and New York Times music critic Jon Pareles, writing in a 1997 obituary for Richard Berry, termed it "a cornerstone of rock". Music historian Peter Blecha noted, "Far from shuffling off to a quiet retirement, evidence indicates that 'Louie Louie' may actually prove to be immortal." Although the song "surely resists learned exegesis", other writers described it as "musically simple, lyrically simple, and joyously infectious", "deliciously moronic", "a completely unforgettable earworm", "the essence of rock's primal energy", and "the immortal international hit ... that defines rock 'n' roll."

A San Francisco Chronicle editorial proclaimed, "'Louie Louie's'" familiar opening—a simple three-chord riff—has been compared to Beethoven's Fifth Symphony for sheer familiarity and staying power." Others noted that it "served as a bridge to the R&B of the past and the rap scene of the future", that "it came to symbolize the garage rock genre, where the typical performance was often aggressive and usually amateurish", and that "all you need to make a great rock 'n' roll record are the chords to 'Louie Louie' and a bad attitude."

Music historian and filmmaker Eric Predoehl of The Louie Report described the song as,

Purity. It's just a very pure, honest rock 'n' roll song. It's a song of romantic ideals hidden amongst a three-chord melody. It's an idealistic song. It's a misunderstood song. It's a confusing and disorienting song. It's like a heartbeat.

Humorist Dave Barry (with perhaps some exaggeration) called it "one of the greatest songs in the history of the world". American Songwriter summarized, "It might be the best-known rock song of all time. It might be the most important rock song of all time."

The Kingsmen's recording was the subject of an FBI investigation about the supposed, but nonexistent, obscenity of the lyrics that ended without prosecution. The nearly unintelligible (and innocuous) lyrics were widely misinterpreted, and the song was banned by radio stations. Marsh wrote that the lyrics controversy "reflected the country's infantile sexuality" and "ensured the song's eternal perpetuation", while another writer termed it "the ultimate expression of youthful rebellion". Jacob McMurray in Taking Punk To The Masses noted, "All of this only fueled the popularity of the song ... imprinting this grunge ur-message onto successive generations of youth, ... all of whom amplified and rebroadcast its powerful sonic meme ...."

== Original version by Richard Berry and the Pharaohs ==
Richard Berry was inspired to write the song in 1956 after listening to an R&B interpretation of "El Loco Cha Cha" performed by the Latin group Ricky Rillera and the Rhythm Rockers. The tune was written originally as "Amarren Al Loco" ("Tie Up The Madman" or "Tie Up That Lunatic") by Cuban bandleader Rosendo Ruiz Jr. (also known as Rosendo Ruiz Quevedo), but became best known in the "El Loco Cha Cha" arrangement by René Touzet which included "three great chords, solid and true" and a ten-note "1-2-3 1–2 1-2-3 1–2" tumbao or rhythmic pattern. The "unforgettable hook" of "Louie Louie" was lifted directly from Touzet's composition.

"Louie Louie" 10-note riff

In Berry's mind, the words to "Louie Louie" "just kind of fell out of the sky", superimposing themselves over the repeating bassline as he scribbled backstage on a strip of toilet paper. Lyrically, the first person perspective of the song was influenced by "One for My Baby (And One More for the Road)", which is sung from the perspective of a customer talking to a bartender ("Louie" was the name of Berry's bartender). He additionally cited Chuck Berry's "Havana Moon" and his own exposure to Latin American music for the song's speech pattern and references to Jamaica.

Los Angeles-based Flip Records recorded Berry's composition with his vocal group the Pharaohs in April 1956. The Pharaohs were Godoy Colbert (first tenor), Stanley Henderson (second tenor, subbing for Robert Harris), and Noel Collins (baritone). Gloria Jones of the Dreamers provided additional backup vocals. Session musicians included Plas Johnson on tenor sax, Jewel Grant on baritone sax, Ernie Freeman on piano, Irving Ashby on guitar, Red Callender on bass, Ray Martinez on drums, and John Anderson on trumpet.

78 RPM release

Flip released the record in April 1957 with "Louie Louie" as the B-side of "You Are My Sunshine", but prior to the song's release, Berry sold his portion of the publishing and songwriting rights for "Louie Louie" and four other songs for $750 to Max Feirtag, the head of Flip Records, to raise cash for his upcoming wedding. Both 7-inch 45 RPM and 10-inch 78 RPM versions were pressed. (An early 45 RPM label misprint exists, reported by Steve Propes, with the title rendered as "Louie Lovie".)

A Cash Box review rated the A-side as a B+, but the B-side only rated a B with the comment, "Richard Berry chants a middle beat with a steady, syncopated rhythm that captures an excitement." Local A-side airplay was modest, but then KGFJ deejay Hunter Hancock flipped the record and put the B-side in heavy rotation, resulting in a regional hit, particularly in San Francisco. When Berry toured the Pacific Northwest, local R&B bands began to play the song, increasing its popularity. The song was re-released by Flip in 1961 as an A-side single and again in 1964 on a four-song EP, but never appeared on any of the national charts. Sales estimates ranged from 40,000 to 130,000 copies.

Other versions appeared on Casino Club Presents Richard Berry (1966), Great Rhythm and Blues Oldies Volume 12 (1977), and The Best of Louie, Louie (1983). Although similar to the original, the version on Rhino's 1983 The Best of Louie, Louie compilation is actually a note-for-note re-recording (with backup vocals by doo wop revival group Big Daddy) created because licensing could not be obtained for Berry's 1957 version. The original version was included on a 1986 Swedish compilation, but not until the Ace Records Love That Louie release in 2002 did it see wide distribution.

In the mid-1980s, Berry was living on welfare. Drinks company California Cooler wanted to use "Louie Louie" in a commercial, but discovered it needed Berry's consent because despite having sold the publishing rights, he still owned the radio and television performance rights. The company asked the Artists Rights Society to locate him which led to Berry's taking legal action to regain his rights to the song. The settlement made Berry a millionaire.

While the title of the song is often rendered with a comma ("Louie, Louie"), in 1988, Berry told Esquire magazine that the correct title of the song was "Louie Louie" with no comma.

The copyright for Richard Berry's "Louie Louie" was acquired by EMI Music Publishing from Windswept Pacific in 1999.

== Cover versions ==
"Louie Louie" is the world's most recorded rock song, with published estimates ranging from over 1,600 to more than 2,000 "with ever more still being released and performed" (and uploaded to music and video websites). Due to its "raw, open structure that invites interpretation, mishearing and reinvention", it has been recorded and performed by a wide range of artists spanning reggae, hard rock, jazz, psychedelic, hip-hop, easy listening, and more. Peter Doggett labeled it "almost impossible to play badly" and Greil Marcus asked, "Has there ever been a bad version of 'Louie Louie'?" Paul Revere summarized, "Three chords and the most mundane beat possible. Any idiot could learn it, and they all did."

The Kingsmen version in particular has been cited as the "Rosetta Stone" of garage rock, the defining "ur-text" of punk rock, and "the original grunge classic". "The influential rock critics Dave Marsh and Greil Marcus believe that virtually all punk rock can be traced back to a single proto-punk song, 'Louie Louie'."

Pronunciation has varied widely from Berry's original "Lou-ee Lou-ee" to "Lou-ee Lou-eye" (Kingsmen, 1963), "Lou-ee Lou-eye-ay" (Angels, 1964), "Lou-eye Lou-way" (Sonics, 1966; Iggy Pop, 1972), "Lou-ee-a Lou-way" (Kinks, 1964; Motörhead, 1978), "Lou-way Lou-way" (Clarke/Duke Project, 1981), and others.

=== 1950s ===
Richard Berry was on the underbill for a concert in the Seattle–Tacoma area in September 1957 and his record appeared on local radio station charts in November 1957 after "African American DJs Bob Summerrise and Eager Beaver started playing it on their radio shows". Local R&B musicians Ron Holden and Dave Lewis popularized "Louie Louie", rearranging Berry's version and performing it at live shows and "battle of the bands" events.

Holden recorded an unreleased version, backed by the Thunderbirds, for the Nite Owl label in 1959. As a leader of the "dirty but cool" Seattle R&B sound, he would often substitute mumbled, "somewhat pornographic" lyrics in "a live tour de force [that] often lasted ten minutes or longer, devastating local audiences." Lewis, "the singularly most significant figure on the Pacific Northwest's nascent rhythm & blues scene in the 1950s and 1960s", released a three chord clone, "David's Mood - Part 2", that was a regional hit in 1963.

The Wailers, Little Bill and the Bluenotes, the Frantics, Tiny Tony and the Statics, Merrilee and the Turnabouts, and other local groups soon added the song to their set lists.

=== 1960s ===
==== Rockin' Robin Roberts and the Wailers (1961) ====
"Louie Louie"

Single by Rockin' Robin Roberts
- B-side: "Maryanne"
- Released: 1961
- Recorded: 1960
- Genre: Rhythm and blues; rock and roll
- Length: 2:40 single, 2:32 album
- Label: Etiquette ET-1
- Songwriter: Richard Berry

Robin Roberts developed an interest in rock 'n' roll and rhythm and blues records as a high school student in Tacoma, Washington. Among the songs he began performing as an occasional guest singer with a local band, the Bluenotes, in 1958 were "Louie Louie", which he had "rescued from oblivion" after hearing Berry's obscure original single, and Bobby Day's "Rockin' Robin", which gave him his stage name.

In 1959, Roberts left the Bluenotes and began singing with another local band, the Wailers, famed for their "hard-nosed R&B/rock fusion". Known for his dynamic onstage performances, Roberts added "Louie Louie" to the band's set and, in 1960 recorded the track with the Wailers as his backing band. The arrangement, devised by Roberts with the band, was "the first-ever garage version of 'Louie Louie'" and included "one of the true great moments of rock", his ad-libbed "Let's give it to 'em, RIGHT NOW!!" before the guitar solo.

Released as a single on the band's own label, Etiquette, in early 1961, it became a huge hit locally, charting at No. 1 on Seattle's KJR and establishing "Louie Louie" as "the signature riff of Northwest rock 'n' roll". It also picked up play across the border in Vancouver, British Columbia, appearing in the top 40 of the CFUN chart. The popularity of the Roberts release effectively buried another "reasonably close to the Richard Berry/Ron Holden arrangement" version put out at about the same time by Little Bill Englehardt (Topaz T-1305).

The record was then reissued and promoted by Liberty Records in Los Angeles, but it failed to chart nationally. The track was included on the 1963 album The Wailers & Co, the 1964 compilation album Tall Cool One, the 1998 reissue of the 1962 album The Fabulous Wailers Live at the Castle, and multiple later compilations.

Roberts was killed in an automobile accident in 1967, but his "legacy would reverberate down through the ages". Dave Marsh dedicated his 1993 book, "For Richard Berry, who gave birth to this unruly child, and Rockin' Robin Roberts, who first raised it to glory."

==== The Kingsmen (1963) ====
"Louie Louie"
- Original release

Single by the Kingsmen

from the album The Kingsmen in Person
- B-side: "Haunted Castle"
- Released: June 1963 (Jerden); October 1963 (Wand)
- Recorded: April 6, 1963
- Studio: Northwestern Inc.
- Genre: Garage rock; proto-punk; rhythm and blues
- Length: 2:42 (Jerden), 2:24 (Wand)
- Label: Jerden 712, Wand 143
- Songwriter: Richard Berry
- Producers: Ken Chase; Jerry Dennon

The Kingsmen singles chronology
"Louie Louie" (1963)	"Money" (1964)

Wand Re-issue
- Second Wand release with "Lead vocal by Jack Ely" text

On April 6, 1963, the Kingsmen, a rock and roll group from Portland, Oregon, chose "Louie Louie" for their second recording. (Note: The first Kingsmen recording was an unreleased acetate of "Peter Gunn Rock".) The session took place at Northwestern Inc. Motion Pictures & Recording Studios at 411 SW 13th Avenue in Portland. (Note: On July 2, 1993, a bronze historical marker was installed at the site by the Oregon Historical Society to commemorate the event. The marker disappeared shortly afterward. On September 5, 2013, the City of Portland dedicated a replacement plaque at the site. It was removed in 2015 after vandalism and theft attempts.) The one hour session, originally intended to produce an audition tape for a summer cruise ship gig, cost either $36, $50, or somewhere in between, and the band split the cost.

The session was produced by Ken Chase, a local disc jockey on the AM rock station KISN who also owned The Chase, the teen nightclub where the Kingsmen were the house band. The engineer for the session was the studio owner, Robert Lindahl. The Kingsmen's lead vocalist, Jack Ely, based his version on the recording by Rockin' Robin Roberts with the Fabulous Wailers, but unintentionally reintroduced Berry's original stop-time rhythm as he showed the other members how to play it with a 1–2–3, 1–2, 1–2–3 beat instead of the 1–2–3–4, 1–2, 1–2–3–4 beat on the Wailers record. The night before their recording session, the band played a 90-minute version of the song during a gig at a local teen club. The Kingsmen's studio version was recorded in one partial and one full take. They also recorded "Jamaica Farewell" and what became the B-side of the release, an original "surf instrumental" by Ely and keyboardist Don Gallucci called "Haunted Castle".

The Kingsmen's version with its "ragged", "sloppy", "chaotic", "shambolic, lumbering style", complete with "manic lead guitar solo, insane cymbal crashes, generally slurred and unintelligible lyrics", transformed the earlier Rockin' Robin Roberts version on which it was based into a "bumbling, bear-in-a-china-shop", "gloriously incoherent", "raw and raucous" "stomping garage-rocker" "so wrong it's right". Ely had to stand on tiptoe to sing into a boom mike, and his braces further impeded his "sinew-stretching", "giraffe-neck gabble" singing. The result was a "raw and unsanitized, unmanaged and unscrubbed" effort that the group hated but manager Ken Chase loved. Jerry Dennon's local Jerden label was contracted to press 1,000 vinyl 45s.

The guitar break is triggered by a shout, "Okay, let's give it to 'em right now!", both lifted from the Roberts version. Critic Dave Marsh suggests it is this moment that gives the recording greatness:

[Ely] went for it so avidly you'd have thought he'd spotted the jugular of a lifelong enemy, so crudely that, at that instant, Ely sounds like Donald Duck on helium. And it's that faintly ridiculous air that makes the Kingsmen's record the classic that it is...

Thurston Moore of Sonic Youth, whose "passion for music was ignited by the Kingsmen's 'Louie Louie'", termed it a "totem of magic", and recalled that "the lead singer's [Ely] voice had the air of a boy smoking a cigarette with one hand while banging a tambourine in the other, an insolent distance to his delivery, a vision of being at once boss and bored."

Dave Marsh ranked the song as No. 11 out of the 1001 greatest singles ever made, describing it as "the most profound and sublime expression of rock and roll's ability to create something from nothing". The Independent in Britain noted that it reinforced "a growing suspicion that enthusiasm was more important to rock 'n' roll than technical competence or literal meaning", and Jarvis Cocker added that "you can't tell a word of what the singer is singing and it doesn't matter".

Music producer and historian Alec Palao wrote,

This is truly the quintessential garage band moment, an audio-vérité snapshot that communicates directly what red-blooded grass roots American rock 'n' roll is all about ... the Kingsmen's "Louie Louie" spills forth with a rush of teenage hormones: raw, untutored, yet seemingly ready to take on the world.

Albin J. Zak in The Poetics of Rock commented,

What makes the Kingsmen's "Louie Louie" a good record? Neither lyrics nor melodic design, harmonic motion, rhythmic groove, or instrumental arrangement—all of which can be represented in some fashion apart from the record (though the lyrics would be at best an approximation)—hold the key to the answer. The record's power is in its sound, which represents multiple elements, processes, and voices—song, arrangement, sounds, techniques of sound recording and processing, musical performances, and all the particular ephemeral nuances that attend the moment of inscription. What is, from a certain perspective, mind-numbingly simple is in fact a complex network of phenomenal elements that we perceive as a whole.

A significant error on the Kingsmen version occurred just after the lead guitar break. As the group was going by the Wailers version, which had a restatement of the riff twice over before the lead vocalist came back in, it would be expected that Ely would do the same. Ely, however, missed his mark, coming in too soon before the second restatement of the riff. He realized his mistake and stopped the verse short, but the band did not realize that he had done so. As a quick fix, drummer Lynn Easton covered the pause with a drum fill. The error "imbued the Kingsmen recording with a touching humility and humanity" and is now so well known that multiple versions by other groups duplicate it.

First released in May 1963, the single was initially issued by the small Jerden label, before being picked up by the larger Wand Records in October 1963. Wand president Florence Greenberg said, "it was forced down my throat by friends. I was ashamed to put it out." Herb Alpert and A&M Records passed on the distribution opportunity, deeming it "too long" and "out of tune".

Sales of the Kingsmen record were initially so low (reportedly 600) that the group considered disbanding. Things changed when Boston's biggest DJ, Arnie Ginsburg, was given the record by a pitchman. Amused by its slapdash sound, he played it on his program as "The Worst Record of the Week". Despite the slam, listener response was swift and positive.

On October 19, it was listed in Billboard as a regional breakout in Boston and the following week as a "bubbling under" entry at No. 132 on the national chart. Meanwhile, the Raiders version, with far stronger promotion, was becoming a hit in California and was also listed as "bubbling under" one week after the Kingsmen debuted on the chart. For a few weeks, the two singles appeared destined to battle each other, but demand for the Kingsmen single, backed by national promotion from Wand, acquired momentum and by the end of 1963, Columbia Records had stopped promoting the Raiders version.

It entered the Billboard Hot 100 chart at No. 83 on November 2, moved into the top ten on December 7, and peaked at No. 2 the following week, a spot it held for six non-consecutive weeks. It would remain in the top ten throughout December 1963 and January 1964 before dropping off in early February. In total, the Kingsmen's version spent 16 weeks on the Hot 100, selling a million copies by April 1964. The Singing Nun's "Dominique" and Bobby Vinton's "There! I've Said It Again" prevented the single from reaching No. 1 (although Marsh asserts that it "far outsold" the other records, but was denied Billboard's top spot due to lack of "proper decorum".) "Louie Louie" did reach No. 1 on the Cash Box and Music Vendor/Record World pop charts, as well as No. 1 on the Cash Box R&B chart. In Canada it was No. 1 for three weeks beginning December 30, 1963. It was the last No. 1 on Cash Box before Beatlemania hit the United States with "I Want to Hold Your Hand". The Kingsmen version quickly became a standard at teen parties in the U.S. during the 1960s and, reaching No. 26 on the UK Singles Chart, was the preferred tune for a popular British dance called "The Shake". The first album, The Kingsmen in Person, peaked at No. 20 in 1964 and remained on the charts for over two years (131 weeks total) until 1966.

Due to the lyrics controversy and supported by the band's heavy touring schedule, the single continued to sell throughout 1965 and, after being reissued in 1966 as "Louie Louie 64-65-66", briefly reappeared on the charts, reaching No. 65 in Cash Box, No. 76 in Record World, No. 97 in Billboard, and cracking the Top 40 in the Washington market. Total sales estimates for the single range from 10 million to over 12 million with cover versions accounting for another 300 million.

Another factor in the success of the record may have been the rumour that the vocals were intentionally slurred by the Kingsmen to cover up lyrics that were allegedly laced with profanity, graphically depicting sex between the sailor and his lady. Crumpled pieces of paper professing to be "the real lyrics" to "Louie Louie" circulated among teens. The song was banned on many radio stations and in many places in the United States, including Indiana, where a ban was requested by Governor Matthew Welsh. These actions were taken despite the fact that practically no one could distinguish the actual lyrics. Denials of chicanery by Kingsmen and Ely did not stop the controversy. The FBI started a 31-month investigation into the matter and concluded they were "unable to interpret any of the wording in the record." However, drummer Lynn Easton later admitted that he yelled "fuck" after fumbling a drum fill at 0:54 on the record.

By the time the Kingsmen version had achieved national popularity, the band had split. Two rival editions—one featuring lead singer Jack Ely, the other with Lynn Easton who held the rights to the band's name—were competing for live audiences across the country. A settlement was reached later in 1964 giving Easton the right to the Kingsmen name but requiring all future pressings of the original version of "Louie Louie" to display "Lead vocal by Jack Ely" on the label. Ely released "Love That Louie" (as Jack E. Lee and the Squires) in 1964 and "Louie Louie '66" and "Louie Go Home" (as Jack Ely and the Courtmen) in 1966 without chart success. He re-recorded "Louie Louie" in 1976 and again in 1980, and these versions appear on multiple 60s hit compilations credited to "Jack Ely (formerly of the Kingsmen)" or "re-recordings by the original artists". Ely's 1990 album The Kingsman included three additional versions: "Louie Louie", "Louie Louie (Cali 86)", and "Ska Louie".

Subsequent Kingsmen "Louie Louie" versions with either Lynn Easton or Dick Peterson as lead vocalist appeared on Live & Unreleased (recorded 1963, released 1992), Live at the Castle (recorded 1964, released 2011), Shindig! Presents Frat Party (VHS, recorded 1965, released 1991), 60s Dance Party (1982), California Cooler Presents Cooler Hits (recorded 1986, released 1987), The Louie Louie Collection (as the Mystery Band, 1994), Red, White & Rock (2002), Garage Sale (recorded 2002, released 2003), and My Music: '60s Pop, Rock & Soul (DVD, 2011). A solo version by Peterson was also included on the 1999 Circle of Friends, Volume 1 CD.

On November 9, 1998, after a protracted lawsuit that lasted five years and cost $1.3 million, the Kingsmen were awarded ownership of all their recordings released on Wand Records from Gusto Records, including "Louie Louie". They had not been paid royalties on the songs since the 1960s.

Jack Ely's death on April 28, 2015, was reported by news services, newspapers, and broadcast networks around the world. His son commented that "my father would say, 'We were initially just going to record the song as an instrumental, and at the last minute I decided I'd sing it.'" When it came time to do that, however, Ely discovered the sound engineer had raised the studio's only microphone several feet above his head. Then he placed Ely in the middle of his fellow musicians, all in an effort to create a better "live feel" for the recording. The result, Ely would say over the years, was that he had to stand on his toes, lean his head back and shout as loudly as he could just to be heard over the drums and guitars.

When Mike Mitchell died on April 16, 2021, he was the only remaining member of the Kingsmen's original lineup who still performed with the band. His "Louie Louie" guitar break has been called "iconic", "blistering", and "one of the most famous guitar solos of all time". Guitar Player magazine noted, "Raw, lightning-fast, and loud, the solo's unbridled energy helped make the song a No. 2 pop hit, but also helped set the template for garage-rock – and later hard-rock – guitar."

Citing it as "the only piece of pop music I can remember from my youth", British writer Peter Ackroyd selected the Kingsmen's "Louie Louie", along with works by Beethoven, Bach, and Prokofiev as music selections on the BBC Radio 4 show, Desert Island Discs. British newspaper The Independent in 2015 declared it the "party anthem of the universe". Paste Magazine in 2018 said, "There is no other song as essential to the garage rock genre ... and no one else made it nearly as notable as The Kingsmen did."

In 2014, the copyright for the Kingsmen's version was acquired by Reservoir Media from First State Media Group.

===== Certifications =====
Region	Certification	Certified units/sales
New Zealand (RMNZ)	Gold	15,000^{‡}
United Kingdom (BPI)	Silver	200,000^{‡}
^{‡} Sales+streaming figures based on certification alone.

==== Paul Revere & the Raiders (1963) ====
"Louie Louie"
- Original release

Single by Paul Revere & the Raiders

from the album Here They Come!
- B-side: "Night Train"
- Released: May 1963 (Sandē); June 1963 (Columbia)
- Recorded: April 1963
- Studio: Northwestern Inc.
- Length: 2:38
- Label: Sandē 101, Columbia 4-42814
- Songwriter: Richard Berry
- Producer: Roger Hart

Paul Revere & the Raiders singles chronology
"So Fine" (1963)	"Louie Louie" (1963)	"Louie Go Home" (1963)

National release

Shortly after the Kingsmen, Paul Revere & the Raiders recorded a "cleaner, more accomplished" "soulful version" of "Louie Louie" in the same Portland studio. Sources concur that the Kingsmen session was first, but differ on the Raiders recording date. (Note: Timing of the Raiders session date varies from one day after the Kingsmen, two days (Mark Lindsay, 2011), three days (Mark Lindsay, 2015), five days, and seven days. Steve West's 2020 biography gives April 29th as the Raiders recording date based on "CBS archives", but the CBS receipt date was likely much later than the recording date.)

Personnel included Mark Lindsay (sax, vocals), Steve West (guitar), and Mike Smith (drums) with Paul Revere subbing on bass. The recording was paid for and produced by KISN radio personality Roger Hart, who soon became personal manager for the band. Released on Hart's Sandē label and plugged on his radio show, their version was more successful locally. Columbia Records issued the single nationally in June 1963 and it went to No. 1 in the West and Hawaii, but only reached No. 103 on the Billboard Bubbling Under Hot 100 chart. The quick success of "Louie Louie" faltered, however, due to lack of support from Columbia and its A&R man Mitch Miller, a former bandleader (Sing Along With Mitch) with "retrogressive taste" who disliked the "musical illiteracy" of rock and roll.

The Raiders version opened with Lindsay's saxophone intro followed by Smitty's exhortation to "Grab yo woman, it's-a 'Louie Louie' time!". Another signature phrase was "Stomp and shout and work it on out". Lyrically, only the first verse was used with Lindsay improvising the remaining vocals. The original version also contains a scarcely audible "dirty lyric" when Lindsay says, "Do she fuck? That psyches me up!" behind the guitar solo.

Robert Lindahl, president and chief engineer of NWI and sound engineer on both the Kingsmen and Raiders recordings, stated that the Raiders version was not known for "garbled lyrics" or an amateurish recording technique, but, as one author noted, their "more competent but uptight take on the song" was less exciting than the Kingsmen's version.

Live versions were included on Here They Come! (1965), Paul Revere Rides Again! (1983), The Last Madman of Rock and Roll (1986, DVD), and Mojo Workout! (2000). Later releases featured different lead vocalists on Special Edition (1982, Michael Bradley), Generic Rock & Roll (1993, Carlo Driggs), Flower Power (2011, Darren Dowler), and The Revolutionary Hits of Paul Revere & the Raiders (2019, David Huizenga).

The Raiders also recorded Richard Berry's "Have Love, Will Travel", a "'Louie Louie' rewrite", and "Louie, Go Home", an answer song penned by Lindsay and Revere after Berry declined their request to write a "Louie Louie" follow-up, as well as "Just Like Me", a "first cousin to 'Louie Louie'".

==== The Beach Boys (1964) ====
The Beach Boys released a cover of the song on the 1964 album Shut Down Volume 2 with lead vocals shared by Carl Wilson and Mike Love. Their version was unusual in that it opened with the R&B style of the Richard Berry original before transitioning into the rock/garage style of the Kingsmen, effectively paying tribute to the two earlier recordings. Other surf music versions included the Chan-Dells in 1963, the Pyramids, the Sentinals, and the Surfaris in 1964, the Trashmen, the Invictas, and Jan and Dean in 1965, the Challengers in 1966, the Ripp Tides in 1981, and the Shockwaves in 1988.

==== Otis Redding (1964) ====
Otis Redding's "spunky ... free-associating" version was released on his 1964 album Pain in My Heart. Dave Marsh called it "the best of the era" and noted that he "rearranged it to suit his style" by adding a full horn section and "garble[d] the lyrics so completely that it seems likely he made up the verses on the spot" as he "sang a story that made sense in his life" (including making Louie a female).

Other versions by R&B artists included Bobby Jay and the Hawks in 1964, Ike & Tina Turner, the Tams, and Nat & John in 1968, Wilbert Harrison in 1969, the Topics in 1970, and Barry White in 1981.

==== The Angels (1964) ====
With a version on their 1964 album A Halo to You, the Angels were the first girl group to cover "Louie Louie". Their "unlikely stab at [the] frat rock staple" was also one of the first to deliberately duplicate the Jack Ely early vocal re-entry mistake after the bridge. The Best of Louie Louie, Volume 2 included their rendition.

A Minnesota girl group, the Shaggs, released a version as a 1965 single (Concert 1-78-65), and Honey Ltd. covered the song on a 1968 album and as a single (LHI 1216); however, the distinction of first girl group participation on a version of "Louie Louie" would go to the Shalimars, an Olympia girl group who provided overdubbed backing vocals in 1960 for a recording by Little Bill (Englehardt) released as a single in 1961 (Topaz 1305).

Female solo artist versions in the 1960s included Italian singer Maddalena in 1967 as a single titled "Lui Lui", Tina Turner in 1968 (released in 1988 on Ike & Tina Turner's Greatest Hits, Volume 2), and Julie London on her 1969 album Yummy, Yummy, Yummy.

==== The Kinks (1964) ====
"Louie Louie"

Song by the Kinks

from the EP Kinksize Session
- Released: November 27, 1964
- Recorded: October 18, 1964
- Studio: Pye, London
- Genre: Rhythm and blues
- Length: 2:57
- Label: Pye NEP 24200
- Songwriter: Richard Berry
- Producer: Shel Talmy

The Kinks recorded "Louie Louie" on October 18, 1964. It was released in November 1964 in the UK on the Kinksize Session EP, reaching No. 1 on the Record Retailer EP chart. It was also released in 1965 on two US-only albums, Kinks-Size and Kinkdom, and on a French album, A Well Respected Man. Live 1960s versions were released on bootlegs The Kinks in Germany (1965), Kinky Paris (1965), Live in San Francisco (1969), Kriminal Kinks (1972), and The Kinks at the BBC (2012).

The Kinks version re-entered the charts in 2015, reaching No. 19 on the UK singles chart based on sales, downloads and streaming. The Kast Off Kinks continue to perform it live, occasionally joined by original Kinks members.

Sources vary on the impact of "Louie Louie" on the writing of "You Really Got Me" and "All Day and All of the Night". One writer called the two songs "sparse representations of a 'Louie Louie' mentality", while another succinctly called the former "a rewrite of the Kingsmen's 'Louie Louie'". A 1965 letter to London's Record Mirror opined, "Besides completely copying the Kingsmen's vocal and instrumental style, The Kinks rose to fame with two watery twists of this classic...." An opposing opinion was voiced by a different author who noted that the "You Really Got Me" riff is "unquestionably a guitar-based piece, [that] fundamentally differs from "Louie Louie" and other earlier riff pieces with which it sometimes is compared".

Dave Marsh asserted that the Kinks "blatantly based their best early hits" on the "Louie Louie" riff. Other sources stated that Davies wrote "You Really Got Me" while trying to work out the chords of "Louie Louie" at the suggestion of the group's manager, Larry Page. According to biographer Thomas M. Kitts, Davies confirmed that Page suggested that "he write a song like 'Louie Louie'", but denied any direct influence.

Biographer Johnny Rogan noted no "Louie Louie" influence, writing that Davies adapted an earlier piano riff to the jazz blues style of Mose Allison, and that he was further influenced by seeing Chuck Berry and Gerry Mulligan in Jazz on a Summer's Day, a 1958 film about the Newport Jazz Festival. Rogan also cited brother Dave Davies' distorted power chords as "the sonic contribution that transformed the composition" into a hit song.

Whether directly or indirectly, the Kingsmen version influenced the musical style of the early Kinks. They were huge fans of the Kingsmen's "Louie Louie" and Dave Davies remembered the song inspiring Ray's singing, saying in an interview:

We played that record over and over. And Ray copied a lot of his vocal style from that guy [Jack Ely]. I was always trying to get Ray to sing, because I thought he had a great voice, but he was very shy. Then we heard The Kingsmen and he had that lazy, throwaway, laid-back drawl in his voice, and it was magic.

Steven Van Zandt noted the same impact by Ely on Davies' "unusually conversational" vocal style. Alec Palao in the Love That Louie CD liner notes highlighted Davies' "supremely lecherous, almost drunken vocal" and suggested that "Davies drew from 'Louie' the urchin persona that populated so much of the Kinks' early work".

==== The Sandpipers (1966) ====
"Louie Louie"

Song by The Sandpipers

from the album Guantanamera
- Released: October 1966
- Recorded: 1966
- Studio: A&M, Hollywood
- Genre: Easy listening
- Length: 2:45 (single), 2:47 (album)
- Label: A&M Records 819
- Songwriter: Richard Berry
- Producer: Tommy LiPuma

After their No. 1 hit "Guantanamera", the Sandpipers, with producer Tommy LiPuma and arranger Nick DeCaro, "cleverly revived" the same soft rock, smooth ballad, Spanish language approach with a "quiet, yet majestic", "sweet interpretation" of "Louie Louie", reaching No. 30, No. 35, and No. 30 on the Billboard, Cashbox, and Record World charts, respectively (the highest charting U.S. version after the Kingsmen). The success of their "smoky version" heralded the entry of the ever adaptable "Louie Louie" into the MOR and easy listening categories and many followed: David McCallum and J.J. Jones (1967), Honey Ltd. (1968), Julie London (1969), Sounds Orchestral (1970), Line Renaud (1973), Dave Stewart and Barbara Gaskin (1991), and others released singles and albums featuring slower and mellower versions of what had previously been an up tempo pop and rock standard.

==== Travis Wammack (1966) ====
With the only instrumental version to make the charts, Travis Wammack reached No. 128 on the Bubbling Under Hot 100 in April 1966. An early guitar innovator and "precursor to guitar-hero shredding", his distinctive sound on "Louie Louie" was "liberally laced with fuzztone" created by playing through an overdriven drive-in movie speaker.

Released as a single (Atlantic 2322), the track was not included on Wammack's first album in 1972 or any thereafter. It appeared on a 1967 French release (Formidable Rhythm And Blues (Vol. 3)), but not again until two Wammack compilations, That Scratchy Guitar From Memphis (1987) and Scr-Scr-Scratchy! (1989). It was also included on two later various artists compilations, Love That Louie: The Louie Louie Files (2002) and Boom Boom A Go-Go! (2014).

Other notable 1960s instrumental versions included the Ventures, Ian Whitcomb, and Sandy Nelson in 1965, Ace Cannon and Pete Fountain in 1966, Floyd Cramer in 1967, and Willie Mitchell in 1969.

==== The Sonics (1966) ====
The Sonics released their "blistering makeover ... definitive punk arrangement" as a 1965 single (Etiquette ET-23) and on the 1966 album Boom. Later versions appeared on Sinderella (1980) and Live at Easy Street (2016).

Described as a major influence on punk and garage music worldwide, the group's characteristic hard-edged, fuzz-drenched sound and "abrasive, all-out approach" "took the Northwest garage sound to its most primitive extreme" and made their "Louie Louie" version ahead of its time. Their "Paleolithic arrangement" also made it more "fierce and threatening" by altering the traditional 1-4-5-4 chord pattern to the "darker, more sinister" 1-3b-4-3b.

==== Mongo Santamaria (1966) ====
Cuban percussionist and bandleader Mongo Santamaria's version, a "cousin of 'Watermelon Man'", returned "Louie Louie" to its Afro-Cuban roots, echoing Rene Touzet's "El Loco Cha Cha" with his conga- and trumpet-driven Latin jazz version. Originally released on the 1966 album Hey! Let's Party, it was also included on the 1983 compilation The Best of Louie Louie, Volume 2. Other early Latin-flavored versions were released by Pedrito Ramirez con los Yogis (Angelo 518, 1965), Pete Terrace (El Nuevo Pete Terrace, 1966), Eddie Cano (Brought Back Live from P.J.'s, 1967), Mario Allison (De Fiesta, 1967), and Rey Davila (On His Own, 1971).

Latin American jazz/rock innovator Carlos Santana compared Tito Puente's 1962 "Oye Como Va" to "Louie Louie" saying, "... how close the feel was to 'Louie Louie' and some Latin jazz tunes" and "... this is a song like 'Louie Louie' or 'Guantanamera'. This is a song that when you play it, people are going to get up and dance, and that's it."

==== Frank Zappa and the Mothers of Invention (1967) ====
"Louie Louie" occurred repeatedly as an "idée fixe" in the musical lexicon of Frank Zappa in the 1960s. He categorized the riff as one of several "Archetypal American Musical Icons ... [whose] presence in an arrangement puts a spin on any lyric in their vicinity" and used it initially "to make fun of the old-fashioned rock 'n' roll they had transcended". Although he characterized the Kingsmen version as a "mutilation" and an "Animal House joke", he had a higher opinion of Richard Berry, calling him "one of the most important figures in the West Coast rhythm-and-blues scene of the Fifties" and saying, "No one may not underestimate [sic] the impact of 'Louie Louie', the original Richard Berry version."

His original compositions "Plastic People" and "Ruthie-Ruthie" (from You Can't Do That on Stage Anymore, Vol. 1) were set to the melody of "Louie Louie" and included "Music by Richard Berry" credits. Zappa said that he fired guitarist Alice Stuart from the Mothers of Invention because she couldn't play "Louie Louie", although this comment was obviously intended as a joke.

At a 1967 concert at the Royal Albert Hall in London, Mothers of Invention keyboardist Don Preston climbed up to the venue's famous pipe organ, usually used for classical works, and played the signature riff (included on the 1969 album Uncle Meat). A live 1969 version appeared on the 2009 Meat Lovers #2 EP. Quick interpolations of "Louie Louie" also frequently turn up in other Zappa works.

==== Other 1960s versions ====
- Little Bill with the Adventurers and the Shalimars, on a 1961 single (Topaz T-1305).
- The Jordan Brothers, live in 1963.
- Terry Kath, on a 1963 demo with his first group, The Mystics.
- The Swamp Rats, on a 1964 single (St. Clair MF69). Also released on their 1979 album Disco Sucks.
- The Pyramids, a "danceable" version on their 1964 album The Pyramids Play The Original Penetration!
- The Standells, on a 1964 album The Standells in Person at P.J.s.
- Leon Russell, "pumping chords all the way through" as a session player on The Top-40 Song Book, a 1964 singalong album by arranger H. B. Barnum and producer David Axelrod.
- The Sentinals, on their 1964 album Vegas Go Go.
- Pat Metheny, in the 1960s with his first group, The Beat Bombs.
- John Fogerty, live in 1964 with the Golliwogs
- Allen Collins, with his first group, The Mods, in 1964
- The Bobby Fuller Four, recorded 1964, released on a French bootleg LP I Fought The Law in 1983 and on El Paso Rock: Early Recordings, Vol. 1 in 1996.
- Jan and Dean, live on their 1965 Command Performance album backed by the Fantastic Baggys; considered by some the "best track on the album".
- Steven Tyler, with his group The Strangeurs in 1965.
- A Millbrook School 1965 single featuring the Moongazers with "new singing sensation" Gino Wertz.
- Sandy Nelson, an instrumental version on his 1965 album Boss Beat; also included on the 2005 compilation Sandy Nelson's Big Sixties Beat Party.
- Marshall Crenshaw, with his first group in Detroit in the mid-1960s.
- The Invictas, on their 1965 album The Invictas À Go-Go; re-released in 1983.
- The Pink Finks (Australia), on a 1965 charting single (Mojo MO-001) with Ross Wilson singing "whatever sounded right to him".
- The Outcasts (New York), recorded 1960s, released in 1987 on The Battle Of The Bands Live!
- The Ventures, an instrumental version on their 1965 album The Ventures a Go-Go; also released on a 6-song Seeburg jukebox mini-LP.
- Ian Whitcomb, an instrumental piano version on a 1965 single (Tower 216).
- The Castaways, live in 1965 at the Cow Palace.
- Jim Morrison's first vocal performance on stage was "Louie Louie" in 1965 with Rick and the Ravens (with Ray Manzarek) at the Turkey Joint West in Santa Monica, and the newly formed Doors initially used it as their opening number.
- Todd Rundgren, in 1965 with his first group, Money. He described "Louie Louie" as "a song that changed my life".
- Don and the Goodtimes, backing Jim "Harpo" Valley on the 1966 album Harpo: Jim Valley with Don and the Goodtimes. The "extended raunch fest" that combined "elements of both the Raiders' and Kingsmen's arrangements" was also included on the various artists albums The Hitmakers (1966), Northwest Battle of the Bands, Volume 2 (2001), and Love That Louie (2002).
- Jack Ely and the Courtmen, on a 1966 single (Bang B-520) as "Louie Louie '66"; a version that "ploughs the same basic furrow as the original" with "a slightly harsher edge."
- The Troggs, on their 1966 UK album From Nowhere. Their 1966 hit single "Wild Thing" used the same chord progression as "fundamentally a 'Louie Louie' rewrite". James Marshall of Spin Magazine said of the Troggs, "All you need to make a great rock 'n' roll record are the chords to 'Louie Louie' and a bad attitude." A rerecorded version was released on the 2013 album This Is The Troggs.
- The Challengers, on their 1966 album California Kicks.
- Psychedelic versions by the West Coast Pop Art Experimental Band in 1966 on their debut album Volume One, Friar Tuck on his 1967 album Friar Tuck and His Psychedelic Guitar, Neighb'rhood Childr'n on their 1997 album (recorded 1967) Long Years in Space, and the Underground All-Stars on their 1968 album Extremely Heavy!.
- The Beau Brummels, on a 1966 album Beau Brummels '66 and a second version on the 1968 compilation The Best of the Beau Brummels, Vol. 44.
- Ace Cannon, an instrumental saxophone version on his 1966 album Sweet & Tough.
- Pete Fountain, an instrumental clarinet version on his 1966 album I've Got You Under My Skin; also included on the 1983 compilation The Best of Louie Louie, Volume 2.
- The Swingin' Medallions, on their 1966 album Double Shot (Of My Baby's Love).
- The Syndicate of Sound, a live version from 1966 released in 1991 by Cream Puff War magazine.
- Pink Floyd, in an earlier incarnation as The Pink Floyd Sound, regularly performed psychedelic versions with "wild improvised interludes" and "echo-laced discordant jams" in the mid-1960s. However, after an October 1966 Melody Maker concert review criticized their "dated R&B things" and said "Psychedelic versions of 'Louie Louie' won't come off", the song was dropped from future setlists.
- Eddie Cano and his Quintet, on his 1967 Brought Back Live from P.J.'s album.
- Floyd Cramer, an instrumental piano version on his 1967 album Here's What's Happening!
- David McCallum, on his 1967 It's Happening Now! album; described by Billboard as "exceptional as it builds slowly".
- The Robbs, on a 1968 EP W'R-IT In Milwaukee Radio!
- The Tams, on their 1968 album A Little More Soul.
- The Dick Crest Orchestra, on a 1968 album Would You Believe.
- Africa, in a medley with "Ode to Billie Joe" on their 1968 album Music From "Lil Brown"; described as "surprisingly ripe for lysergic interpretation."
- Ike and Tina Turner recorded "a sultry, little known rendition" in 1968 sung from "his avaricious girlfriend's point of view" with "the forlorn sailor owning a yacht". Their "soul romp" version was released on Ike and Tina Turner's Greatest Hits, Volume 2 in 1988 and also on The Best of Louie Louie, Volume Two in 1989.
- Honey Ltd., on their eponymous 1968 album and as a single (LHI 1216). A "slow-tempo, brass and funk rendition ... replete with cries of "Sock it to me, Louie!", it was produced by Jack Nitzsche and featured Ry Cooder on guitar. One writer characterized it as "slow, vague, and really drawn out" and group member Joan Sliwin said, "I never understood ... why 'Louie, Louie'?"
- Wilbert Harrison, on his 1969 album Let's Work Together and as a single (Juggernaut 70SUG405). Noted for "imparting his own personal stamp" and "unique vocal delivery" on his version.
- Willie Mitchell, an instrumental trumpet version on his 1969 album On Top; also released on a 6-song jukebox mini-LP.
- Jefferson Airplane and Grateful Dead (Joey Covington (vocals), Jerry Garcia, Jorma Kaukonen, Gary Duncan, Jack Casady, Mike Shrieve, others), live at the Family Dog at Great Highway, San Francisco on September 7, 1969.
- The Beatles, from the Get Back/Let It Be sessions in 1969; released on the 1995 Jamming With Heather bootleg CD.
- A "sexiest-of-all version by smokey-voiced diva Julie London" released as a 1969 single (Liberty 56085) and included on her final album Yummy, Yummy, Yummy, which also featured other contemporary rock songs.
- George Strait, in the late 1960s with his high school group, The Stoics.
- The Messengers, on their eponymous 1969 album and a 1970 single, both on the Rare Earth label.

=== 1970s ===
==== Iggy Pop (1972) ====
Iggy Pop (then known as Jim Osterberg) began performing "Louie Louie", "a song nearly as old and unkillable as Iggy himself", "with his own version of the dirty lyrics" in 1965 as a member of the Iguanas. Later with the Stooges and as a solo performer, he recorded multiple versions of the song, "turn[ing] the source material into something suitable for the modern age". As the "godfather of punk", he inspired a host of punk rock successors as "Louie Louie", with its "head banging chord sequence", became a "live staple for many punk-rock bands of the 1970s".

A 1964 instrumental demo cut with Osterberg/Pop on drums was released on Jumpin' with the Iguanas (1995) and a London rehearsal version from 1972 was released on Heavy Liquid (2005) and again on Born in a Trailer (2016). A 1973 live version was released on The Detroit Tapes (2009). Metallic KO (1976) featured a provocative version with impromptu obscene lyrics from the last performance of Iggy and the Stooges in 1974 at the Michigan Palace in Detroit where, according to Lester Bangs, "you can actually hear hurled beer bottles breaking on guitar strings". ("55 Minute Louie-Louie", released in 2017 by Shave on their High Alert digital album, commemorated the occasion.) Consequence called this version "a rock standard blown up from the inside out" and said, "The band's cover of 'Louie Louie' somehow both honors their rock 'n' roll forebears and spits on their legacy. In other words, it's punk at its best."

Pop later wrote a new version with political and satirical verses instead of obscenities that was released on American Caesar in 1993. One lyric in particular captured Pop's long term relationship with the song: "I think about the meaning of my life again, and I have to sing "Louie Louie" again." It was used during the opening credits of Michael Moore's Capitalism: A Love Story and as an ending song in Jim Jarmusch's Coffee and Cigarettes in which Pop took part as himself. The video game Just Dance also featured this version performed by a dancing Iggy Pop avatar.

Multiple live versions were released on Nuggets (recorded 1980, released 1999), Where The Faces Shine - Volume 2 (recorded 1982, released 2008), The Legendary Breaking Point Tour (recorded 1983, released 1993), Kiss My Blood (1991, VHS), Beside You (1993), and Roadkill Rising (1994).

As Iggy himself said, "If all else fails, do 'Louie', right? ... Play 'Louie Louie' and it will always get you outta anything."

==== Toots and the Maytals (1972) ====
"Louie Louie" journeyed to its lyrical Jamaican destination with a "slow skanking" reggae version "as soulful as it gets" by Toots and the Maytals. A shorter version was released as a 1972 single in Jamaica (Jaguar J.49) and the U.K. (Trojan TR-7865) with a longer version included on the 1973 Funky Kingston album, described by rock critic Lester Bangs writing in Stereo Review as "Perfection, the most exciting and diversified set of reggae tunes by a single artist yet released".

A BBC reviewer said, "The goofy garage anthem becomes both fiery sermon and dance-til-you-drop marathon. And, thanks to Toots' soulman's disregard for verbal meaning, the words are, if anything, even harder to discern than in the Kingsmen's version." Rolling Stone wrote, "And it passes the toughest test of any 'Louie Louie' remake — it rocks hard" while Hi-Fi News & Record Review cited its "incomprehensible majesty" and "crazy vigour" that made it "the best version ever". Another author, writing about the song's use in a scene in This Is England noted, "A black Jamaican band's cover of a black American song, made famous by a white American band, seems an appropriate signifier of the racial harmony that [director Shane] Meadows seeks to evoke ...."

The group performed the song frequently in concert and a live version appeared on the 1998 various artists album Reggae Live Sessions Volume 2. Toots Hibbert also performed it solo and with other acts until his death in 2020, most notably the Red Hot Chili Peppers and the Dave Matthews Band.

==== "Brother Louie" (1973) ====
Although musically not a true cover version, "Brother Louie", Errol Brown and Tony Wilson's song about an interracial romance, was "strongly inspired by the Kingsmen's classic" and described by Dave Marsh as "one of the truest heirs Richard Berry's 'Louie Louie' ever had" based on its theme of separated lovers and its minor key reprise of the chorus. The original release by Hot Chocolate reached No. 7 on the UK singles chart. A cover version by Stories was a No. 1 hit in the U.S. later the same year. In 1993, the Quireboys' version reached No. 31 in the UK.

==== Patti Smith (1975) ====
Multiple live versions by Patti Smith, the "punk poet laureate", were released in the mid-1970s on bootleg albums Let's Deodorize The Night, Teenage Perversity & Ships In The Night, In Heat, and Bicentenary Blues, usually as a medley in which Lou Reed's "Pale Blue Eyes" would "sacrilegiously segue" into "Louie Louie". A 1975 live version at The Bottom Line was described as "uptight" with her "raw voice barking out the chorus". Her version has also been described as tapping "directly into the primal, urchin-like spirit of rock's renaissance".

==== Jon the Postman (1977) ====
Described as "a committed and omnipresent figure on the punk and post-punk scene in Manchester", Jon the Postman became known for waiting until headline bands like the Buzzcocks, the Fall, and Warsaw (later Joy Division) had finished their sets (sometimes before they had finished), then mounting the stage in a drunken state, grabbing the microphone, and performing his own versions of "Louie Louie". The first occurrence was at a Buzzcocks concert at the Band on the Wall venue on May 2, 1977, which he described:

I think the Buzzcocks left the stage and the microphone was there and a little voice must have been calling, 'This is your moment, Jon.' I've no idea to this day why I sang 'Louie Louie,' the ultimate garage anthem from the 60s. And why I did it a cappella and changed all the lyrics apart from the actual chorus, I have no idea. I suppose it was my bid for immortality, one of those great bolts of inspiration.

For some reason it appeared to go down rather well. I suppose it was taking the punk ethos to the extreme – anyone can have a go. Before punk it was like you had to have a double degree in music. It was a liberation for someone like me who was totally unmusical but wanted to have a go.

A version of the song by The Fall with Jon on vocals appeared on the Live 1977 album which was described by Stewart Home as taking "the amateurism of the Kingsmen to its logical conclusion with grossly incompetent musicianship and a drummer who seems to be experiencing extreme difficulty simply keeping time". A version with his group Puerile was included on the 1978 album John the Postman's Puerile.

==== Motörhead (1978) ====
"Louie Louie"

Single by Motörhead

from the album Overkill (re-issue)
- B-side: "Tear Ya Down"
- Released: 25 August 1978
- Recorded: 1978
- Studio: Wessex, London
- Genre: Rock and roll; hard rock
- Length: 2:47
- Label: Bronze/EMI
- Songwriter: Richard Berry
- Producers: Neil Richmond; Motörhead

Motörhead singles chronology
"Motorhead" (1977)	"Louie Louie" (1978)	"Overkill" (1979)

Motörhead's "charming, laid-back rendition of an old rock chestnut" originated as a "cheap one-take demo" produced by Alvin Lee. With support from manager Doug Smith, the track was rerecorded and shopped to Bronze Records. Founder Gerry Bron disliked the "incendiary, almost sullen rendition", labeling it "about the worst record I'd ever heard". Nevertheless, it was released as the group's second single, "purely as a favour" to promoter Neil Warnock, to coincide with an upcoming tour.

A "rough-edged cover of the garage rock warhorse" with Clarke's guitar emulating the opening electric piano riff, it was paired with "Tear Ya Down" on a 7" vinyl single. Supported by a "back-breaking" touring schedule, the "high-octane" version reached No. 68 on the UK Singles Chart. The track also appeared on the CD re-issues of Overkill (1996) and The Best of Motörhead (2000).

Lead singer Lemmy Kilmister said,

I think we did a really good version of it – people tell me that it's one of the few times it's been recorded where the lyrics can be understood! Actually, I only got the first two verses and then the last verse was largely improvised.

On 25 October 1978, a pre-recording of the band playing the song was broadcast on the BBC show Top of the Pops, and was subsequently released on the 2005 album BBC Live & In-Session. Another live 1978 version was released on Lock Up Your Daughters (1990) and a 1978 alternate studio track appeared on Over the Top: The Rarities (2000). The 2005 "deluxe edition" of Overkill included the original version, the BBC version, and two alternate versions.

==== National Lampoon's Animal House (1978) ====
Bluto Blutarsky (John Belushi) performing "Louie Louie" in National Lampoon's Animal House forever cemented the song's status as a "frat rock" classic and a staple of toga parties. Belushi may have insisted on singing "Louie Louie" because he associated it with losing his virginity, but, according to director John Landis, it was included in the screenplay by soundtrack producer Kenny Vance long before Belushi was involved with the project because "... it would be the song the Deltas would sing".

In the film, the Deltas were clearly aping the Kingsmen version complete with slurred dirty lyrics, but the setting was 1962, a year before the Kingsmen recording. Although Richard Berry released his original version of the song in 1957, and the song had been popular with local bands in the Northwest following Rockin' Robin Roberts' 1961 single, the mythical Faber College was based on Dartmouth College in the Northeast U.S., so the use of "Louie Louie" was an anachronism.

The Kingsmen version was heard during the film along with a brief live rendition by Belushi with Tim Matheson, Peter Riegert, Tom Hulce, Stephen Furst, Bruce McGill, and James Widdoes. A separate version by Belushi played during the credits and was included on the soundtrack album. The Belushi version was also released as a single (MCA 3046) and reached No. 89, No. 91, and No. 91 on the Billboard, Cashbox, and Record World charts, respectively.

Another actor from the film, DeWayne Jessie as Otis Day of Otis Day and the Knights, included a version on the VHS release Otis My Man in 1987. The film's soundtrack producer Kenny Vance (formerly of Jay and the Americans) also released a version with his group The Planotones on the 2007 album Dancin' And Romancin'.

==== Bruce Springsteen (1978) ====
Bruce Springsteen has had a long association with "Louie Louie", playing it at multiple concerts and guest appearances, and commenting often on its significance.

From the 1979 No Nukes concert:

Rock is primarily about longing. All the great rock songs are about longing. "Like A Rolling Stone" is about longing; 'How does it feel to be without a home?' — "Louie, Louie"! You're yearning for –'Where's that big party that I know is out there, but I can't find it'.

From the 2018 soundtrack album for Springsteen on Broadway (spoken intro to "Tenth Avenue Freeze-Out"):

There is no love without one plus one equaling three. It's the essential equation of art. It's the essential equation of rock 'n' roll. It's the reason the universe will never be fully comprehensible. It's the reason "Louie Louie" will never be fully comprehensible. And it's the reason true rock 'n' roll, and true rock 'n' roll bands, will never die.

He has said that "Born in the U.S.A." was "the most misunderstood song since 'Louie Louie'", and one critic characterized The River as "Less Kierkegaard, lots more Kingsmen".

The first known recorded performance was on September 9, 1978, at the University of Notre Dame on the Darkness Tour, followed by other tour performances in 1978, 1981, 2009, and 2014. He also played the song in guest appearances with other groups in 1982 (at the Stone Pony with Cats on a Hot Surface) and 1983 (at The Headliner in Neptune, NJ with Midnight Thunder). Song "snippets" are frequently played within other songs: "High School Confidential", "Twist and Shout", "Glory Days", and "Pay Me My Money Down".

Multiple concert bootleg albums included a live "Louie Louie" version: Reggae 'N' Soul (1988), Notre Dame Game (1981), Rockin' Days (1983), Rock Through the Jungle (1983), Rock & Roll Is Here to Stay (1990), Clubs' Stories (1994), Songs for an Electric Mule (1994), Lost & Live (1995), The Boss Hits the Sixties (2009), Satisfaction (2014), Charlotte, NC 04/19/14 (2014), Who's Been Covered by the Boss (2014), Saginaw 1978 (2015), and High Hopes Tour 2014 (2018).

E Street Band drummer Max Weinberg played "Louie Louie" on his 2017 live Jukebox show, and guitarist Nils Lofgren credited some of his success to "I just happened to play 'Louie Louie' a little different than the other guys." Steven Van Zandt remembered it as the record that changed his life, saying, "That's where it all started."

More recently, Springsteen included the Kingsmen's version in a curated "frat rock" playlist on the 25th episode of his From My Home to Yours SiriusXM radio show in October 2023. In a 2024 interview on The Howard Stern Show, he described "Louie Louie" as "a great fucking song".

==== Other 1970s versions ====
- Sounds Orchestral, "by far the best of the numerous easy listening interpretations", in 1970 as a single (Janus 124) and on albums One More Time (US), Good Morning Starshine (UK), and Fantastic (France).
- Allman Brothers Band, live at the 1970 Tulane University homecoming dance.
- "John Lennon and Friends", at his 31st birthday party in 1971; released on the 1989 bootleg CD Let's Have A Party.
- MC5, included in early setlists and live in Helsinki in 1972; released on the Kick Copenhagen bootleg LP.
- Flash Cadillac & the Continental Kids as Herby and the Heartbeats in American Graffiti (1973 soundtrack album and 1984 home video release).
- Line Renaud, French singer, actress, and AIDS activist, as a 1973 single (MGM K14500); also included on the 2007 compilation 100 Chansons.
- New York Dolls, live in the early 1970s; their song "Private World" has been termed a "Louie Louie" update.
- Flamin' Groovies, on their 1971 album Teenage Head and included on their 1976 compilation Still Shakin'. Live versions appeared on Bucketful of Brains (1983), Slow Death Live (France, 1983) and Studio '70 (France, 1984).
- Heavy Cruiser, a Canadian group led by Neil Merryweather and Lynn Carey, on a 1972 single and eponymous album.
- Lyres, recorded mid-1970s, released on their 1987 album Live at Cantones.
- Goddo, a "Kinks-styled version" on their initial 1975 single (A&M 398) that reached No. 75 on the Canadian RPM chart.
- The Clash, on the 1977 Louie is a Punkrocker vinyl bootleg from the Sandinista! outtakes. One writer characterized it as "a raw and unusable jam".
- The Dictators, live at Popeye's Spinach Factory in 1977.
- Warsaw (later Joy Division), included in early setlists and live in Liverpool in 1977.
- The Fall, on the Live 1977 album.
- The Pop Group, in early 1977 setlists because it was "easy to play".
- Spider Stacy and the New Bastards (later with The Pogues), live at Whitefields School in 1977.
- The Studs, "punk-spoof supergroup" (Cabaret Voltaire members Stephen Mallinder, Richard H. Kirk, and Chris Watson, plus Ian Craig Marsh, Adi Newton, Glenn Gregory, Martyn Ware, and Haydn Boyes-Weston), live in Sheffield, UK in June 1977.
- Lou Reed, live at the Bottom Line May 21, 1978.
- Blondie, live on the European Tour (December 1979-January 1980); released on the 1979 Wet Lips, Shapely Hips bootleg album.
- R. Stevie Moore, on his 1976 album Stevie Moore Returns.

=== 1980s ===
==== Black Flag (1981) ====
"Louie Louie"
- The cover features Black Flag's singer Dez Cadena and some of his improvised lyrics to "Louie Louie".

Single by Black Flag
- B-side: "Damaged I"
- Released: 1981: 7-inch single; CD single
- Genre: Hardcore punk
- Length: 5:22
- Label: Posh Boy
- Songwriter: Richard Berry
- Producers: Spot; Black Flag

The Hermosa Beach, California, hardcore punk band Black Flag released a "raw", "rubbished", "brilliant, demented" version of "Louie Louie" as a single in 1981 on Posh Boy Records. It was the band's first release with Dez Cadena as singer, replacing Ron Reyes. Cadena would go on to sing on the Six Pack EP before switching to rhythm guitar and being replaced on vocals by Henry Rollins.

Bryan Carroll of AllMusic gave the single four out of five stars, saying, "Of the more than 1,500 commitments of Richard Berry's 'Louie Louie' to wax ... Black Flag's volatile take on the song is incomparable. No strangers to controversy themselves, the band pummel the song with their trademark pre-Henry Rollins era guitar sludge, while singer Dez Cadena spits out his nihilistic rewording of the most misunderstood lyrics in rock history."

You know the pain that's in my heart
It just shows I'm not very smart
Who needs love when you've got a gun?
Who needs love to have any fun?

The single also included an early version of "Damaged I", which would be re-recorded with Rollins for the band's debut album, Damaged, later that year. Demo versions of both tracks, recorded with Cadena, were included on the 1982 compilation album Everything Went Black.

The front cover art shows the main verse of the lyrics to "Louie Louie" over a photograph by Edward Colver featuring Black Flag's third singer Dez Cadena. Both tracks from the single were included on the 1983 compilation album The First Four Years, and "Louie Louie" was also included on 1987's Wasted...Again. A live version of "Louie Louie", recorded by the band's 1985 lineup, was released on Who's Got the 10½?, with Rollins improvising his own lyrics.

Continued touring, line-up changes, and occasional reunions resulted in multiple recorded live versions with various lead singers Keith Morris, Ron Reyes, Dez Cadena, Henry Rollins, and Mike Vallely.

==== Stanley Clarke and George Duke (1981) ====
A duo of "jazz rock fusioneers", bassist Stanley Clarke and keyboardist George Duke, included a "killer version" "funk cover" on The Clarke/Duke Project, a 1981 album of eight original compositions and one cover. The song's combination of narration and singing within a storytelling structure elicited a variety of reactions ranging from "appealing" and "imaginative adaptation" to "probably the funkiest version of 'Louie Louie' ever recorded". One Allmusic reviewer called it "a truly bizarre rendition" while another lamented that the Clarke/Duke version "criminally, never made it onto any of the various artists collections that showcased the legendary Richard Berry tune" (but it was included on The Best of Louie Louie, Volume 2).

A single was also released in Europe (cut to 3:38 from the album's 5:05 length). The album was nominated for a 1982 Grammy Award for Best R&B Performance by a Duo or Group with Vocals.

==== Barry White (1981) ====
Disco king Barry White created Richard Berry's "all-time favorite" version as he "reworked and revamped" the original to create a "Latin-tinged" rendition that "took the song from pure rock 'n' roll to pure moan 'n' groan". Not all reaction was positive, however, as CD Review dismissed it as "blasphemy" and "disco-fied".

White commented,

I'm gonna sing just like Richard Berry. I'm gonna do this song that this black guy wrote. Everybody thinks that these white guys recorded it, but a black guy did this.

Dave Marsh summarized Berry's reaction,

In White's arrangement, "Louie Louie" emerges as an up-tempo Latin groove, driven by timbales and congas and punctuated by brilliant trumpet riffs, while White supplements the chorus with the plaintive interpolation "Comin' home, Jamaaaica!" Richard Berry loved it because White's version finally brought to life his original vision of "all the timbales and congas going, and me singing 'Louie Louie'." "Barry White did it exactly the way I wanted to do it," Berry enthused, "I loved it."

In the Beware! liner notes, White wrote,

I would like to take this opportunity to emphasize and give an acknowledgement of credit. The song "Louie Louie" was originally written and created by a man who, I feel, was one of the true pioneers of my time. All my respect, highest admiration and love goes to Mr. Richard Berry.

The track was released on White's 1981 Beware! album, and also as 12" and a 7" single (shortened from 7:14 to 3:35). White also performed it on Soul Train on September 19, 1981, and on American Bandstand on August 8, 1981.

==== The Fat Boys (1988) ====
The Fat Boys with producers Latin Rascals brought "Louie Louie" up to date in 1988 with a hip-hop version which reached No. 89 on the Billboard Hot 100 chart and No. 46 on the UK Top 100. Their rap, with rewritten lyrics, "chronicled a pursuit of the song's real words". Dave Marsh in 1993 called their version "the last great 'Louie Louie' to date".

The Fat Boys version was released on the Coming Back Hard Again album on the Tin Pan Apple label, and also on a 12" single (5:42 and 3:50 edits) and a 7" single (3:50 edit). The 2009 compilation album Fat Boys On Rewind included it as well. Notable live performances in 1988 included Club MTV and the MTV Video Music Awards. The music video, directed by Scott Kalvert, was a parody of Animal House with food fights, dancing girls, and togas.

==== Other 1980s versions ====
- The Grateful Dead, multiple live versions in the 1980s with Brent Mydland on vocals.
- Pete Townshend, in a 1980 encore performance with The Clash at Brighton's Top Rank club.
- Joan Jett & the Blackhearts, on the 1992 CD reissue of the 1981 album I Love Rock 'n Roll; one of multiple versions that deliberately repeated the Jack Ely early vocal entry mistake. Joan Jett said of producer Neil Bogart's insistence that she record "Louie Louie", "This was a song that I did not want to do .... All that stuff at the beginning of the song is me trying to ensure that the song would suck. Didn't work. I thought it came out well."
- Half Japanese, on their 1981 album Our Solar System. Described by Robert Christgau as "lots to laugh at".
- Charlie Harper, on his 1981 album Stolen Property.
- Jim Capaldi, on his 1981 album Let the Thunder Cry.
- Magazine 60 (France), on their eponymous 1981 album.
- 39 Clocks (Germany), recorded as "Psychotic Louie Louie", on their 1982 album Subnarcotic.
- Moe Tucker, on her 1982 album Playin' Possum.
- Yo La Tengo, on an unreleased 1982 studio recording.
- Johnny Thunders, on his 1982 album In Cold Blood. A second version was released on the 2008 Who's Been Talking? compilation.
- Rory Gallagher, live at the Olympia Hall Paris in 1982; released on the 2022 album A Burning Fever.
- The Last, on the 1983 various artists album The Best of Louie Louie, also released on Painting Smiles on a Dead Man (France, 1983).
- Flo & Eddie, on the 1983 album The History of Flo & Eddie & the Turtles; also live in 1980s concerts as the Turtles.
- Australian Crawl, on their 1983 album Phalanx and as a single; another version was included on the 1986 album The Final Wave as "(The Last) Louie Louie".
- The Gun Club, live in 1984; released on the 2009 deluxe reissue of The Las Vegas Story.
- David Surkamp on a 1984 single (Butt Records MGLS003).
- The Fuzztones, live in 1984; released on the 2026 compilation album Just Once.
- Television Personalities, live in Germany in 1984; included on the 1993 reissue of their 1985 album Chocolate-Art.
- Royal Crescent Mob, live in 1985 in Louisville, KY; a 45-minute version as "Louisville Louisville".
- Howard Stern (vocals, piano) and Frank Zappa (guitar), live on The Howard Stern Show in 1985. The show was rebroadcast on Sirius Satellite Radio in 2006 and the track was included on the Under The Covers compilation album in 2019.
- The Bangles, in 1985 on MTV's The Cutting Edge with comment, "Does anybody know the words?"
- Kevin Dunn, on his 1985 album Tanzfeld. Described as "disjointed and slightly dissonant" and "wickedly satirical", his version was also released on the 2010 anthology No Great Lost: Songs, 1979–1985. Robert Christgau's album review characterized his rewritten "Louie Louie" lyrics as "inspirational verse".
- Bob Dylan and Tom Petty during rehearsals for Farm Aid 1985; released on the 2005 DVD So Many Directions Home Vol.2. Live versions by Tom Petty and the Heartbreakers were released on Live in Edinburgh 1982, Live at the Fillmore 1997, and other albums.
- The Kingsmen, in an audience performance at the end of Bud Clark's Inaugural Ball beginning his term as Mayor of Portland, Oregon in 1985.
- Girl Trouble, on the 1990 album Stomp And Shout And Work It On Out !!!! (recorded 1985).
- R.E.M., in multiple 1985 concert encores on the Pre-Construction and Reconstruction tours. A 1984 concert version was released on a 1987 Italian promotional double LP, The Pop Dream.
- The Sisters of Mercy, on the 1985 bootleg Brimstone & Treacle EP. Various live versions appeared on bootleg albums Possession, Half Moon Over Amsterdam, The Lights Shine Clear Through The Sodium Haze, A Fire In The Hull, At The Blind Parade, Cryptic Flowers, Live In Maastricht, Tune In... Turn Off... Burn Out..., and The Quality Of Mercy.
- The Cult, on the 1986 Lil' Devil EP as "Wild Thing/Louie Louie (Live)".
- Hüsker Dü, Meat Puppets, Minutemen, Saccharine Trust, and SWA, on the 1986 VHS release The Tour.
- Meat Loaf, in multiple concerts in Germany, Switzerland, and the UK on the 20/20 World Tour in 1987.
- Jimmy Buffett, live in 1987 at the Irvine Meadows Amphitheatre.
- ShowBiz Pizza debuted an animatronic version by Rock-afire Explosion in December 1987.
- The Purple Helmets (The Stranglers), on their 1988 album Ride Again and in multiple 1988 and 1989 live shows.
- Tiger Moon, three mixes on a 1988 12" single (Vision Records VR 1205).
- Paul Shaffer, on the 1989 album Coast to Coast.
- Deniz Tek, on his 1989 album Orphan Tracks.
- John Stamos with Scott Baio and cast members, on Full House S3E9 (November 24, 1989).
- Young & Restless, on their 1990 album Something to Get You Hyped.

=== 1990s ===
==== Coupe de Ville (1990) ====
Written by Mike Binder and directed by Joe Roth, Coupe de Ville featured an extended scene discussing possible interpretations of the "Louie Louie" lyrics and a closing credit montage of multiple versions.

Hearing the Kingsmen version on a car radio sparks an extended debate among the three Libner brothers (Patrick Dempsey, Arye Gross, Daniel Stern) about the lyrics and whether it is a "hump song", a "dance song", or a "sea chanty" with the eldest and most worldly brother arguing for the last interpretation. As the Los Angeles Times noted, "Joe Roth obviously knows the importance of the "Louie Louie" lyric controversy".

Multiple versions played during the closing credits: Richard Berry, the Rice University Marching Owl Band, the Sandpipers, Les Dantz and his Orchestra, the Kingsmen, and Young MC's "Louie Louie House Mix" (a remix of the Kingsmen version with samples from Richard Berry and the Rice University MOB). The movie trailer also used the Richard Berry and Kingsmen versions.

The soundtrack album, released by Cypress Records on vinyl, CD and cassette, included the Kingsmen and Young MC versions. A 12" EP (Cypress Records V-74500) was released with four tracks: "Louie Rap", "Louie Vocal Attack", "Louie Louie House Mix", and "Louie DePalma Mix" (all "featuring Maestro Fresh Wes" and "produced by Young MC").

A music video of "Louie Louie House Mix", credited to "Various Artists (featuring Young MC)", was concurrently released and included appearances by Robert Townsend ("It's a hump song!"), Kareem Abdul Jabbar ("It's a dance song!"), Martin Short, Young MC, and others.

The inclusion of the Kingsmen's "Louie Louie" is a bit of an anachronism in that the film takes place on a trip from Detroit to Florida during the summer of 1963. The initial release of the Kingsmen version on the regional Jerden label was in May 1963, but no significant national radio airplay and chart activity (or lyrics controversy) occurred until October and its national chart debut was not until early November.

==== The Three Amigos (1999) ====
The first release by the Three Amigos (Dylan Amlot, Milroy Nadarajah, and Marc Williams) was their multi-version cover of "Louie Louie". The 12" EP, titled Louie Louie, included "Original Mix", "Da Digglar Mix", "Wiseguys Remix", and "Touché's Bonus Beats". The CD tracks were different: "Louie Louie (Original Radio Mix)", "We Rock", and "Louie Louie Wiseguys Remix". Released in July 1999 as a CD single, "Original Mix" featured heavy sampling of the Kingsmen intro and chorus. It reached No. 15 on the UK Singles Chart (higher than the Kingsmen's No. 26 in 1964), leading to a February 7, 1999 appearance on Top of the Pops.

==== Other 1990s versions ====
- Johnny Winter, on the 1990 album A Lone Star Kind of Day.
- Guru Josh, on his 1990 acid house album Infinity that reached No. 41 on the UK chart. But "when critics spotted a cover of "Louie Louie" on his debut album, the game was definitely up".
- Ry Cooder, live in 1990 at a Village Music function with Richard Berry, Tim Drummond, Scott Mathews, Steve Douglas, and Johnnie Johnson.
- Eric Burdon, live in 1990 at a Ventura Beach concert; Burdon also included the Kingsmen's version in his curated list of 13 tracks as host of Rolling Stone's Guest D. J. program #105 on March 26, 1984.
- Dave Stewart and Barbara Gaskin, on their 1991 album Spin as a medley with "Cast Your Fate to the Wind".
- The Dave Matthews Band, in some of their early 1990s setlists. A version was included on the 2000 album The Best Of What's Around Vol. 1.
- John Stamos and David Coulier, on Full House S7E3 (September 28, 1993) with Dylan & Blake Tuomy-Wilhoit.
- The Queers, on a bonus 7" record included with the 1994 Shout at the Queers album.
- Neil Diamond, live at the 1995 NYU commencement ceremony.
- At the 1997 opening of the Experience Music Project, an encore version was performed by the Kingsmen joined by Paul Allen, the Presidents of the United States of America, and Steve Turner of Mudhoney. The other members of Mudhoney declined to participate, calling it "kind of lame".
- Warren Zevon, live with the Rock Bottom Remainders in Bangor, Maine in 1998. Horror author Stephen King sang lead, and music critic Joel Selvin performed an extended "scream solo".

=== 2000s ===
- The Guess Who, at their 2000 reunion concert in Winnipeg. The early group was known for their "most wondrous" "Louie Louie" medley imitating the Kingsmen, Kinks, Beach Boys, and Raiders. Burton Cummings regularly performs live versions at his concerts.
- Chuck E. Cheese featured a cartoon version by Munch's Make Believe Band in its pizza parlor shows in 2001.
- Al Copley, a "fresh arrangement" on his 2003 album Jump On It.
- In a 2003 Rolling Stone interview, Lindsey Buckingham declared, "God, I wish I had written 'Louie Louie'." In an earlier interview, he ranked it as one of his three favorite songs based on his love of "stupid, sloppy rock and roll". His live acoustic version was released on the Rare and Alive, Volume Two and What Love Is For bootleg albums.
- Steve Jordan, released an innovative, "blatantly personal" Tejano conjunto version on his 2005 album 25 Golden Hits.
- Mike Huckabee and Capitol Offense, live at HuckPAC 2008.
- Lisa Simpson and the Springfield Children's Band, on the 2005 episode of The Simpsons (Episode 367: "We're on the Road to D'ohwhere").
- Joe McPhee, Cato Salsa Experience, and The Thing, on the 2007 album Two Bands And A Legend; "a raggedly energetic cover that combines the best elements of The Kingsmen and The Sonics' versions" and turns the song "inside out".
- Eddie Angel and Johnny Rabb with The Trashmen, live at the Turf Club in St. Paul, MN on November 22, 2008.
- The Hives, live with The Sonics November 27, 2009 at Debaser Medis, Stockholm, Sweden.
- The Smashing Pumpkins, on their 2008 Live Smashing Pumpkins album series.
- Detroit7 (Japan), on two 2009 albums, Detroit7 and Black & White.
- James Williamson with Careless Hearts, on their eponymous 2009 album.

=== 2010s ===
- Mark Lindsay, live on the 2011 Happy Together: 25th Anniversary Tour.
- Baby It's You!, a 2011 Broadway jukebox musical, featured a production of "Louie Louie" by cast members as the Kingsmen, the Shirelles and Chuck Jackson (not included on original cast soundtrack album).
- Shellie Morris and Ross Wilson, on the 2013 Rockwiz Duets Volume IV album; reviewed as "corny", "mid-tempo tripe".
- Dick Dale, live at The Middle East in Cambridge in 2014.
- The Most (Sweden), on their 2015 album Invasion Completed; a "fabulously executed" cover.
- Billy Joel, live at the Moda Center in Portland on December 8, 2017.

=== 2020s ===
- The September 2021 issue of Rolling Stone magazine published a revised list of Rolling Stone's 500 Greatest Songs of All Time that ranked "Louie Louie" No. 156, down from No. 55 and No. 54 in the 2004 and 2010 rankings, respectively.
- My Morning Jacket with Karina Rykman, live at the 2024 Rose on the River festival in Chicago.
- Jack White, Patrick Keeler, Dominic Davis, and Bobby Emmett live at Boston's Roadrunner in February 2025.
- The Limiñanas (France), a "chic reimagining" on their 2025 album Faded.
- Dirty Three, a live "impromptu reading" at the Leeds Irish Centre in 2025.
- The Lemonheads, a "barely recognizable version" live at The Gov in Adelaide in 2025.
- Thee Headcoatees, a "bouyant" version on their 2026 album Ev'rybody's Gonna Be Happy.

=== Summary of charting versions ===
==== Singles ====
Year (Note: Ordered by chart entry date.)	Artist	Peak chart positions					Label	Album
Year	Artist	Billboard Hot 100	Cashbox Top 100	Record World	Canada (Note: CHUM chart 1963-1964. RPM chart 1965 and later.)	U. K.	Label	Album
1963	The Kingsmen	2 (Note: Entered chart November 9, 1963, and remained for 16 weeks; peaked in February 1964. Dave Marsh asserts that "Louie Louie" "far outsold" the No. 1 record "Dominique", but that "proper decorum" was a factor in keeping it from Billboard's top spot.)	1 (Note: Also reached #1 on the Cash Box R&B chart. The Billboard R&B chart was not published at this time.)	1 (Note: Also reached #1 on the Record World R&B chart.)	1	26 (Note: Entered chart January 30, 1964, for seven weeks. UK release on Pye International.) (Note: UK chart position was a composite ranking published by the Official UK Charts Company. Reached #17 in the NME rankings and #27 in Record Mirror per Marsh (p. 142). Also made UK charts in Melody Maker (#27), Disc (#22), Record Mirror (#26), and Pop Weekly (#21).)	Wand 143 (Note: Released on regional Jerden label in April 1963. Released nationally on Wand label in October 1963. Peak chart position reached in February 1964.)	The Kingsmen in Person (Note: Crowd noise overdubs added to simulate live version.)
1963	Paul Revere and the Raiders	103 (Note: Entered "Bubbling Under" chart November 9, 1963, for three weeks.)	—	—	—	—	Columbia 42814 (Note: Released on regional Sandē label in April 1963. Released nationally on Columbia label in October 1963.)	— (Note: Included on later reissue/compilation.) (Note: Live version included on Here They Come! (1965).)
1966	Travis Wammack	128 (Note: Entered ""Bubbling Under" chart April 9, 1966, for one week.)	—	—	—	—	Atlantic 2322	—
1966	The Kingsmen (Note: Same as 1963 version. Re-issued as "Louie Louie 64-65-66".)	97 (Note: Entered chart May 14, 1966, for two weeks.)	65	76	—	—	Wand 143	The Kingsmen in Person
1966	The Sandpipers	30 (Note: Entered chart October 22, 1966, for seven weeks.)	35	30	29 (Note: Entered chart October 17, 1966, for nine weeks.)	—	A&M 819	Guantanamera
1975	Goddo	—	—	—	75 (Note: Entered chart August 2, 1975, for six weeks.)	—	A&M 398	—
1978	Motörhead	—	—	—	—	68 (Note: Entered chart September 16, 1999, for two weeks.)	Bronze BRO 60	—
1978	John Belushi	89 (Note: Entered chart September 30, 1978, for four weeks.)	91	91	99 (Note: Entered chart October 21, 1978, for three weeks.)	—	MCA 40950	Animal House
1988	The Fat Boys	89 (Note: Entered chart October 15, 1988, for three weeks.)	—	—	—	46 (Note: Entered chart November 5, 1988, for four weeks.)	Tin Pan Apple 871010	Coming Back Hard Again
1999	The Three Amigos	—	—	—	—	15 (Note: Entered chart July 3, 1999, for six weeks.)	Inferno CDFERN 17	— (Note: Released as a CD single and on Louie Louie, a 12", four-song vinyl EP.)
2015	The Kinks	—	—	—	—	19 (Note: Ranking from UK singles chart based on sales, downloads, and streaming.) (Note: Entered chart February 5, 2015, for nine weeks.)	Sanctuary GBAJE6400025	Kinks (2011 reissue) (Note: Track available on multiple compilations and reissues.)
2021	Joske Harry's	—	—	—	—	100 (Note: Entered chart March 6, 2021, for one week.)	Radio Martiko RM002S	— (Note: Vinyl split reissue single.)

Table notes

==== EPs ====
Year	Artist	EP	Label	Peak chart positions	
Year	Artist	EP	Label	U.S.	U.K.
1964	The Kinks	Kinksize Session	Pye NEP 24200	— (Note: U.K. release only.)	1 (Note: Also reached #7 on the Record Mirror EP chart.)

Table notes

==== Albums ====
Year (Note: Ordered by chart entry date.)	Artist	Album (Note: US/UK charting albums with a "Louie Louie" version.)	Label	Peak chart positions	
Year	Artist	Album	Label	U.S.	U.K.
1964	The Kingsmen	The Kingsmen in Person (Note: Released December 1963; entered Billboard chart January 1964.) (Note: Crowd noise overdubs added to album version to simulate a live performance.)	Wand 657	20	—
1964	The Surfaris	Hit City 64	Decca 74487	120	—
1964	The Pyramids	The Original Penetration!	Best 16501	119	—
1964	The Beach Boys	Shut Down Volume 2	Capitol 2027	13	—
1964	Otis Redding	Pain in My Heart	Atco 161 (Note: Released in U.K. on Atlantic 587042.)	103	28
1964	The Wailers	Tall Cool One	Imperial 12262	127	—
1965	Jan & Dean	Command Performance (Note: Live version.)	Liberty 7403	33	—
1965	The Kinks	Kinks-Size	Reprise 6158	13	— (Note: U.S. release only.)
1965	Paul Revere & The Raiders	Here They Come!	Columbia 9107	71	—
1965	The Ventures	The Ventures a Go-Go	Dolton 8037	16	—
1965	The Kinks	Kinks Kinkdom	Reprise 6184	47	—
1966	Sandy Nelson	Boss Beat	Imperial 12298	126	—
1966	Mongo Santamaria	Hey! Let's Party	Columbia 9273	135	—
1966	The Beach Boys	Best of the Beach Boys	Capitol 2545	8	— (Note: Not included on #2 U.K. release.)
1966	The Swingin' Medallions	Double Shot (Of My Baby's Love)	Smash 67083	88	—
1966	The Troggs	From Nowhere	Fontana TL 5355	— (Note: Not included on #52 U.S. Wild Thing release.)	6
1966	The Sandpipers	Guantanamera	A&M 4117	13	—
1967	The Kinks	Sunny Afternoon	Marble Arch 716	— (Note: U.K. release only.)	9
1967	Floyd Cramer	Here's What's Happening!	RCA 3746	166	—
1967	Paul Revere & The Raiders	Greatest Hits	Columbia 9462	9	—
1969	The Mothers of Invention	Uncle Meat (Note: "Louie Louie" clone "Plastic People" included on Absolutely Free (1967, #41) and Mothermania (1969, #151).)	Bizarre 2024	43	—
1971	The Kinks	Golden Hour of The Kinks	Pye Golden Hour GH 501	—	21
1972	Paul Revere & The Raiders	All-Time Greatest Hits	Columbia 30768	143	—
1975	Toots and the Maytals	Funky Kingston	Island 9330	164	—
1978	John Belushi	Animal House	MCA 3046	71	—
1979	The Kingsmen	Quadrophenia (Note: Movie soundtrack album only. Omitted from the 1993 CD reissue, but included on the 2000 CD reissue.)	Polydor 6235 (Note: Released in U.K. on Polydor 2625 037.)	46	23
1981	Stanley Clarke and George Duke	The Clarke/Duke Project	Epic 36918	33	—
1988	The Fat Boys	Coming Back Hard Again	Tin Pan Alley 835809 (Note: Released in U.K. on Urban URBLP 13.)	33	98
1990	Young and Restless	Something To Get You Hyped	Pandisc 8809	104	—
1990	Guru Josh	Infinity (Note: Included on CD release only; not on vinyl or cassette.)	Deconstruction PL 74701	—	41
1993	Robert Plant	Wayne's World 2	Reprise 45485 (Note: Released in U.K. on Warner Brothers WB 45485.)	78	17
1997	The Kinks	The Very Best of The Kinks	Polygram TV 5375542	—	42
2000	Motörhead	The Best of Motörhead (Note: Alternate version.)	Metal-is MISDD002	—	52

Not listed:

- Motörhead — Overkill (UK #24); version included on the 1996 CD reissue but not on the original 1979 release.
- Joan Jett & the Blackhearts — I Love Rock 'n Roll (US #2, UK #25); version included on the 1992 CD reissue but not on the original 1981 release.

Table notes

=== "Louie Louie" compilations ===
- In 1983, Rhino Records released The Best of Louie, Louie: The Greatest Renditions of Rock's #1 All Time Song, "a format unknown to rock before", in conjunction with KFJC's "Maximum Louie Louie" event. The album featured a re-recorded Richard Berry version, influential versions by Rockin' Robin Roberts, the Sonics and the Kingsmen, Black Flag's version, and several other versions, some bizarre. These included an "outlandish" performance by the Rice University Marching Owl Band, an a cappella "Hallalouie Chorus", in which the song's title was sung to the melody of Handel's "Hallelujah Chorus", and a David Bowie imitation by Les Dantz and his Orchestra.
- The Best of Louie Louie, Volume 2 followed in 1989 with versions by Paul Revere and the Raiders, Mongo Santamaria, Pete Fountain, the Kinks, Ike and Tina Turner, the Shockwaves, and others.
- In 1994, Jerden Records released The Louie Louie Collection by the Best of the Northwest, a Pacific Northwest-oriented compilation featuring versions by the Kingsmen, Paul Revere and the Raiders, Don and the Goodtimes, Little Bill & the Adventurers, the Feelies, Ian Whitcomb, the University of Washington Husky Marching Band, and others. (The UW Husky Marching Band has been playing "Louie Louie" for over 40 years.)
- In 1997, The First Louie Louie Spanish Compilation was released by Louie Records featuring 11 versions by the Flaming Sideburns, the Navahodads, Luxury Liner, and others.
- In 2002, Ace Records released Love That Louie: The Louie Louie Files, a comprehensive overview of the origins, impact and legacy of "the cultural phenomenon known as 'Louie Louie'." Featuring detailed sleeve notes by Alec Palao, the CD contained 24 tracks divided into eight sections titled "The Original Louie", "Inspirational Louie", "Northwest Louie", "Louie As A Way Of Life", "Transatlantic Louie", "Louie: The Rewrite", "Louie: The Sequel" and "Louie Goes Home". The first CD reissue of Richard Berry's original version was included along with multiple historically important versions.
- Japan's Oldays Records released The Best of Louie Louie & More in 2023. The compilation featured the original Richard Berry version plus 24 covers from the 1960s including well-known versions by the Kingsmen, the Raiders, the Beach Boys, and the Sonics along with more obscure versions by the Pyramids, Friar Tuck, David McCallum, Ace Cannon, Mario Allison, the Challengers, the Invictas, and others.
- A 2024 compilation released by Dublin's Diet of Worms label, Hunger Is Violence, featured 14 of Ireland's "most singular experimental and avant-garde talents" with their "diverse reinterpretations" of "an ingrained piece of pop culture" "synonymous with rebellious energy". The liner notes by Kevin Barry highlighted "the song that invented viral" with its "single propulsive riff from deep in the vaults of time". Proceeds benefited the Ireland Palestine Solidarity Campaign.
- In 2025, Diet of Worms released a second "Louie Louie" compilation, The Sky Was A Mouth Again, with 22 "noise, free improvisation, post-punk, minimal electronics, and fractured folk" versions representing "a whole spectrum of personal, political and sonic explorations". Artists including Charles Hayward, Valentina Magaletti, Elias Rønnenfelt, Billy Childish, Lizzi Bougatsos, Junior Brother, Maarja Nuut, Richard Dawson, and White Magic participated in "reframing and reimagining it [Louie Louie] as a sprawling, unstable architecture of sound and resistance". Sales proceeds benefited Medical Aid for Palestinians and UNRWA.

=== Foreign language versions ===
Shortly after the Kingsmen's version charted in late 1963, the first international covers appeared. Since the original lyrics were notoriously difficult to discern, the translations were often inaccurate or adapted to a different storyline. Early foreign language versions included:

- Los Apson (Mexico), as "Ya No Lo Hagas", on a 1963 single (Peerless 1263) and a 1964 album Atrás De La Raya
- Joske Harry's and the King Creoles (Belgium), on a 1963 single (Arsa 107)
- Les Players (France), as "Si C'Etait Elle", on a 1964 single (Polydor 1879) and a 1964 EP (Polydor 27 129)
- Los Supersónicos (El Salvador), on a 1965 single (DCA 1082) and eponymous album
- Pedrito Ramirez con Los Yogis (US), on a 1965 single (Angelo 518)
- I Trappers (Italy), as "Lui Lui Non Ha", on a 1965 single (CGD 9606)
- Los Corbs (Spain), as "Loui Loui", on a 1966 EP (Marfer M.622)
- Les Zèniths (Canada), on a 1966 single (Première 825)
- Maddalena (Italy), as "Lui Lui" on a 1967 single (RCA Italiana 3413)
- Los Yetis (Colombia), on a 1968 album Olvidate

In 1966 the Sandpipers, a US group, released a slower tempo Spanish language version that reached No. 30 on the Billboard Hot 100 and was covered that same year in German by Die Rosy-Singers.

The 1983 compilation The Best of Louie, Louie featured a "goofy" Russian version by Red Square, and in 1997 an entire album of Spanish covers, The First Louie Louie Spanish Compilation, was released with versions by the Flaming Sideburns, the Navahodads, Los DelTonos, and eight others. Other Spanish versions were released by Los Hermanos Carrion (Mexico), as "Alu, Aluai" on a 1971 album Lagrimas de Cristal Que Manera de Perder, Los Elegantes (Spain), as "Luisa Se Va" on a 1985 album Paso A Paso, and Desperados (Spain), on a 1997 album Por Un Puñado De Temas.

In 1988, Michael Doucet released a "great vocal treatment" of "Louie Louie" in Cajun French on the Michael Doucet and Cajun Brew album. CD Review characterized his version as "oddly appropriate".

More recent non-English efforts included:

- Elektricni Orgazam (Serbia), as "Lui Lui", on a 1986 album Distorzija
- Irha (Italy), as "Lui Luisa", on a 1989 EP Beati I Primi (Attack Punk Records - APR 12)
- Eläkeläiset (Finland), as "Tilulilulei", on a 1994 album Joulumanteli
- The Dizzy Brains (Madagascar), as "Hiala Aho Zao", on a 2014 album Môla Kely
- Dynasis (Greece), as "Loui Loui" on a 2019 digital single

== Answer songs, sequels, and tributes ==
"Louie Louie" has spawned a number of answer songs, sequels, and tributes from the 1960s to the present:

- "Louie Go Home", 1964, Paul Revere & the Raiders (Columbia 4-43008); also recorded in 1964 by Davie Jones & The King Bees (David Bowie) as "Louie Louie Go Home" and by The Who in 1965 as "Lubie (Come Back Home)".
- "Love That Louie", 1964, Jack E. Lee & The Squires (RCA 54-8452); a "brazen attempt to approximate the idiosyncrasies of its predecessor."
- "Louie Come Home", 1965, The Epics (Zen 202)
- "Louie Come Back", 1965, The Legends (Shout! Northwest Killers Volume 2, Norton NW 907)
- "Louise Louise", 1966, H.B. & The Checkmates (Lavender R1936); "a raucous re-write."
- "Louie Go Home", 1966, The Campus Kingsmen (Impalla V 1481); different song from the Raiders version
- "Louie Louie's Comin' Back", 1967, The Pantels (Rich RR-120)
- "Louie Louie Louie", 1989, Henry Lee Summer (I've Got Everything, CBS ZK 45124)
- "Louie Louie Got Married", 1994, The Tentacles (K Records IPU XCIV)
- "Don Gallucci's Balls", 1994, The Mummies (Party at Steve's House, Pin-Up Records 94012); "a tribute to the Kingsmen member and Stooges producer".
- "Louie Louie (Where Did She Roam)", 1996, Thee Headcoats (SFTRI 335)
- "The Ballad of the Kingsmen", 2004, Todd Snider (East Nashville Skyline, Oh Boy Records OBR-031); "contemplates the meaning of the lyrics to 'Louie Louie'" and the tendency of the "religious right and the government ... to blame rock music for the moral decline of our youth."
- "Louie Louie Music", 2012, Armitage Shanks (Louie Louie Music EP, Little Teddy LiTe765)
- "I Love Louie Louie", 2014, The Rubinoos (45, Pynotic Productions 0045)
- "55 Minute Louie-Louie", 2017, Shave (High Alert, Rockstars Anonymous Music)
- "I Wanna Louie Louie (All Night Long)", 2018, Charles Albright (Everything Went Charles Albright, Sacramento Records 028)

== Parodies and rewrites ==
Due to the song's distinctive rhythm and simple structure, it has been used often as a basis for parodies and rewrites. Examples include:

- "Lilly Lilly" by Slim Jim. Three chord satire of the mumbled vocals of the Kingsmen version. Released on a 1964 single (Laurie 3226) produced and co-written by Ernie Maresca. The flip side, "Theme from Lilly Lilly", was released separately the same year by Maresca (Rust 5076).
- "Lewis Lewis" by the Rain Kings. Self-released on a 1966 EP with lyrics rewritten by group members Doug Dossett and Steve Lowry.
- "Plastic People" by Frank Zappa (with Richard Berry co-writer credit). Included on Absolutely Free in 1967 and on You Can't Do That on Stage Anymore, Vol. 1 in 1988.
- The Lumpen, a Black Panther Party musical group, rewrote "Louie Louie" as a protest song in 1967.
- "Pharaoh Pharaoh". Written in 1971 by Tony Sbrana. Released on multiple religious music albums (often with added verses).
- "Wal-ly Wal-ly" by Wally George. Political satire version released in 1984 on a 12" mini-LP (Rhino RNEP 612).
- "Ruthie-Ruthie" by Frank Zappa (with Richard Berry co-writer credit). Recorded in 1974 and released on You Can't Do That on Stage Anymore, Vol. 1 in 1988.
- "Bernie Bernie" by The Bleacher Bums (with Richard Berry writer credit). Ode to Bernie Kosar released by Leaky Records on cassette and vinyl single in 1987.
- "Christmas Christmas" by Mojo Nixon. Released on the Punk Rock Christmas compilation in 1995.
- "Santa Santa" by The '60s Invasion. Released on the 2012 album Incense & Chia Pets: A 60's Christmas Celebration.
- "Buddy Buddy". Ode to Oklahoma basketball star Buddy Hield written and recorded by Eric Kiper in 2015.
- "Jedi Jedi". Star Wars parody released online by Royish Good Looks in 2018.

== Lyrics controversy and investigations ==
As "Louie Louie" began to climb the national charts in late 1963, Jack Ely's "slurry snarl" and "mush-mouthed", "gloriously garbled", "infamously incomprehensible", "legendarily manic", "punk squawk" vocals gave rise to rumors about "dirty lyrics". The Kingsmen initially ignored the rumors, but soon "news networks were filing reports from New Orleans, Florida, Michigan, and elsewhere about an American public nearly hysterical over the possible dangers of this record". The song quickly became "something of a Rorschach test for dirty minds" who "thought they could detect obscene suggestions in the lyric".

In January 1964, Indiana governor Matthew E. Welsh, acting on a complaint letter from a pair of high school students, determined the lyrics to be pornographic because his "ears tingled" when he listened to the record. He referred the matter to the FCC and also requested that the Indiana Broadcasters Association advise their member stations to pull the record from their playlists. IBA President Reid Chapman dutifully sent telegrams to the state's radio stations recommending a ban. Several area newspapers responded by publishing the copyrighted lyrics, and Wand Records spokesman Stanley Kahn replied, "The problem is that the lead singer is just not clear. Anything dirty in 'Louie Louie' is something people hear in their own minds."

Marion County deputy prosecutor Leroy K. New commented,

The record is an abomination of out-of-tune guitars, an overbearing jungle rhythm and clanging cymbals. In fact, the record is an indictment of the taste of the American public. But I couldn't say one way or another whether the lyrics are obscene.

An initial FCC investigation found the song "unintelligible at any speed". The National Association of Broadcasters also investigated and deemed it "unintelligible to the average listener", but that "[t]he phonetic qualities of this recording are such that a listener possessing the 'phony' lyrics could imagine them to be genuine." Neither the FCC nor the NAB took any further action.

In response, Max Feirtag of publisher Limax Music offered $1,000 to "anyone finding anything suggestive in the lyrics", and Broadcasting magazine published the actual lyrics as provided by Limax. Scepter/Wand Records commented, "Not in anyone's wildest imagination are the lyrics as presented on the Wand recording suggestive, let alone obscene."

Producer Jerry Dennon thanked the governor, saying, "We really owe Governor Welsh a lot. The record already was going great, but since he's stepped in to give us a publicity boost, it's hard to keep up with orders." A letter to the editor of a local paper stated that "he [Welch] gave it more publicity in one week than it had gotten since the time of its release" and chastised the governor for spending time on "trivial, inconsequential matters". Billboard noted, "It also seems likely that some shrewd press agentry may also be playing an important role in this teapot tempest."

The following month an outraged parent wrote to Attorney General Robert F. Kennedy alleging that the lyrics of "Louie Louie" were obscene, saying, "The lyrics are so filthy that I can-not [sic] enclose them in this letter." The Federal Bureau of Investigation investigated the complaint, and looked into the various rumors of "real lyrics" that were circulating among teenagers. In June 1965, the FBI laboratory obtained a copy of the Kingsmen recording and, after 31 months of investigation, concluded that it could not be interpreted and therefore the Bureau could not find that the recording was obscene.

Over the course of the investigation, a "folk legend of modern times that has yet to be bettered for sheer inanity", the FBI interviewed Richard Berry, members of the Kingsmen, members of Paul Revere and the Raiders, and record company executives. The one person they never interviewed was the man who actually sang the words in question, Jack Ely, whose name apparently never came up because he was no longer with the Kingsmen.

By contrast, in 1964 the Ohio State University student newspaper The Lantern initiated an investigation in response to a growing campus controversy. Working with local radio station WCOL, a letter was sent to Wand Records requesting a copy of the lyrics. The paper printed the lyrics in full, resolving the issue, and resulting in booking the Kingsmen for the fall homecoming entertainment.

In a separate action, a record shop employee in El Paso, Texas, was charged in March 1964 with selling an obscene phonograph record after a complaint by a local pastor. Police claimed they could hear obscene words when the record was played at 331/3 rpm. The charges were dismissed on an evidence technicality.

In a 1964 interview, Lynn Easton of the Kingsmen said, "We took the words from the original version and recorded them faithfully", and group member Barry Curtis later added, "Richard Berry never wrote dirty lyrics ... you listen and you hear what you want to hear." Richard Berry told Esquire in 1988 that the Kingsmen had sung the song exactly as written and often deflected questions about the lyrics by saying, "If I told you the words, you wouldn't believe me anyway."

In a 1991 Dave Marsh interview, Governor Welsh "emphatically denied being a censor", claiming he never banned the record and only suggested that it not be played. Marsh disagreed, saying, "If a record isn't played at the suggestion of the state's chief executive, it has been banned."

A history of the song and its notoriety was published in 1993 by Dave Marsh, including an extensive recounting of the multiple lyrics investigations, but he was unable to obtain permission to publish the song's actual lyrics because the then current owner, Windswept Pacific, wanted people to "continue to fantasize what the words are". Marsh noted that the lyrics controversy "reflected the country's infantile sexuality" and "ensured the song's eternal perpetuation"; he also included multiple versions of the supposed "dirty lyrics". Other authors noted that the song "reap[ed] the benefits that accrue from being pursued by the guardians of public morals" and "[s]uch stupidity helped ensure 'Louie Louie' a long and prosperous life."

The lyrics controversy resurfaced briefly in 2005 when the superintendent of the school system in Benton Harbor, Michigan, refused to let a marching band play the song in a local parade; she later relented.

== Cultural impact ==
=== Book ===
Music critic Dave Marsh wrote a 245-page book about the song, Louie Louie: The History and Mythology of the World's Most Famous Rock 'n Roll Song, Including the Full Details of Its Torture and Persecution at the Hands of the Kingsmen, J.Edgar Hoover's F.B.I, and a Cast of Millions. Steven van Zandt commented that the book "captured an essential untold part of Rock history and was Dave at his brilliant best."

=== The Who ===
The Who were impacted in their early recording career by the riff/rhythm of "Louie Louie", owing to the song's influence on the Kinks. Shel Talmy, the producer of both bands, wanted the successful sounds of the Kinks' 1964 hits "You Really Got Me", "All Day and All of the Night", and "Till the End of the Day" to be copied by the Who. As a result, Pete Townshend penned "I Can't Explain", "a desperate copy of The Kinks", released in March 1965. The Who also covered the 1964 Lindsay-Revere sequel "Louie Go Home" in 1965 as "Lubie (Come Back Home)".

Although The Who never released their own "Louie Louie" cover, the Kingsmen's version was included on the 1979 Quadrophenia soundtrack album, and in 1980 the group performed a brief version in concert at the Los Angeles Sports Arena. Also in 1980, Townshend joined The Clash on stage for an encore performance that included "Louie Louie" (released on the 2001 Golden Bullets bootleg CD). In his 1993 book, Dave Marsh compared Keith Moon's drumming style to Lynn Easton of the Kingsmen.

=== Experimental music ===
"Louie Louie" has been used as the basis for experimental music compositions from the 1960s to the present day. Examples include:

- "Psyché Rock" (1967) and Futurama theme (1997)

French composers Michel Colombier and Pierre Henry, collaborating as Les Yper-Sound, produced a synthesizer and musique concrète work based on the "Louie Louie" riff titled "Psyché Rock". They subsequently worked with choreographer Maurice Béjart on a "Psyché Rock"-based score for the ballet Messe pour le temps présent. The full score with multiple mixes of "Psyché Rock" was released the same year on the album Métamorphose. The album was reissued in 1997 with additional remixes including one by Ken Abyss titled "Psyché Rock (Metal Time Machine Mix)" which, along with the original, "Christopher Tyng reworked into the theme song for the animated television comedy series Futurama."

- "Louie" (1994)

Phil Milstein, on the RRRecords America The Beautiful experimental album, assembled a "smog cloud" tribute collage of dozens of earlier versions that he titled simply "Louie".

- "The Louie Louie Variations" (1996)

An "intriguingly titled", "alternative classical" composition by Phillip Kent Bimstein performed by the Modern Mandolin Quartet on his Garland Hirschi's Cows album. Bimstein described the work as "a lively fantasy based on the archetypical I-IV-V chord progression ... [that] sends a small fragment on a deconstructive mission through a contemporary classical landscape."

- "The Four Louies" (2024)

Bill Orcutt, on his album The Four Louies, created a synthesis of "Louie Louie" and Steve Reich's Four Organs that "seamlessly melds these audio landmarks" and "provides a whiff of what made them revolutionary in the first place".

=== "Louie Louie" marathons ===
In the early 1980s, KPFK DJs Art Damage and Chuck Steak began hosting a weekly "Battle of the Louie Louie" contest featuring multiple renditions and listener voting. In 1981, KFJC DJ Jeff "Stretch" Riedle broadcast a full hour of various versions. Soon after, KALX in Berkeley responded and the two stations engaged in a "Louie Louie" marathon battle with each increasing the number of versions played. KFJC's Maximum Louie Louie Marathon topped the competition in August 1983 with 823 versions played over 63 hours, plus in studio performances by Richard Berry and Jack Ely.

During a change in format from adult-contemporary to all-oldies in 1997, WXMP in Peoria became "all Louie, all the time," playing nothing but covers of "Louie Louie" for six straight days. Other stations used the same idea to introduce format changes including WWSW (Pittsburgh), KROX (Dallas), WNOR (Norfolk), and WRQN (Toledo).

In 2011, KFJC celebrated International Louie Louie Day with a reprise of its 1983 event, featuring multiple "Louie Louie" versions, new music by Richard Berry and appearances by musicians, DJs, and celebrities with "Louie Louie" connections. In April 2015, Orme Radio broadcast the First Italian Louie Louie Marathon, playing 279 versions in 24 hours. In 2023, the city of Portland hosted a 24-hour live marathon to commemorate the 60th anniversary of the Kingsmen version.

=== Use in films ===
Various versions of "Louie Louie" have appeared in the films listed below.

Year	Title	Version(s)	On OST Album	Comments
1969	Zavolies (Ζαβολιές) (Note: Zavolies at IMDb)	Fotis Lazaridis Orchestra	n/a	Greece release
1972	Tijuana Blue	Kingsmen	n/a	
1973	American Graffiti	Flash Cadillac	No (Note: Not on the 1973 OST album or the 1979 More American Graffiti album.)	
1978	National Lampoon's Animal House	Kingsmen, Cast, John Belushi (Note: The Kingsmen version is heard during the film as is an impromptu version by John Belushi, Tim Matheson, Peter Riegert, Tom Hulce, Stephen Furst, Bruce McGill, and James Widdoes. Both versions were used in the trailer. A separately recorded version by John Belushi plays over the closing credits and was released as a single.)	Yes (Note: Only the John Belushi version is on the soundtrack album.)	Billboard #71
1979	Quadrophenia	Kingsmen	Yes (Note: Not on the original 1973 album. Included on the 1979 soundtrack LP and subsequent CD reissues.)	Billboard #46; UK #23 (Note: Chart rankings for 1979 soundtrack album. The original 1973 LP (without a "Louie Louie" version) reached #2 in the US and the UK.)
1983	Heart Like A Wheel	Jack Ely	No	
1983	Nightmares	Black Flag	Yes	
1984	Blood Simple	Toots and the Maytals	No	
1986	The Cult: Live In Milan (Note: The Cult: Live in Milan at IMDb)	The Cult	No	Italy release
1987	Survival Game (Note: Survival Game at IMDb)	Kingsmen	n/a	Also in trailer
1987	The Return of Sherlock Holmes	Cast (uncredited bar band)	n/a	TV movie
1988	The Naked Gun: From the Files of Police Squad!	Marching Owl Band (Note: In the film the USC Trojan Marching Band is shown but the Rice University MOB version is heard.)	Yes	
1988	Love at Stake	Kingsmen	No	
1989	Fright Night Part 2	Black Flag	No	
1990	Coupe de Ville	Kingsmen, Young MC (Note: The Kingsmen version occurs during the film. The Young MC "Louie Louie House Mix" (feat. Maestro Fresh Wes) plays during the credits and samples versions by Richard Berry, the Kingsmen, and the Rice University Marching Owl Band. Both versions are on the soundtrack album)	Yes	
1991	Reality 86'd	Black Flag	n/a	
1992	Jennifer 8	Kingsmen	No	
1992	Passed Away	Kingsmen	Yes	
1992	Dave	Cast (Kevin Kline)	No	
1993	Wayne's World 2	Robert Plant	Yes (Note: Also included on the Sixty Six to Timbuktu compilation album.)	Billboard #78; UK #17
1994	A Simple Twist of Fate	Cast (party singalong)	No	
1995	Mr. Holland's Opus	Cast (student band instrumental)	No	
1995	Man of the House	Kingsmen	n/a	
1996	Down Periscope	USS Stingray crew (Kelsey Grammer and others)	n/a	
1997	My Best Friend's Wedding	Kingsmen	No	
1998	ABC - The Alphabetic Tribe (Note: ABC – The Alphabetic Tribe at IMDb)	Kingsmen, Sandpipers	n/a	Swiss release
1998	Wild Things	Iggy Pop	No	
2001	Say It Isn't So	Kingsmen	No	
2002	La Bande du drugstore	Full Spirits	Yes	France release
2002	24 Hour Party People	John The Postman, Factory All Stars	No	UK release
2003	Old School	Black Flag	Yes	Kingsmen tribute (Note: A recreation of the 1965 The Kingsmen in Person album cover occurs when the main characters, dressed in cardigan sweaters, walk down the Janss Steps located on the UCLA campus.)
2003	Coffee and Cigarettes	Richard Berry, Iggy Pop	Yes	
2004	Friday Night Lights	Cast (marching band instrumental)	No	
2005	Guy X	Kingsmen	n/a	
2006	This Is England	Toots and the Maytals	Yes	UK release
2006	Bobby	Cast (Demi Moore) (Note: Imitation of 1969 Julie London version.)	Yes	
2009	Capitalism: A Love Story	Iggy Pop	n/a	
2010	Lemmy	Motörhead	n/a	UK release
2010	Knight and Day	Kingsmen (Note: Used as a cell phone ringtone by Roy Miller (Tom Cruise) character.)	No	
2010	Tournée	Nomads, Kingsmen	Yes (Note: Nomads version only.)	France release
2012	Best Possible Taste: The Kenny Everett Story (Note: Best Possible Taste: The Kenny Everett Story at IMDb)	Kingsmen	n/a	UK TV movie
2013	Il était une fois les Boys	King Melrose	Yes	Canada release
2013	Her Aim Is True	Sonics, Wailers	n/a	Sonics version also in trailer
2014	Desert Dancer	Jack Ely	No	UK release
2018	A Futile and Stupid Gesture	Kingsmen	n/a	
2019	Assholes: A Theory	Kingsmen (Note: Animal House clip)	n/a	Canada release
2020	The Way Back	Cast (pep band instrumental)	No	
2021	Penguin Bloom	Kingsmen	n/a	Australia release

The Kingsmen version was used in television commercials for Spaced Invaders (1990), but did not appear in the movie. (Note: YouTube: Spaced Invaders TV Spot 1990) The Kingsmen version also appeared on More American Graffiti (1975) and Good Morning Vietnam (1987) compilations, but was not used in either film.

Movie table notes

=== Use in video games ===
Video game use began with chiptune versions of "Louie Louie" in California Games. Since its introduction in 1987, California Games has been ported to more than a dozen gaming platforms, resulting in multiple unique "Louie Louie" versions based on different or improved programmable sound generator (PSG) chips. "Back 2 Back", composed by Hideki Naganuma for Sonic Rush, borrows the "Louie Louie" riff for its main section.

More recent rhythm action games featured individual artist versions including Donkey Konga (uncredited), Rocksmith (Joan Jett), Just Dance (Iggy Pop), and Rocksmith 2014 (Motörhead).

=== Use in ringtones and apps ===
"Louie Louie" has long been a popular downloadable ringtone, starting with early MIDI versions, then audio track excerpts, and then full audio tracks. Tom Cruise in Knight and Day (2010) used the Kingsmen version as a ringtone/movement reminder.

In 2015 Microsoft Messenger introduced the Zya Ditty app which allowed users to create short text-to-autotune music videos using a library of pre-licensed songs including "Louie Louie" and others.

=== Use in audio sampling ===
The earliest known sampling of "Louie Louie" (Kingsmen version) was "Flying Saucer" by Ed Solomon in 1964 (Diamond 160), one of many "break-in" records popular in the 1960s.

Beginning in 1988, multiple rap and hip-hop artists used audio samples of the keyboard intro and chorus of the Kingsmen version.

- 1988: Ultramagnetic MCs, "Travelling at the Speed of Thought" (12" single, initial release only); described by Melody Maker columnist Simon Reynolds as "a sublimely teasing edit ... [of] the sixties punk tearaway reincarnated in the eighties B-boy motormouth!"
- 1988: JVC Force, "Doin' Damage" (from album Doin' Damage); group member B-Luv stated, "It doesn't matter what color you are, 'Louie Louie' is a great song."
- 1988: Fat Boys, "Louie Louie" (from album Coming Back Hard Again; also released as a single)
- 1990: Young and Restless, "Louie Louie" (from album Something To Get You Hyped)
- 1990: Young MC and Maestro Fresh Wes, "Louie Louie" (from Coupe de Ville soundtrack album; samples Richard Berry, Kingsmen and other versions)
- 1999: The Three Amigos, "Louie Louie (Original Mix)" and "Wiseguys Remix" (12" EP, UK release)
- 1999: Mutha Funkin, "Say It Again" (12" single, UK release)
- 2004: T.O.K. feat. Shaggy, "Déja Vu" (from album Unknown Language)

=== Marching and concert band arrangements ===
In the 1980s, due to the widespread availability of sheet music arrangements, "Louie Louie" became a staple of concert, marching, and pep bands for middle schools, high schools, and colleges and universities in the U.S. To promote its sheet music offerings, the Hal Leonard Corporation released two albums with "Louie Louie" versions, Hal Leonard Marching Band 1987 and Hall Leonard Jazz Ensemble – Jazz! 1987-1988.

The earliest known high school band albums with a song version were the Evanston Township High School's Hi-Lights 1965 and the Franklin High School Choir, Orchestra, and Stage Band's 1966 Bel Cantos Concert. The first college band album with a version was the USC Trojan Marching Band's Let The Games Begin in 1984. Early orchestra and big band releases included Dick Crest (Would You Believe – The Dick Crest Orchestra) and Neil Chotem (Neil Chotem and his Orchestra), both in 1968.

Although not commercially released, an example of the song's influence was the 2000 performance by the Dover High School Band joined on saxophone by Bill Clinton (who played in a jazz trio named the Kingsmen at Hot Springs High School, and at whose 1964 graduation dance the actual Kingsmen performed).

=== Washington State song ===
In 1985, Ross Shafer, host and a writer-performer of the late-night comedy series Almost Live! on the Seattle TV station KING, spearheaded an effort to have "Louie Louie" replace "Washington, My Home" by Helen Davis as Washington's official state song. A "groundswell of public support" followed including support from the Kingsmen, Paul Revere and the Raiders, and the Wailers, an appearance by Shafer on Dick Clark's TV's Bloopers & Practical Jokes, and a Dubious Achievement Award from Esquire.

Picking up on this initially prankish effort, Whatcom County Councilman Craig Cole introduced Resolution No. 85-12 in March 1985 to endorse Louie Louie as the state song, citing the need for a "contemporary theme song that can be used to engender a sense of pride and community, and in the enhancement of tourism and economic development". His resolution also called for the creation of a new "Louie Louie County". While the state legislature did not designate Louie Louie as the state song, it did declare "Louie Louie Day" for April 12. A crowd of 3,000, estimated by press reports, convened at the state capitol in Olympia that day for speeches, singalongs, and performances by the Wailers, the Kingsmen, and Paul Revere & the Raiders. Two days later, a Seattle event commemorated the occasion with the premiere performance of a new, Washington-centric version of the song co-written by composer Berry. After a spirited debate, the legislature ultimately preserved "Washington, My Home" as the state song while also adopting Woody Guthrie's "Roll On, Columbia, Roll On" as the official folk song. "Louie Louie" remains the "unofficial state rock song".

Although the effort failed in the end, a cover of Berry's rewritten version was released in 1986 by Jr. Cadillac and included on the 1994 compilation The Louie Louie Collection. The "state rock song" was played following "Take Me Out to the Ball Game" during the seventh-inning stretch at all Seattle Mariners home games from 1990 (Note: "Louie Louie" was first played on June 2, 1990, a date also notable for the first no-hitter in Mariners' history (pitched by Randy Johnson).) through 2021, then reinstated in 2025. (Note: The original Kingsmen version plays during day games and a faster, "juiced up" remix plays during evening games.)

=== International Louie Louie Day ===
April 11 (Richard Berry's birthday) is celebrated as International Louie Louie Day and is listed by Chase's Calendar of Events, the National Special Events Registry, and other sources.

Holiday Today summarized:

International Louie Louie Day is significant because it celebrates the power of simplicity and accessibility in the arts. With just three chords and a straightforward rhythm, the song became a "rock standard" that almost any amateur musician could learn and perform, making it a foundational piece for the garage band movement of the 1960s. Its enduring presence in pop culture, including its famous inclusion in the film Animal House, has made it a symbol of youth, celebration, and the uninhibited spirit of rock and roll.

The day also highlights the importance of fair compensation for artists. Richard Berry famously sold the rights to the song ... missing out on millions in royalties until a legal battle in the late 1980s helped him regain a share of his earnings. By observing this day, the music community acknowledges both the creative genius of Berry and the persistence of the performers who turned his composition into a global phenomenon. It serves as a reminder that a truly great song can transcend its original genre and era to become a permanent part of the world's musical vocabulary.

Support for International Louie Louie Day and other "Louie Louie"–related observances is provided by the Louie Louie Advocacy and Music Appreciation Society (LLAMAS) and "Louie Louie" fans worldwide.

=== LouieFest ===
The City of Tacoma held a summer music and arts festival from 2003 to 2012 in July named LouieFest. The event began in 2003 as the "1000 Guitars Festival" and featured a group performance of "Louie Louie" open to anyone with a guitar. The event was renamed LouieFest in 2004. Members of the Wailers, Kingsmen, Raiders, Sonics and other groups with "Louie Louie" associations regularly made appearances. The grand finale each year was the "Celebration of 1000 Guitars" mass performance of "Louie Louie" on the main stage.

=== Louie Louie parades ===
The largest "Louie Louie" parade, organized by WMMR deejay John DeBella, was held in Philadelphia from 1985 to 1989 with proceeds going to leukemia victims. DeBella described it as "a parade for no reason ... and the no reason would be 'Louie Louie'." It regularly drew crowds in excess of 50,000, but was ultimately cancelled due to excessive rowdiness.

Peoria, Illinois claims the longest running "Louie Louie" event, holding an annual "Louie Louie" street party, parade, and festival every year since 1988.

=== Louie Louie sculpture ===
A sculpture titled Louie Louie, 2013 by Las Vegas-based artist Tim Bavington was displayed on the lobby wall of the Edith Green - Wendell Wyatt Federal Building in Portland, Oregon from 2013 to 2024. The work is constructed of 80 colored glass and acrylic panels representing the waveforms of the song using Bavington's concept of sculpting sound waves. In 2024, it was sold for $250,000 to a private party.

=== The Louie Awards ===
The Seattle Times bestows its Louie Awards upon "those who - through conscious act, rotten luck or slip of the tongue - stretch the limits of imagination or tolerance or taste in the Great Northwest."

=== Recognition and rankings ===
Summary of "Louie Louie" rankings and recognition in major publications and surveys.

Source	Poll/Survey	Year	Rank
Rock & Roll Hall of Fame	Hall of Fame Singles	2018	None
Rock & Roll Hall of Fame	Songs That Shaped Rock and Roll	1995	None
National Academy of Recording Arts and Sciences	Grammy Hall of Fame	1999	None
National Public Radio	The 300 Most Important American Records of the 20th Century	1999	None
Smash Hits, James E. Perone	The 100 Songs That Defined America	2016	None
The Wire Magazine	The 100 Most Important Records Ever Made	1992	None
Robert Dimery	1001 Songs You Must Hear Before You Die	2010	None
Mojo Magazine	Ultimate Jukebox: The 100 Singles You Must Own	2003	#1
The Ultimate Playlist, Robert Webb	The 100 Greatest Cover Versions	2012	#1
Paste Magazine	The 50 Best Garage Rock Songs of All Time	2014	#3
Rolling Stone Magazine	40 Songs That Changed The World	2007	#5
All Time Top 1000 Albums, Colin Larkin	The All-Time Top 100 Singles	2000	#6
Q Magazine	The Music That Changed the World	2004	#10
VH1	100 Greatest Songs of Rock and Roll	2000	#11
The Heart of Rock and Soul, Dave Marsh	The 1001 Greatest Singles Ever Made	1989	#11
Rolling Stone Magazine	The 100 Best Singles of the Last 25 Years	1989	#18
Los Angeles Magazine	LA's Top 100	2001	#19
Rock and Roll, Paul Williams	The 100 Best Singles	1993	#22
VH1	100 Greatest Dance Songs	2000	#27
NME Magazine	Top 100 Singles of All Time	1976	#43
Mojo Magazine	100 Greatest Singles of All Time	1997	#51
Rolling Stone Magazine	The 500 Greatest Songs of All Time	2004	#55
Rolling Stone Magazine	The 500 Greatest Songs of All Time	2010	#54
NEA and RIAA	Songs of the Century	1999	#57
Mojo Magazine	Big Bangs: 100 Records That Changed The World	2007	# 70
Pitchfork Magazine	The 200 Best Songs of the 1960s	2006	#154
Rolling Stone Magazine	The 500 Greatest Songs of All Time	2021	#156
NME Magazine	The 500 Greatest Songs of All Time	2014	#157
WCBS-FM	Top 1001 Songs of the Century	2005	#184

== Sources ==
- Blecha, Peter (2009). Sonic Boom! The History of Northwest Rock: From "Louie Louie" to Smells Like Teen Spirit. New York: Backbeat Books. ISBN 978-0-8793-0946-6.
- Doll, Christopher (2017). Hearing Harmony: Toward a Tonal Theory for the Rock Era. Ann Arbor: University of Michigan Press. ISBN 978-0472122882.
- Marsh, Dave (1993). Louie Louie: The History and Mythology of the World's Most Famous Rock 'n' Roll Song. New York City: Hyperion Books. ISBN 1-5628-2865-7.
- Marsh, Dave (1999). The Heart of Rock & Soul. Boston: Da Capo Press. ISBN 0-306-80901-X.
- Peterson, Dick (2005). Louie Louie Me Gotta Go Now. Sherwood, Oregon: Thalian Press. ISBN 1-4208-5610-3.
