= LouieFest =

American music festival

LouieFest is an American music festival featuring the prominent contributions to rock and roll by bands and performers, both emerging and established, from the Northwest region. Organized in 2003 by John 'Buck' Ormsby and Kent Morrill, members of The Wailers, LouieFest is an annual fundraising event for the Wailers Performing Arts Foundation which provides scholarships, instruments, music lessons and mentoring for youth music education.

The namesake of LouieFest is "Louie Louie", the most recorded rock song in history as documented by music historian Peter Blecha. According to Blecha's records and research, “Louie Louie” celebrated its 50-year mark in April, 2007 with 1,600 known recordings.

The legacy of this rock and roll song phenomenon is traced directly to The Wailers of Tacoma, Washington. Rockin’ Robin Roberts (1940-1967), the unnamed vocalist of The Wailers, collaborated with founding member and lead guitarist, Richard Dangel (1942-2002) to write an arrangement of the Richard Berry Jamaican sea shanty from the B-side of a 45-single he found in a record store for ten cents. ‘Rockin’ Roberts interjected one single phrase that is said to have changed rock music forever: “Let’s give it to ‘em right now.” This immortal idiom helped launch “Louie Louie” to the top of rock and roll fame, and subsequently inspired countless garage bands the world over.

The Wailers released “Louie Louie” in 1961 on their own label, Etiquette Records, history's first artist-owned label by a garage band. They achieved a huge regional hit with the single. The Kingsmen, and Paul Revere and the Raiders, are credited with later recordings of “Louie Louie” resulting in chart-topping, national exposure. Etiquette Records also pioneered the career of another notable Northwest garage band, The Sonics, who expanded the white rhythm and blues sound.

LouieFest celebrates the legacy of the three-chord sensation by closing every festival with the audience participating as an ensemble, playing “Louie Louie” in unison.
