= Kinksize Session =

EP by the Kinks
- Released: 27 November 1964
- Recorded: 23 September, 18 October and 16 November 1964 (Note: Hinman writes "Things Are Getting Better" was "possibly" recorded 16 November 1964, but may have been done on 18 October 1964.)
- Studio: Pye, London
- Length: 10:33
- Label: Pye
- Producer: Shel Talmy

The Kinks EP chronology
Kinksize Session (1964)	Kinksize Hits (1965)

Kinksize Session is the first EP released by the Kinks in the UK in 1964, just under two months after their debut LP, Kinks. The tracks were all exclusive to this release and it includes some original compositions.

== Recording ==
Despite the title, only three of the tracks were recorded in a single session on 18 October 1964 with "I Gotta Go Now" having already been recorded (believed to be at the same session as "All Day and All of the Night" on 23 September).

== Release ==
Kinksize Session was released in the UK, Australia, and New Zealand in 1964, reaching No. 1 on the Record Retailer UK EP chart. In the US, the tracks were included on the Kinks-Size album in 1965. "Louie Louie" was also included on Kinkdom in 1965 and on the UK compilation album Sunny Afternoon in 1967 but the other tracks remained unavailable elsewhere.

The EP was made available on CD in 1990 as part of The EP Collection boxed set. All four tracks were included as bonus tracks on the 2004 reissue of the Kinks' debut album. For Record Store Day 2015, the EP was re-released by BMG/Sanctuary with remastered tracks.

The follow-up EP, Kinksize Hits simply compiled the hit singles "You Really Got Me" and "All Day and All of the Night" along with their respective B-sides. Their next EP of original material would be 1965's Kwyet Kinks.

== Track listing ==
All tracks composed by Ray Davies; except where indicated.

=== Side one ===
1. "Louie Louie" (Richard Berry) – 2:57
2. "I Gotta Go Now" – 2:54

=== Side two ===
1. "I've Got That Feeling" – 2:45
2. "Things Are Getting Better" – 1:57

== Personnel ==
According to band researcher Doug Hinman:

The Kinks

- Ray Davies – lead vocals, piano ("Louie Louie" & "I've Got That Feeling"), (Note: In both cases, piano may have instead been played by session musician Perry Ford.) harmonica ("Things Are Getting Better")
- Dave Davies – backing vocals, electric guitar
- Pete Quaife – backing vocals, bass
- Mick Avory – drums

Additional musician and production

- Bob Auger – engineer
- Nicky Hopkins – piano ("Things Are Getting Better")
- Shel Talmy – producer

== Charts ==
Weekly chart performance
Chart (1964)	Peak position
UK Record Retailer EP chart	1
