= Tiger Moon (band) =

1980s disco/freestyle band

- Origin: Miami, U.S.
- Genres: Freestyle, disco
- Years active: 1987–1988
- Labels: Atlantic Records; Vision Records (US)
- Members: Mark Chambers; Felix DeKatt; David Geffinn

Tiger Moon was a disco/freestyle Miami-based group that is known for their 1987 song Something Tells Me. The song has appeared in several Gay, Miami and freestyle compilations. The track was sampled by Prince in his song Thieves In the Temple and by other artists (as RMB (Rolf Maier-Bode) in 'Reality' (1996)). Something Tells Me was used in the 1988 movie Frantic during a scene in which Harrison Ford's character, Richard Walker, enters The Blue Parrot looking for Dédé Martin.

== Discography ==
=== Singles ===
- Something Tells Me (Atlantic Records, 1987)
- Louie, Louie (Vision Records (US), 1988)

=== Compilation Appearances ===
- Gay Classics Vol. XII - Over And Out (SoBe Music, 1996) / Track : Something Tells Me
- Miami Beatz (OS Music, 1996) / Track : Something Tells Me
- Miami Dance Classics Volume 1 - "Jam On Me" (MIA Records, 1996) / Track : Something Tells Me
- Miami Freestyle (Vision Records (US), 1996) / Track : Something Tells Me
- Gay Classics Mega Mix Volume 1 (SoBe Music, 1997) / Track : Something Tells Me
- Ishology (Foxy - OXO - Company B) (RE Records, 2005) / Track : Something Tells Me
- Freestyle Highlights Vol. 1 (Soundland Grupo Musica, ?) / Track : Something Tells Me
