= The Ventures a Go-Go =

Studio album by The Ventures
- Released: September 1965
- Recorded: 1965
- Genre: Instrumental rock
- Length: 27:17
- Label: Dolton Records
- Producer: Joe Saraceno

The Ventures chronology
Knock Me Out! (1965)	The Ventures a Go-Go (1965)	The Ventures Christmas Album (1965)

Professional ratings
Review scores
Source	Rating
Record Mirror	3/5 stars

The Ventures a Go-Go is the seventeenth studio album by the band The Ventures; released in 1965 on Dolton Records BST 8037 (stereo) and BLP 2037 (monaural). It consists mostly of instrumental covers of popular tunes from the late 50s and early 60s, with a few original compositions. It was on the charts for 35 weeks and it peaked at #16 on the Billboard 200. This album was the fourth highest-charting album that The Ventures released.

== Track listing ==
=== Side one ===
1. "(I Can't Get No) Satisfaction" (Mick Jagger, Keith Richards) – 2:25
2. "Go-Go Slow" (Bob Bogle, Nokie Edwards, Mel Taylor, Don Wilson) – 2:10
3. "Louie Louie" (Richard Berry) – 2:10
4. "Night Stick" (Bogle, Edwards, Taylor, Wilson) –2:00
5. "La Bamba" (Traditional) – 2:25
6. "The "In" Crowd" (Billy Page) – 2:19

=== Side two ===
1. "Wooly Bully" (Domingo "Sam" Samudio) – 2:20
2. "A Go-Go Guitar" (Bogle, Edwards, Taylor, Wilson) – 2:15
3. "A Go-Go Dancer" (Bogle, Edwards, Taylor, Wilson) – 2:10
4. "The Swingin' Creeper" (Bogle, Edwards, Taylor, Wilson) – 2:37
5. "Whittier Blvd." (James Espinoza, Willie Garcia) – 2:20
6. "I Like It Like That" (Chris Kenner) – 2:20

== Personnel ==
=== Ventures ===
- Don Wilson – rhythm and lead guitar
- Nokie Edwards – lead guitar
- Bob Bogle – bass, lead guitar
- Mel Taylor – drums

=== Technical ===
- Joe Saraceno – producer
- Bruce Botnick – engineer
