= Kinks-Size =

1965 studio album by the Kinks

Studio album by the Kinks
- Released: March 1965 (Note: Doug Hinman writes the album "probably" came out on 24 March, but that it could also have been 31 March.)
- Recorded: August–December 1964
- Studios: Pye and IBC, London
- Genres: R&B; pop; rock
- Length: 23:02
- Label: Reprise
- Producer: Shel Talmy

The Kinks US chronology
You Really Got Me (1964)	Kinks-Size (1965)	Kinda Kinks (1965)

Singles from Kinks-Size
- 1. "Tired of Waiting for You" / "Come on Now" Released: c. 24 February 1965

Kinks-Size is a studio album by the English rock band the Kinks. Released in the United States and Canada in March 1965, it was their second album issued on Reprise Records. It peaked at number 13 on the Billboard album chart in the third week of June 1965, the same week the Kinks began their first US tour. It is the Kinks' fourth-highest-charting album on the Billboard album chart and the second-highest of their 1960s albums. (Note: The band's compilation The Kinks Greatest Hits! reached number nine in November 1966.) The album ranked number 78 on Billboard's year-end album chart for 1965.

== Overview ==
Reprise issued the album to capitalise on the nationwide publicity generated by the band's February 1965 appearance on the musical variety programme Hullabaloo. The album had no direct analogue outside of the US market, but instead collected songs from the UK EP Kinksize Session, two songs which had been left off of the US version of the band's debut LP ("Revenge" and "I'm a Lover Not a Fighter") and both the A- and B-sides of the "All Day and All of the Night" and "Tired of Waiting for You" singles. All of its songs were recorded at Pye Studios in London, between August and December 1964, though Dave Davies also overdubbed an electric guitar contribution to "Tired of Waiting for You" at IBC Studios in London.

== Reception ==
Professional ratings
Review scores
Source	Rating
AllMusic	3.5/5 stars
The New Rolling Stone Album Guide	3.5/5 stars

The album has been critiqued as a clear cash-grab by Reprise, but the actual songs included have been praised as "the best parts of the group's work in England", with Bruce Eder of AllMusic writing, "this record rocks, showing off the better sides of the group's R&B output and early, formative, Beatles-influenced experiments as well."

== Track listing ==
All songs written by Ray Davies unless otherwise noted.

Side one

1. "Tired of Waiting for You" – 2:30
2. "Louie Louie" (Richard Berry) – 2:57
3. "I've Got that Feeling" – 2:45
4. "Revenge" (Davies, Larry Page) – 1:28
5. "I Gotta Move" – 2:24

Side two

1. "Things are Getting Better" – 1:57
2. "I Gotta Go Now" – 2:54
3. "I'm a Lover Not a Fighter" (J.D. Miller) – 2:20
4. "Come on Now" – 1:45
5. "All Day and All of the Night" – 2:02

== Personnel ==
According to band researcher Doug Hinman:

The Kinks

- Ray Davies – lead vocals, rhythm guitar, harmonica; piano ("Louie Louie" and "I've Got That Feeling"); lead guitar ("Revenge")
- Dave Davies – backing vocals, lead guitar; lead vocals ("I'm a Lover Not a Fighter" and "Come on Now")
- Pete Quaife – backing vocals, bass guitar
- Mick Avory – drums; tambourine ("All Day and All of the Night")

Additional musicians

- Perry Ford – piano ("All Day and All of the Night")
- Bobby Graham – drums ("Tired of Waiting for You", "Revenge", "I'm a Lover Not a Fighter" and "All Day and All of the Night")
- Johnny B. Great – backing vocals ("All Day and All of the Night")
- Nicky Hopkins – piano ("Things Are Getting Better")
- Jimmy Page – twelve-string acoustic guitar ("I Gotta Move" and "I'm a Lover Not a Fighter")

Production

- Bob Auger – engineer
- Shel Talmy – producer

== Charts ==
Weekly chart performance
Chart (1965)	Peak position
US Billboard Top LPs	13
US Cash Box Top 100 Albums	10
US Record World 100 Top LPs	12

Year-end chart performance
Chart (1965)	Ranking
US Billboard	78
US Cash Box	51
