= The Three Amigos (band) =

UK musical group

The Three Amigos were a band in the late 1990s and early 2000s, most famous for their cover of "Louie Louie".

== Biography ==
The Three Amigos first single was their “Original Mix” cover of "Louie Louie". Released as a single in July 1999, it reached #15 in the UK Singles Chart. The band's logo on the single cover paid tribute to the logo of The Kingsmen, one of the first bands to cover "Louie Louie". The EP also featured remixes by the Wiseguys and Da Digglar.

The Three Amigos were made up of Dylan Amlot, Milroy Nadarajah, and Marc Williams.

Since the breakup of the band Dylan Amlot has continued to DJ, while Milroy Nadarajah turned to crime and, in 2004, was jailed for seven years for supplying cocaine to a London drug gang.

== Discography ==
=== EPs ===
- Louie Louie (Inferno, 1999)
- The Three Amigos Ride Again (Thumpin Vinyl, 2000)

=== Singles ===
List of singles, with selected chart positions
Title	Year	Peak chart positions	
Title	Year	UK	AUS
"Louie Louie"	1999	15	—
"25 Miles 2001"	2001	30	33

=== Remixes ===
- 1998 "I Like It Like That" (The Miami Allstars)
- 2002 "No Transmission" (LHB)
