= Eddie Cano =

American pianist and composer of Latin jazz (1927–1988)

Edward Cano (June 6, 1927 – January 30, 1988) was an Afro-Cuban jazz and Latin jazz pianist and composer.

== Early life ==
Cano was born in Los Angeles on June 6, 1927. His mother was Mexican-American, and his father, a bass guitarist, was Mexican. Cano's grandfather played with the Mexico City Symphony. Cano had classical piano lessons from the age of five. He also had training for the bass led by his grandfather and others, as well as trombone lessons. He began working in local bands, playing in nightclubs, in 1943.

== Later life and career ==
After two years in the Army from 1945, he played in a band led by Miguelito Valdés. He soon met vocalist Herb Jeffries, with whom he collaborated periodically for the next decade. Cano led his own bands from 1948, in addition to sideman work. Cano led albums in the 1950s and 1960s for several labels, including Atco, Reprise, and RCA. His Reprise recordings would prove the most successful, with his 1962 Eddie Cano at P.J's album reaching the top 40 in the US. He also used contemporary dance crazes to help promote himself.

Cano composed a large number of pieces. "While many of his peers concentrated on the peerless thrust of Latin rhythms, Cano hardly ignored this component but seemed equally intent on emphasizing the kind of complex, provocative harmonic and melodic structures associated with modern jazz."

Cano died in Los Angeles on Jan 30, 1988, apparently from a heart attack.

== Playing style ==
Cano was influenced by Noro Morales and Erroll Garner. Within a performance, he often changed "styles from Latin (with Latin rhythm section) to straight jazz (accompanied by drum kit)".
