= Rockin' Robin Roberts =

American singer (1940–1967)

"Rockin' Robin" Roberts
- Also known as: Robin Roberts
- Born: Lawrence Fewell Roberts II; November 23, 1940; New York City
- Died: December 22, 1967 (aged 27) San Mateo County, California, U.S.
- Genre: Rock and roll
- Occupation: Singer
- Years active: 1958–1962 occasionally until 1967
- Formerly of: The Wailers

Lawrence Fewell Roberts II (November 23, 1940 – December 22, 1967), known as Robin Roberts and in his music career as "Rockin' Robin" Roberts, was an American singer. He performed in the early 1960s with the Wailers, a rock and roll band based in Tacoma, Washington. His recordings include the earliest cover version of Richard Berry's "Louie Louie", recorded in 1960 and released the following year.

== Life ==
Born in New York City, Roberts moved to the Pacific Northwest as a child after his father died, settling with his mother in Tacoma. While at Mason Junior High School he started listening to rhythm and blues music and buying records in Tacoma's black district. At the Puyallup Fair in 1957 he stood up and began singing Little Richard songs unaccompanied, and was heard there by members of a local band, the Bluenotes. He joined the band, who already had a regular lead singer in "Little Bill" Engelhart, and performed with them as an occasional guest singer at weekend dances. One of the R&B songs he started performing with the group was "Louie Louie", the B-side of a 1957 single by Richard Berry; another was "Rockin' Robin" by Bobby Day, which gave him his new stage name.

In 1959, the Bluenotes – without Roberts, who was a full-time student at the time – recorded a ballad, "I Love An Angel", sung by Englehart. Credited to Little Bill and the Bluenotes, the single was issued by Dolton Records and rose to no. 66 on the Billboard Hot 100. Sidelined by the Bluenotes, Roberts left and, a few months later, joined rival local band The Wailers, whose instrumental "Tall Cool One" had also made the national charts. In 1960 he recorded "Louie Louie" with the Wailers, although for contractual reasons it was released under Roberts' own name on a new record label, Etiquette, established by the band. The record was released in early 1961 and became a local hit in the Seattle area, before being reissued and promoted by Imperial Records in Los Angeles; however, it failed to chart. The song finally became a hit for Portland, Oregon band The Kingsmen in 1963, largely using the arrangement devised by Roberts and the Wailers, including Roberts' ad-lib "Okay, let's give it to 'em right now!". Known for his dynamic onstage performances, Roberts continued to sing with the Wailers, and was one of the singers featured on their live album The Fabulous Wailers at the Castle, recorded in 1961.

In parallel with his singing career, Roberts was a successful student who attended the University of Washington and the University of Puget Sound, graduating in 1964. He then attended Oregon State University from 1965 to 1967, eventually achieving a master's degree in biochemistry and becoming an assistant professor. He also served in the United States Marine Corps Reserve from 1962 to 1967. In effect, he abandoned his musical career during this period, and the Wailers continued without him. However, in 1966 he returned to make his last recordings with the band on the single "You Don't Love Me". In July 1967, he moved to San Francisco and began work as a chemist for the Crown Cork and Seal Company.

== Death ==
Early in the morning of December 22, 1967, aged 27, Robin Roberts was killed in a head-on automobile accident after leaving a party. He was the passenger in a car traveling the wrong way on a divided freeway south of San Francisco and died at the scene.

Roberts is buried in Tacoma Cemetery located in Tacoma, Washington. In 1998, his original grave marker was replaced with a more elaborate memorial highlighting his "Louie Louie" connection.
