= Taking Punk to the Masses =

Taking Punk To The Masses: From Nowhere to Nevermind And Beyond
- First edition
- Author: Jacob McMurray
- Language: English
- Genre: Music History
- Publisher: Fantagraphics
- Publication date: May 10th, 2011
- Publication place: United States
- Pages: 248
- ISBN: 978-1606994337

Taking Punk To The Masses: From Nowhere To Nevermind And Beyond is a book by Jacob McMurray and editor Gary Groth. McMurray is the senior curator for the Museum of Pop Culture in Seattle. It was published in May 2011, in conjunction with the similarly titled Nirvana exhibit at the Museum of Pop Culture. The book includes a foreword by Nirvana's Krist Novoselic. The book includes stories mentioned from interviewees within the book, such as Mark Arm, Grant Hart, Calvin Johnson, Mark Mothersbaugh, Nirvana's Krist Novoselic, and nearly a hundred others who were a part of that musical scene.

== Release ==
The book was released on May 10, 2011, to coincide with the visual exhibit on display at the Museum of Pop Culture, in Seattle. Prior to the release, video excerpts of interviewees found transcribed within the book were released online for promotion of the book.

== Reception ==
Reception was well-received for the book. Josh Diamond of NPR stated that "Taking Punk to the Masses is a beautifully constructed gem. Even more peculiarly for a history lesson wedged between hard covers, it'll make you hear the music that has so spectacularly inflamed your speakers and headphones for three decades."
