= Haydn Boyes Weston =

Haydn Boyes-Weston was a session drummer and permanent member in bands from Sheffield, where he was born, including Human League, Cabaret Voltaire, 2.3 and Heaven 17. He committed suicide on 9 March 2014, aged 54.
