= Dick Crest =

Richard Crest (1930–2010) was a longtime member of the music department faculty at the College of San Mateo in San Mateo, California.

== Life ==
Crest attended San Mateo High School and San Jose State University. He taught at James Lick High School and was the first director of a high school band to play at a National Football League game.

After leading the college's concert band, Crest took over the leadership of the jazz band from Bud Young in the early 1960s, winning the majority of California jazz competitions. Crest invited a number of professional jazz musicians, including John Handy and Vince Guaraldi, to make appearances with the band, which performed in the college's little theatre. A 1968 album, Would You Believe?, was released by the Dick Crest Orchestra.

Crest performed special events and also led a professional band during the summer months at Rio Nido, California, on the Russian River, for evening concerts and dances in the village square during the 1950s and 1960s. He also directed the orchestra for the 1984 Democratic National Convention at the Moscone Center. Crest died in 2010 at the age of 80.
