= Young and Restless (hip-hop band) =

American hip hop duo

Young and Restless were an American hip hop duo from Miami whose members were Leonerist Lamar Johnson and Charles Trahan. They released a pair of albums in the late 1980s and early 1990s. Their two hit singles were a cover of "Poison Ivy" by The Coasters, and "B Girls". This duo received much airplay on the radio and had a video on MTV.

The album Something to Get You Hyped released in 1989, peaked at number 104 on the Billboard Top 200 chart during the summer of 1990. The duo released a second album in 1992, titled That Was Then, This Is Now!. Their only single from the album was "Yoke the Damn Thang!". The song did not made the charts and the group disbanded shortly after.

Leonerist Johnson (also known as The P.O.D) died on 8 September 2022.

== B girls ==
B Girls is one of two hit singles from hip-hop group Young & Restless. The song is about gold diggers who specifically target guys who possess items starting with the letter B. Specifically, these include "Broncos, Benzes, BMWs, bass, bangles, and "a pair of bars [chrome wire-spoke wheels] on a Cadillac Brougham". The chorus is sung to the melody of 99 Bottles of Beer.
