= The Invictas =

American garage rock band

Background information
- Origin: Rochester, New York, United States
- Genres: Garage rock; R&B; soul
- Years active: 1961-1970, 2004-present
- Labels: Sahara; Bengal
- Members: Herb Gross; Jim Kohler; Dave Hickey; Dave Profeta
- Past members: Bruce Hickey; Mark Blumenfeld

The Invictas (sometimes called Herb Gross & the Invictas) are an American garage rock band from Rochester, New York who were active in the 1960s, but re-formed in 2004 and have been intermittently active since. They were one of the most popular local bands in the Rochester scene during the 1960s, scoring a regional hit with "The Hump" in 1965.

== History ==
The band was formed by Herb Gross (a.k.a. Herb McGovern) in Rochester, New York in 1960.

The initial lineup consisted of the leader Gross on guitar and vocals, Bruce Hickey on guitar, and Dave Hickey on drums. In 1961, while Gross was attending the Rochester Institute of Technology, he expanded the band to include Jim Kohler on bass and Mark Blumenfeld on lead guitar. The band renamed themselves the Invictas. The name was inspired by the Buick car of the time known as the Invicta, meaning "invincible" in Latin. The Invictas, who used a black hearse with their band logo painted on the side to haul equipment and travel from gig to gig, became a regular fixture at Tiny's Bengal Inn, a local club.

The group attracted the attention of Steve Brodie's Sahara label.

A USA Today article says that the band recorded their debut single, "The Hump", in 1963, but this time frame is unlikely, because, according to Markesich's book, it was not released until June 1965, which places the period of recording between late 1964 and mid-1965. "The Hump" b/w "Long Tall Shorty" was released on Sahara. Just before going into the studio to record the single, the band had to bail their keyboard player out of jail. The song received airplay on the East Coast and was a hit in western New York, reaching a #1 position in Rochester, leading the band to claim that they "outsold the Beatles" locally.

In 1966, a year after the record's original release, "The Hump" became a huge hit, reaching #1 in Buffalo. The band's popularity exploded, and they opened for famous acts such as the Beach Boys, Jay and The Americans, the Shirelles, Gary Lewis and The Playboys, the Young Rascals, and Otis Redding. According to Gross, "Girls were chasing us. We could play pretty much wherever we wanted to play."

The Invictas recorded an album entitled The Invictas a Go-Go, which was produced by Dave Lucas and was hastily recorded during a weekend session in New York City in 1965. It consisted of several tunes written by Gross such as "Do It" and "The Hump," as well as covers of popular songs like "Hang On Sloopy", "Land of a Thousand Dances" and "Satisfaction." The group was not satisfied with the results, feeling that the project had been rushed. The band cut three more singles for Sahara Records and its sister label Bengal. In early 1966 the Invictas released "Do It" b/w "The Hook". They followed this with "I'm Alright" b/w "Stuff" later in the year. In 1967, they released "The Detroit Move", a blue-eyed soul number inspired by Detroit's Mitch Ryder, backed by "Shake a Tail Feather" on the B-side.

Facing the prospect of the Vietnam draft after graduation, Jim Kohler joined the Air Force and Dave Hickey followed suit. The band continued with modified lineups for several more years, but with the constant grind of touring finally taking its toll, the band broke up in the early 1970s.

Herb Gross started an advertising firm and has been active with it for many years. Jim Kohler became involved the printing business.

The Invictas had a brief and temporary reunion in the 1980. In 2004, Herb Gross and Dave Hickey were watching a blues band perform in Rochester and the singer invited them onto the stage. When Gross came up to sing, to his surprise, the crowd pleaded for him to sing "The Hump." Afterwards, he expressed to Hickey that the band should reunite. The band got back together with three of the four original lineup, Gross, Dave Hickey, and Jim Kohler, as well as also Dave Profeta, who is now the band's lead guitarist. Proefta also participated in their 1980 reunion. They have been active, playing various gigs and functions since, and have been profiled in USA Today and on NBC's The Today Show. They still travel in a hearse with their logo painted on the side.

Their collected work from the 1960s is included on the anthology Best of Herb Gross & the Invictas: Á Go Go, which includes their 1965 album Á Go Go along with singles and outtakes. Since re-uniting they have released an album of newly recorded material, Let's Party.

== Membership (circa 1966-1967) ==
=== 1960s ===
- Herb Gross (a.k.a. Herb McGovern) (lead vocals and guitar)
- Bruce Hickey (guitar)
- Jim Kohler (bass)
- Mark Blumenfeld (lead guitar)
- Dave Hickey (drums)

=== 2004 to present ===
- Herb Gross (lead vocals and guitar)
- Jim Kohler (bass)
- Dave Hickey (drums) (Retired, 2016)
- Dave Profeta (lead guitar, Vocals)
- Sammy Gruttadauria (Keys, Vocals)
- Jeff Hobbs (Drums)

== Discography ==
- "The Hump" b/w "Long Tall Shortie" (Sahara 107, June 1965)
- "Do It" b/w "The Hook" (Sahara 110, January 1966)
- "I'm Alright" b/w "Stuff" (Bengal 113, 1966)
- "The Detroit Move" b/w "Shake a Tail Feather" (Sahara 117, April 1967)
