= Kinks (album) =

1964 studio album by the Kinks

Studio album by the Kinks
- Released: 2 October 1964
- Recorded: 17 January, 13 July and 20–31 August 1964
- Studio: Pye and IBC, London
- Genre: R&B; rock and roll; pop; proto-punk
- Length: 32:54
- Label: Pye
- Producer: Shel Talmy

The Kinks chronology
Kinks (1964)	Kinda Kinks (1965)

The Kinks US chronology
You Really Got Me (1964)	Kinks-Size (1965)

You Really Got Me
- US release by Reprise Records

Singles from Kinks
- 1. "You Really Got Me" Released: 4 August 1964

Kinks is the debut studio album by the English rock band the Kinks. It was released on 2 October 1964 in the United Kingdom by Pye Records. The original United States release, issued by Reprise Records on 25 November 1964, omits three tracks and is instead titled You Really Got Me.

== Release ==
In France a 4-track EP with the songs from the album was released in 1965. It featured "Got Love If You Want It" (the title track), "I Took My Baby Home", "Cadillac" and "Beautiful Delilah". This EP was reissued in 2017 as part of Record Store Day 2017.

The album was re-released in 1998 in the UK on Castle Records with twelve bonus tracks. This reissue was itself reissued in 2004 on the Sanctuary label.

A deluxe edition was released on 28 March 2011.

== Reception ==
Professional ratings
Review scores
Source	Rating
AllMusic	3/5 stars
Uncut	3/5 stars

Consequence of Sound listed the album as a key example of proto-punk, observing "lean aggression" and a "jolting", "in-your-face" approach, and described their rendition of Chuck Berry's "Beautiful Delilah" as the first punk rock cover.

The AllMusic review by Richie Unterberger assessed the album as lacking in consistency, commenting: "As R&B cover artists, the Kinks weren't nearly as adept as the Stones and Yardbirds; Ray Davies' original tunes were, 'You Really Got Me' aside, perfunctory Mersey Beat-ish pastiches... [the] tunes that producer Shel Talmy penned for the group... were simply abominable."

Rock critic Mike Saunders of Rolling Stone had a more positive opinion of the Kinks' debut LP, described the album as one of their "successful rock and roll albums".

== Track listing ==
All tracks are written by Ray Davies unless otherwise noted.

Side one

1. "Beautiful Delilah" (Chuck Berry) – 2:07
2. "So Mystifying" – 2:58
3. "Just Can't Go to Sleep" – 1:58
4. "Long Tall Shorty" – (Don Covay, Herb Abramson) – 2:50
5. "I Took My Baby Home" – 1:48
6. "I'm a Lover Not a Fighter" (J. D. "Jay" Miller) – 2:03
7. "You Really Got Me" – 2:13

Side two

1. "Cadillac" (Ellas McDaniel) – 2:44
2. "Bald Headed Woman" (Shel Talmy) – 2:41
3. "Revenge" (Davies, Larry Page) – 1:29
4. "Too Much Monkey Business" (Berry) – 2:16
5. "I've Been Driving on Bald Mountain" (Talmy) – 2:01
6. "Stop Your Sobbing" – 2:06
7. "Got Love If You Want It" (James Moore) – 3:46

Note

- The original US release retained the same divisions between sides one and two but omitted three tracks: "I Took My Baby Home", "I'm a Lover Not a Fighter" and "Revenge".

== Personnel ==
According to band researcher Doug Hinman:

The Kinks

- Ray Davies – lead and backing vocals, rhythm guitar, harmonica; lead guitar ("I'm a Lover Not a Fighter")
- Dave Davies – backing vocals, electric guitar; lead vocal ("Beautiful Delilah", "Long Tall Shorty", "I'm a Lover Not a Fighter" and "I've Been Driving on Bald Mountain")
- Pete Quaife – backing vocals, bass guitar
- Mick Avory – drums (side two, except "Revenge"); tambourine, maracas

Additional musicians

- Rasa Didzpetris – backing vocals ("Stop Your Sobbing")
- Perry Ford – piano ("Bald Headed Woman" and "Stop Your Sobbing")
- Bobby Graham – drums (side one, "Revenge")
- Arthur Greenslade – piano ("You Really Got Me")
- Jon Lord – organ ("Bald Headed Woman")
- Jimmy Page – twelve-string acoustic guitar ("I'm a Lover Not a Fighter", "I've Been Driving on Bald Mountain" and possibly "Bald Headed Woman")
- Unknown session musician (Note: Hinman writes a guitarist from Edward Kassner's office played additional rhythm guitar on "You Really Got Me", "likely Harry, possibly Bob or Vic, surname unknown".) – rhythm guitar ("You Really Got Me")

Production

- Shel Talmy – producer
- Bob Auger – engineer

== Charts ==
Weekly chart performance
Chart (1964–65)	Peak position
UK Melody Maker Top Ten LPs	4
UK New Musical Express Best Selling LPs	5
UK Record Retailer LPs Chart	3
US Billboard Top LPs	29
US Cash Box Top 100 Albums	25
US Record World 100 Top LPs	20
West German Musikmarkt LP Hit Parade	7

Year-end chart performance
Chart (1965)	Ranking
US Billboard	98
US Cash Box	76
