= Barry Rudolph =

- Occupations: Mixing engineer; recording engineer; record producer; author; educator

Barry Rudolph is a recording engineer, mixing engineer, record producer, and technical writer best known for his work with Rod Stewart, Lynyrd Skynyrd, and Hall & Oates. Rudolph has been a contributing editor for Music Connection Magazine since 1987 and Mix Magazine since 1997. Rudolph is credited on more than 30 RIAA-certified gold and platinum records.

== Early life and career ==
Rudolph's interest in electronics started at a young age. While in sixth grade, he won a science fair competition for building a radio transmitter with parts from a war surplus store. In high school, he played the drums in a rock band and also designed and built a PA system for their use. He said that his interest in recording engineering developed, "I was interested in what made certain records sound better to me and why." He graduated with an Associate of Science degree from Santa Ana College in Santa Ana, California in 1969. In 1970, he graduated from California State University, Long Beach with a Bachelor of Science degree. Simultaneously, Rudolph worked for various Southern California aerospace and computer companies as a digital test technician.

His first job at a recording studio was as an assistant at United Audio in Santa Ana. In 1970, he moved to West Hollywood after accepting a position at Larrabee Sound Studios. He started cutting demo acetate discs and later assisted recording engineers during sessions. He was first engineer and mixer on his first #1 record. Al Wilson's album "Show and Tell" which received an RIAA gold certification in December 1973. Rudolph became a freelance engineer afterwards.

Rudolph began writing for Music Connection Magazine in 1987 and for Mix Magazine in 1997 and continues to contribute to both publications. He started teaching audio engineering in 2010 at Pinnacle College in Alhambra, California and then taught at Musicians Institute in Hollywood. He is the founder and owner of mixing facility Tones 4 $ Studios (pronounced "Tones For Dollars").

== Selected discography ==
Year	Album	Artist	Role
1973	Show and Tell	Al Wilson	Mixer
1975	Daryl Hall & John Oates	Daryl Hall & John Oates	Mixer
1975	Common Sense	John Prine	Engineer
1975	Best Of Everything	El Chicano	Engineer
1976	Footloose and Fancy Free	Rod Stewart	Engineer
1976	Are You Ready For The Country	Waylon Jennings	Engineer
1977	Street Survivors	Lynyrd Skynyrd	Engineer
1978	Levon Helm	Levon Helm	Engineer
1983	I'm Ready	Natalie Cole	Mixer
1984	Juice Newton's Greatest Hits (And More)	Juice Newton	Mixer
1988	Tales of the City	Rockmelons	Mixer
1988	The Ugly Americans in Australia	Wall Of Voodoo	Co-producer
1989	Merge	Arthur Baker & the Backbeat Disciples	Engineer
1992	Welcome to Howdywood	Boy Howdy	Engineer
1995	Enrique Iglesias	Enrique Iglesias	Engineer
1996	At Night I Pray	Wild Orchid	Engineer
1996	Songs of West Side Story	David Pack	Engineer
1998	Talk on Corners	The Corrs	Engineer
1999	Enrique	Enrique Iglesias	Engineer
1999	Screamin' for My Supper	Beth Hart	Engineer
2000	Sooner or Later	BBMak	Engineer
2001	Nuthin' Fancy/Second Helping	Lynyrd Skynyrd	Engineer
2001	All the Love	Oleta Adams	Mixer
2003	Go	Pat Benatar	Mixer
2006	Mile High Fan	Parthenon Huxley	Mixer
2008	When We Were the New Boys	Rod Stewart	Engineer
2012	Come to Me/Well Kept Secret/Take Heart	Juice Newton	Engineer
