= Touch and Go (Jerry Fuller song) =

Follow-up to Show And Tell

"Touch And Go"

Single by Al Wilson

from the album Show and Tell
- A-side: "Touch And Go"
- B-side: "Settle Me Down"
- Released: February 1974
- Genre: Soul, pop
- Length: 3:09
- Label: Rocky Road RR 30076
- Songwriter(s): Jerry Fuller
- Producer(s): Jerry Fuller

Al Wilson singles chronology
| "Show and Tell" (1973) | "Touch And Go" (1974) | "La La Peace Song" (1974) |

"Touch And Go" was a hit for Al Wilson in 1974. The song was written by Jerry Fuller. It was the follow-up to his hugely successful hit "Show And Tell".

== Background ==
=== Early versions ===
- The song made an early appearance in 1971 album by Cher, called Chér which would be retitled as Gypsies Tramps And Thieves. It was produced by Snuff Garrett and arranged by Al Capps and released on Kapp Records KS 3649
- New Zealand Maori singer John Rowles released it on single in 1972. It was backed with "More Than Just A Woman" and was produced and also arranged by Al Capps and released on the same Kapp label that Cher's album was released on.

== Al Wilson recording ==
In addition to composing the A side, Jerry Fuller produced it. Arrangements were handled by H. B. Barnum. The B side "Settle Me Down" was written by John Stevenson and produced by Marc Gordon.

For the week ending March 9, 1973 it entered the chart at no. 90. Wilson's previous hit "Show And Tell" was At its 21st week in the chart and had dropped from 26 to 39. For the week ending April 20, 1974, at its 4th week in the Top 50 Easy Listening chart, it had dropped one position from 43 to 44. That week on the Hot 100 chart, it also peaked at no 57 and spent a total of 9 weeks on the chart.

=== Chart performance ===
| Chart (1974) | Peak position |
|---|---|
| Canada RPM | 74 |
| US Billboard Easy Listening | 43 |
| US Billboard Hot 100 | 57 |
| US Billboard Hot Soul Singles | 23 |
