= Still on Your Side =

2000 single by BBMak

Single by BBMak

from the album Sooner or Later
- B-side: "Mary's Prayer"; "*"
- Released: 31 October 2000
- Length: 3:24 (single version); 3:30 (radio version)
- Label: Telstar
- Songwriters: Bridget Benenate; Bob Thiele Jr.; Dillon O'Brian; Christian Burns; Mark Barry; Stephen McNally
- Producer: Rob Cavallo

BBMak singles chronology
"Back Here" (2000)	"Still on Your Side" (2000)	"Ghost of You and Me" (2001)

Music video
- "Still on Your Side" on YouTube

"Still on Your Side" is a song by British pop rock band BBMak. It was released as the second single from their debut studio album, Sooner or Later (2000), in the United States on 31 October 2001 and in the band's native UK on 14 May 2001. Having previously achieved success in the American market first with their single "Back Here", "Still on Your Side" was BBMak's second top-10 hit in the UK, reaching number eight on the UK Singles Chart. In the US, the song charted at number 54 on the Billboard Hot 100, number 40 on the Billboard Adult Top 40 and number 14 on the Billboard Mainstream Top 40 chart.

== Background ==
"Still on Your Side" was written by Bridget Benenate, Bob Thiele Jr., and Dillon O'Brian, in addition to the three members of BBMak. Stephen McNally said "Still on Your Side" sounds like an anthem song, adding, "It's a song we wrote in Los Angeles and it's already been a big hit for us in America. You could imagine it being played at the World Cup with thousands of football fans singing along to it".

== Release ==
The single was originally planned to be released in the UK on 6 December 1999, but its commercial release was cancelled. A remixed version of the song was released in the US on 31 October 2000. This remix was then released in the UK on 14 May 2001 and reached number eight on the UK Singles Chart that same month.

== Reception ==
Billboard wrote the song is "a joyful all-out anthem" and "has a lyric to connect with the masses, the hooks to again reel in BBMak's younger fans, and the elegance and credible instrumentation to draw the attention of adults". Writing retrospectively about the song, Can't Stop the Pop said

Still on Your Side is a terrific follow-up that amply demonstrates BBMak's debut single was no fluke. The group was smartly pitched; they toured extensively with Britney Spears and *NSYNC, which neatly aligned them to the bubblegum pop demographic. However, they had a rockier sound and played their own instruments, which is precisely where that market was heading. Thus, Still on Your Side was so right for the time and perfectly brought together all of those elements. There was enough boyband appeal about BBMak to tap into that market, but their music was packaged in a way that could credibly appeal to mainstream and adult contemporary radio.

Additionally, the song is said to be "a welcome opportunity to cut loose with some triumphant ad-libs ('Don't you know that I'm still on your si-i-i-ide') and screeching electric guitar riffs".

== Music videos ==
The first music video was filmed in the US. It is set in a New York City street and opens with two Italian-American moving men trying to lift a wardrobe up to an apartment. The camera pans into one of the apartments where BBMak is performing the song. Throughout the video, each member of BBMak are able to save a woman from accidental injury. Christian pulls a woman out of the way of the falling wardrobe, Mark pulls a woman from the path of a stray baseball from a neighborhood kids' game, and Ste jumps in front of a woman before she can walk into incoming traffic. The video ends with people from the neighborhood singing along to the song.

The second music video is set in the UK, reflecting the band's roots. It was filmed in London and directed by Dani Jacobs. The video opens with a montage of shots of the House of Parliament, Regent Street, and a London Underground sign. A woman named Mia leaves a message on an answering machine, saying she wants to meet as soon as possible. The intended recipient of Mia's message is not shown, but each member of BBMak is shown receiving the message and believing it is meant for each of them, respectively. Each member gets in a Mini Cooper to drive to London and meet Mia in time. The three band members all reach their destination at the same time and have a laugh. This storyline is interspersed with footage of the band playing before a live audience inside a studio. The video had its world premiere on 20 November 2000 in an episode of MTV's Making the Video.

== Personnel ==
Personnel are adapted from the UK CD1 liner notes.

BBMak

- Christian Burns – writing
- Mark Barry – writing
- Stephen McNally – writing

Other personnel

- Bridget Benenate – writing
- Bob Thiele Jr. – writing
- Dillon O'Brian – writing
- Rob Cavallo – production
- Jon Lind – associate production
- Chris Lord-Alge – mixing

== Charts ==
=== Weekly charts ===
Chart (2001)	Peak position
Europe (Eurochart Hot 100)	40
Ireland (IRMA)	30
Scotland Singles (OCC)	4
UK Singles (OCC)	8
US Billboard Hot 100	54
US Adult Pop Airplay (Billboard)	40
US Pop Airplay (Billboard)	14

=== Year-end charts ===
Chart (2001)	Position
US Mainstream Top 40 (Billboard)	80

== Release history ==
Region	Date	Format(s)	Label(s)	Ref.
United States	31 October 2000	Contemporary hit radio	Hollywood	
United Kingdom	14 May 2001	CD	Telstar	
