= 2002 Teen Choice Awards =

Entertainment awards ceremony

- Date: August 4, 2002 (ceremony); August 19, 2002 (air date)
- Location: Universal Amphitheatre, Universal City, California
- Hosted by: None

Television/radio coverage
- Network: Fox

The 2002 Teen Choice Awards ceremony was held on August 4, 2002, at the Universal Amphitheatre, Universal City, California, and later aired on August 19, 2002, on Fox. The awards celebrate the year's achievements in music, film, television, sports, fashion, comedy, video games, and the Internet, and were voted on by viewers living in the US, aged 13 and over through various social media sites. The event had no designated host but Britney Spears and Verne Troyer introduced the show with Nelly, Jennifer Love Hewitt and BBMak as performers. Reese Witherspoon received the Extraordinary Achievement Award.

== Performers ==
- Nelly – "Hot in Herre"
- Jennifer Love Hewitt – "BareNaked"
- BBMak – "Out of My Heart (Into Your Head)"

== Presenters ==
- Justin Timberlake – introduced Nelly
- Britney Spears and Verne Troyer – presented Choice Comedy TV Show
- Seann William Scott and Dwayne "The Rock" Johnson – presented Choice Summer Movie
- Mark McGrath and Pamela Anderson – presented Choice Female Athlete and Choice Male Athlete
- Frankie Muniz and Michelle Trachtenberg – presented Choice Love Song
- Jessica Alba and Lil' Romeo – presented Choice Drama TV Actor
- Jack Black and Rose McGowan – presented Choice Movie Hissy Fit
- Jack Osbourne, Kelly Osbourne, and Tom Green – presented Choice TV Actor: Comedy
- Eve and Nick Carter – presented Choice Breakout Movie Actress
- Alyson Hannigan and NSYNC – presented Choice Movie: Comedy
- The Real World: Chicago cast – introduced Jennifer Love Hewitt
- Wilmer Valderrama and Seth Green – presented Choice TV Reality
- Randy Jackson, Paula Abdul, and Simon Cowell – introduced Kelly Clarkson, Nikki McKibbin, Justin Guarini, and Tamyra Gray and presented Choice Music Breakout Artist
- Tony Hawk, Tara Lipinski, and Apolo Anton Ohno – introduced surfboard presenters and presented Choice TV Breakout Show
- Tom Welling, Kristen Kreuk, Michael Rosenbaum, Allison Mack, and Sam Jones III – presented Choice Female Artist
- Selma Blair – presented Extraordinary Achievement Award
- Carmen Electra and Joshua Jackson – presented Choice Male Artist and introduced No Secrets, Sudden Rush, and Triple Image
- Erika Christensen, Eva Amurri, and Susan Sarandon – presented Choice Movie Actor: Comedy
- Nick Cannon and Tweet – presented Choice Single
- Jamie Kennedy and Jaime Pressly – presented Choice Drama TV Show
- Alexis Bledel – introduced BBMak
- Tim Allen – presented Choice Movie Actress: Comedy
- Jamie Lynn Spears and Britney Spears – presented Choice Movie Actor: Drama/Action Adventure

== Winners and nominees ==
Winners are listed first and highlighted in bold text.

=== Movies ===
Choice Movie: Drama/Action Adventure	Choice Movie Actor: Drama/Action Adventure
**Spider-Man**; A Beautiful Mind; Black Hawk Down; Harry Potter and the Sorcerer's Stone; The Lord of the Rings: The Fellowship of the Ring; Men in Black II; Moulin Rouge!; Star Wars: Episode II – Attack of the Clones	**Tobey Maguire – Spider-Man**; Ben Affleck – Changing Lanes; Hayden Christensen – Star Wars: Episode II – Attack of the Clones; Josh Hartnett – Black Hawk Down; Dwayne "The Rock" Johnson – The Scorpion King; Brad Pitt – Ocean's Eleven; Will Smith – Men in Black II; Elijah Wood – The Lord of the Rings: The Fellowship of the Ring
Choice Movie Actress: Drama/Action Adventure	Choice Movie: Comedy
**Natalie Portman – Star Wars: Episode II – Attack of the Clones**; Drew Barrymore – Riding in Cars with Boys; Sandra Bullock – Divine Secrets of the Ya-Ya Sisterhood; Kirsten Dunst – Spider-Man; Jennifer Lopez – Enough; Mandy Moore – A Walk to Remember; Britney Spears – Crossroads; Liv Tyler – The Lord of the Rings: The Fellowship of the Ring	**American Pie 2**; Not Another Teen Movie; Orange County; The Princess Diaries; Scooby-Doo; Shallow Hal; The Sweetest Thing; Zoolander
Choice Movie Actor: Comedy	Choice Movie Actress: Comedy
**Chris Tucker – Rush Hour 2**; Jason Biggs – American Pie 2; Jack Black – Shallow Hal; Matthew Lillard – Scooby-Doo; Freddie Prinze Jr. – Scooby-Doo; Adam Sandler – Mr. Deeds; Ben Stiller – Zoolander; Barry Watson – Sorority Boys	**Sarah Michelle Gellar – Scooby-Doo**; Selma Blair – The Sweetest Thing; Cameron Diaz – The Sweetest Thing; Anne Hathaway – The Princess Diaries; Gwyneth Paltrow – Shallow Hal; Christina Ricci – Pumpkin; Winona Ryder – Mr. Deeds; Reese Witherspoon – The Importance of Being Earnest
Choice Movie Your Parents Didn't Want You to See	Choice Movie Sleazebag
**American Pie 2**; 40 Days and 40 Nights; Black Hawk Down; Blade II; Collateral Damage; Not Another Teen Movie; Resident Evil; The Sweetest Thing	**Seann William Scott – American Pie 2**; Lara Flynn Boyle – Men in Black II; Willem Dafoe – Spider-Man; Will Ferrell – Zoolander; Andy García – Ocean's Eleven; Christopher Lee – The Lord of the Rings: The Fellowship of the Ring & Star Wars: Episode II – Attack of the Clones; Ian McDiarmid – Star Wars: Episode II – Attack of the Clones; Mike Myers – Austin Powers in Goldmember
Choice Breakout Movie Actor	Choice Breakout Movie Actress
**Daniel Radcliffe – Harry Potter and the Sorcerer's Stone**; Orlando Bloom – The Lord of the Rings: The Fellowship of the Ring; Steven Brand – The Scorpion King; Hayden Christensen – Star Wars: Episode II – Attack of the Clones; Colin Farrell – Minority Report; Luke Goss – Blade II; Johnny Knoxville – Men in Black II; Shaobo Qin – Ocean's Eleven	**Mandy Moore – A Walk to Remember**; Beyoncé Knowles – Austin Powers in Goldmember; Samantha Mumba – The Time Machine; Franka Potente – The Bourne Identity; Jaime Pressly – Not Another Teen Movie; Britney Spears – Crossroads; Leonor Varela – Blade II; Emma Watson – Harry Potter and the Sorcerer's Stone
Choice Movie Chemistry	Choice Movie Liplock
**Shane West & Mandy Moore – A Walk to Remember**; Jackie Chan & Chris Tucker – Rush Hour 2; Hayden Christensen & Natalie Portman – Star Wars: Episode II – Attack of the Clones; Josh Hartnett & Shannyn Sossamon – 40 Days and 40 Nights; Tobey Maguire & Kirsten Dunst – Spider-Man; Frankie Muniz & Amanda Bynes – Big Fat Liar; Freddie Prinze Jr. & Sarah Michelle Gellar – Scooby-Doo; Britney Spears & Anson Mount – Crossroads	**Tobey Maguire & Kirsten Dunst – Spider-Man**; Jason Biggs & Alyson Hannigan – American Pie 2; Hayden Christensen & Natalie Portman – Star Wars: Episode II – Attack of the Clones; Matt Damon & Franka Potente – The Bourne Identity; Dwayne "The Rock" Johnson & Kelly Hu – The Scorpion King; Viggo Mortensen & Liv Tyler – The Lord of the Rings: The Fellowship of the Ring; Adam Sandler & Winona Ryder – Mr. Deeds; Shane West & Mandy Moore – A Walk to Remember
Choice Movie Hissy Fit	Choice Summer Movie
**Ben Stiller – Zoolander**; Cate Blanchett – The Lord of the Rings: The Fellowship of the Ring; Hayden Christensen – Star Wars: Episode II – Attack of the Clones; Willem Dafoe – Spider-Man; Cameron Diaz – The Sweetest Thing; Josh Hartnett – 40 Days and 40 Nights; Samantha Morton – Minority Report; Will Smith – Men in Black II	**Mr. Deeds**; Austin Powers in Goldmember; The Bourne Identity; Men in Black II; Minority Report; Reign of Fire; Scooby-Doo; Star Wars: Episode II – Attack of the Clones

=== Television ===
Choice Drama TV Show	Choice Drama TV Actor
**7th Heaven**; Alias; Buffy the Vampire Slayer; Dark Angel; Dawson's Creek; Felicity; Gilmore Girls; Smallville	**Barry Watson – 7th Heaven**; Scott Foley – Felicity; Joshua Jackson – Dawson's Creek; James Marsters – Buffy the Vampire Slayer; Jared Padalecki – Gilmore Girls; Scott Speedman – Felicity; Tom Welling – Smallville; Shane West – Once and Again
Choice Drama TV Actress	Choice Comedy TV Show
**Sarah Michelle Gellar – Buffy the Vampire Slayer**; Jessica Alba – Dark Angel; Lauren Ambrose – Six Feet Under; Alexis Bledel – Gilmore Girls; Jessica Biel – 7th Heaven; Jennifer Garner – Alias; Katie Holmes – Dawson's Creek; Keri Russell – Felicity	**Friends**; The Bernie Mac Show; Greg the Bunny; Malcolm in the Middle; Scrubs; The Simpsons; That '70s Show; Will & Grace
Choice Comedy TV Actor	Choice Comedy TV Actress
**Matt LeBlanc – Friends**; Zach Braff – Scrubs; Topher Grace – That '70s Show; Seth Green – Greg the Bunny; Sean Hayes – Will & Grace; Ashton Kutcher – That '70s Show; Bernie Mac – The Bernie Mac Show; Frankie Muniz – Malcolm in the Middle	**Jennifer Aniston – Friends**; Courteney Cox – Friends; Jane Kaczmarek – Malcolm in the Middle; Lisa Kudrow – Friends; Mila Kunis – That '70s Show; Debra Messing – Will & Grace; Megan Mullally – Will & Grace; Laura Prepon – That '70s Show
Choice Reality TV Show	Choice Breakout TV Star: Male
**The Osbournes**; American Idol; Becoming; Blind Date; Fear Factor; The Jamie Kennedy Experiment; The Real World: Chicago; Total Request Live	**Tom Welling – Smallville**; Zach Braff – Scrubs; Steve Howey – Reba; Jack Osbourne – The Osbournes; Michael Rosenbaum – Smallville; Kiefer Sutherland – 24; Milo Ventimiglia – Gilmore Girls; Kevin Weisman – Alias
Choice Breakout TV Star: Female	Choice Breakout TV Show
**Kelly Osbourne – The Osbournes**; Sarah Chalke – Scrubs; Sarah Clarke – 24; Dee Dee Davis – The Bernie Mac Show; Jennifer Garner – Alias; Kristin Kreuk – Smallville; Allison Mack – Smallville; Melissa Peterman – Reba	**The Bernie Mac Show**; 24; Alias; American Idol; The Osbournes; Reba; Scrubs; Smallville
Choice TV Personality	Choice TV Sidekick
**Ozzy Osbourne**; Ben Curtis; Carson Daly; Andy Dick; Jimmy Fallon; Jamie Kennedy; Ananda Lewis; Jon Stewart	**Alyson Hannigan – Buffy the Vampire Slayer**; Keiko Agena – Gilmore Girls; Allison Mack – Smallville; Busy Philipps – Dawson's Creek; Michael Rosenbaum – Smallville; Erik Per Sullivan – Malcolm in the Middle; Wilmer Valderrama – That '70s Show; Nick Wechsler – Roswell

=== Music ===
Choice Male Artist	Choice Female Artist
**Ja Rule**; Craig David; Enrique Iglesias; Jay-Z; Ludacris; Moby; Nelly; Usher	**Britney Spears**; Mary J. Blige; Janet Jackson; Alicia Keys; Jennifer Lopez; Alanis Morissette; Pink; Shakira
Choice R&B/Hip-Hop/Rap Artist	Choice Single
**Usher**; Mary J. Blige; Eve; Ja Rule; Alicia Keys; Ludacris; Nelly; P. Diddy	**"Girlfriend" – NSYNC feat. Nelly**; "Ain't It Funny" – Jennifer Lopez feat. Ja Rule; "Fallin'" – Alicia Keys; "Get the Party Started" – Pink; "Hey Baby" – No Doubt; "I'm a Slave 4 U" – Britney Spears; "U Don't Have to Call" – Usher; "Whenever, Wherever" – Shakira
Choice Album	Choice R&B/Hip-Hop Track
**Songs in A Minor – Alicia Keys**; 8701 – Usher; Hybrid Theory – Linkin Park; Missundaztood – Pink; No More Drama – Mary J. Blige; Rock Steady – No Doubt; Satellite – P.O.D.; Word of Mouf – Ludacris	**"Ain't It Funny" – Jennifer Lopez feat. Ja Rule**; "Foolish" – Ashanti; "Gangsta Lovin'" – Eve feat. Alicia Keys; "Girlfriend" – NSYNC feat. Nelly; "More Than a Woman" – Aaliyah; "Pass the Courvoisier, Part II" – Busta Rhymes feat. P. Diddy & Pharrell; "Oops (Oh My)" – Tweet feat. Missy Elliott; "What's Luv?" – Fat Joe feat. Ashanti
Choice Rock Track	Choice Love Song
**"Adrienne" – The Calling**; "Blurry" – Puddle of Mudd; "In the End" – Linkin Park; "The Middle" – Jimmy Eat World; "My Sacrifice" – Creed; "Nice to Know You" – Incubus; "Wasting My Time" – Default; "Youth of the Nation" – P.O.D.	**"U Got It Bad" – Usher**; "All You Wanted" – Michelle Branch; "Can't Get You Out of My Head" – Kylie Minogue; "Drowning" – Backstreet Boys; "Gone" – NSYNC; "Hero" – Enrique Iglesias; "Underneath Your Clothes" – Shakira; "Wherever You Will Go" – The Calling
Choice Breakout Music Artist	Choice Music Hook Up (collaboration)
**Ashanti**; B2K; Michelle Branch; The Calling; Vanessa Carlton; Craig David; Alicia Keys; Tweet	**"Girlfriend" – NSYNC feat. Nelly**; "Ain't It Funny" – Jennifer Lopez feat. Ja Rule; "Always on Time" – Ja Rule feat. Ashanti; "Gangsta Lovin'" – Eve feat. Alicia Keys; "I Need a Girl (Part One)" – P. Diddy feat. Usher & Loon; "Pass the Courvoisier, Part II" – Busta Rhymes feat. P. Diddy & Pharrell; "Rainy Dayz" – Mary J. Blige feat. Ja Rule; "What's Luv?" – Fat Joe feat. Ashanti
Choice Summer Song
**"Hot in Herre" – Nelly**; "All You Wanted" – Michelle Branch; "Foolish" – Ashanti; "Gangsta Lovin'" – Eve feat. Alicia Keys; "Hero" – Chad Kroeger feat. Josey Scott; "The Middle" – Jimmy Eat World; "Soak Up the Sun" – Sheryl Crow; "A Thousand Miles" – Vanessa Carlton

=== Miscellaneous ===
Choice Male Hottie	Choice Female Hottie
**Justin Timberlake**; Brandon Boyd; Josh Hartnett; Ashton Kutcher; Brad Pitt; Usher; Tom Welling; Shane West	**Britney Spears**; Jessica Alba; Jennifer Aniston; Cameron Diaz; Sarah Michelle Gellar; Beyoncé Knowles; Jennifer Lopez; Reese Witherspoon
Choice Comedian	Choice Male Athlete
**Adam Sandler**; Mo Collins; Eddie Griffin; Bernie Mac; Mike Myers; Chris Rock; Jon Stewart; Chris Tucker	**Kobe Bryant**; Tony Hawk; Derek Jeter; Danny Kass; Jonny Moseley; Shaquille O'Neal; Apolo Anton Ohno; Alex Rodriguez
Choice Female Athlete
**Michelle Kwan**; Sue Bird; Jennifer Capriati; Kelly Clark; Sasha Cohen; Mia Hamm; Sarah Hughes; Venus Williams
