= Canonical Old Roman Catholic Church =

Small Christian denomination

- Region: Florida, New York, Pennsylvania, and Tennessee
- Founder: John J. Humphreys
- Origin: 1966; St. Petersburg, Florida
- Branched from: Old Roman Catholic Church in England and America
- Congregations: 6
- Members: Unknown
- Official website: caer-glow.rosarychurch.net

The Canonical Old Roman Catholic Church is a small Christian denomination founded in the 1960s.

It was formed in reaction to some of the changes instituted by the Roman Catholic Church as a result of the Second Vatican Council.

== Description ==
In 1966, Anthony Girandola, a Roman Catholic priest, announced that he was married, had been married for some time, and intended to remain both a married man and a Roman Catholic priest. After making his statement regarding his lack of adherence to the clerical celibacy rule of the Roman Catholic Church, he found that he could not find a Roman Catholic church to function in. He then started to organize his own church in Saint Petersburg, Florida.

Girandola became a celebrity, and found that the demands on his time as such increased, limiting the amount of pastoral work he could perform. He thus ordained one of his church members, John J. Humphreys, as a priest to help deal with his pastoral duties. Humphreys left the new church shortly thereafter, forming Our Lady of Good Hope Old Roman Catholic Church under the jurisdiction of Archbishop Richard Arthur Marchenna. Humphreys served as that group's vicar general for several years, until Marchenna ordained Robert Clement as a bishop of the Eucharistic Catholic Church, a church perceived as having a pro-homosexual orientation. Marchenna was then excommunicated by Gerard George Shelley, who, as primate of the Old Catholic Church in England and America, saw himself as Marchenna's superior. Father Humphreys was then himself consecrated as a bishop by Shelley, and formed the Historical and Canonical Old Roman Catholic Church to be Shelley's North American jurisdiction.

After Shelley's death in 1980, Michael Farrell, whom Humphrey's had made a bishop in 1981, succeeded Shelley, only to resign himself shortly thereafter, to be replaced by Emile Rodriguez y Fairfield, the pastor of a small church in East Los Angeles who had been ordained by the Mexican National Catholic Church. Fairfield himself left the position in 1983. He was one of three bishops of the Mexican National Catholic Church line and left to become the leader of that church. The following year, in 1984, Humphreys himself was elected primate of the church.
