= The Scorpion and the Frog =

Modern fable

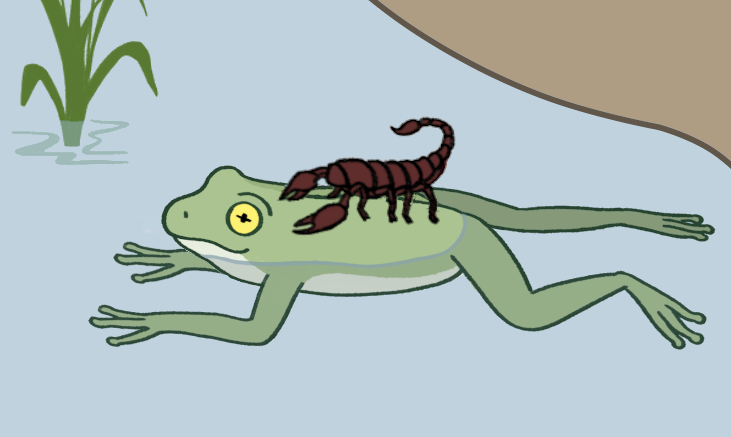
Modern illustration of the frog carrying the scorpion across the river.

The Scorpion and the Frog is an animal fable that seems to have originated in Russia in the early 20th century. The fable teaches that vicious people cannot resist hurting others even when it is not in their own interests and therefore should never be trusted.

== Synopsis ==
A scorpion wants to cross a river but cannot swim, so it asks a frog to carry it across. The frog hesitates, afraid that the scorpion might sting it, but the scorpion promises not to, pointing out that it would drown if it killed the frog in the middle of the river. The frog considers this argument sensible and agrees to transport the scorpion. Midway across the river, the scorpion stings the frog anyway, dooming them both. The dying frog asks the scorpion why it stung despite knowing the consequence, to which the scorpion replies: "I am sorry, but I couldn't help myself. It's my character."

== Origins ==
The earliest known appearance of this fable is in the 1933 Russian novel The German Quarter by Lev Nitoburg. The novel refers to it as an "oriental fairy tale". The fable also appears in the 1944 novel The Hunter of the Pamirs, and this is the earliest known appearance of the fable in English. The Hunter of the Pamirs is an English translation of the 1940 Russian novel Jura by Georgii Tushkan. The fable appears in the final chapter of The Hunter of the Pamirs but does not appear at the corresponding location in the Russian original of Jura, which suggests the translator took some creative liberties.

In the English-speaking world, the fable was made famous by the 1955 film Mr. Arkadin. It is recounted in a monologue by the movie's villain, played by Orson Welles. In an interview, Welles mentioned that the fable is Russian in origin.

== Precursors ==
=== The Scorpion and the Turtle ===
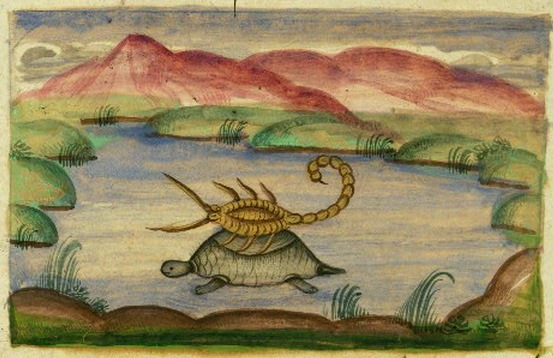
An illustration of "The Scorpion and the Turtle" from a 19th-century edition of the Anvaar Soheili, a Persian collection of fables.

A likely precursor to The Scorpion and the Frog is the Persian fable of The Scorpion and the Turtle, which appears in a number of Persian texts from the late 15th century. These are the Beharistan, written in 1487 by the Persian poet Jami, and the Anvaar Soheili written c. 1500 by the Persian scholar Husayn Kashifi. The Anvaar Soheili contains fables, including those translated from the Panchatantra, a collection of Indian fables written in Sanskrit, but The Scorpion and the Turtle does not appear in the Panchatantra, which suggests that the fable is Persian in origin. (Note: See Tales of Panchatantra (Kathotsav Network) for the complete collection.)

In The Scorpion and the Turtle, it is a turtle that carries the scorpion across the river, and the turtle survives the scorpion's sting thanks to its protective shell. The scorpion explains to the baffled turtle that it could not resist its instinct to sting and knew that its stinger would not pierce the turtle's shell. The turtle then passes judgment on the scorpion. In Kashifi's version, the turtle judges the scorpion to be a "base character" and reproaches itself for not having better character judgment. In Jami's version of the tale, the turtle judges the scorpion to be a "wicked fellow" and drowns the scorpion to prevent it from harming anyone else.

=== Aesop ===
The Scorpion and the Frog is sometimes attributed to Aesop, although it does not appear in any collection of Aesop's fables published before the 20th century. However, there are a number of ancient fables traditionally attributed to Aesop which teach a similar moral, the closest parallels being The Farmer and the Viper and The Frog and the Mouse.

== Interpretations ==
A common interpretation of this fable is that people with vicious personalities cannot resist hurting others even when it is not in their interests. The Italian writer Giancarlo Livraghi has commented that while there are plenty of animal fables which warn against trusting vicious people, in none of these other fables is the villain irrationally self-destructive and fully aware of it.

To a social psychologist, the fable may present a dispositionist view of human nature because it seems to reject the idea that people behave rationally according to circumstances. The French sociologist Jean-Claude Passeron saw the scorpion as a metaphor for politicians who delude themselves by their unconscious tendency to rationalize their ill-conceived plans, and thereby lead themselves and their followers to ruin. The psychologist Kevin Dutton saw the scorpion as a metaphor for psychopaths, whose impulsive and vicious personalities frequently get them into pointless trouble, often hurting the people they depend on such as their own families.

For Orson Welles, who directed Mr. Arkadin, the word "character" had two meanings: it could mean one's natural instincts, but also how one chooses to behave. The scorpion couldn't resist its natural urge to sting, but it also chose to be honest about it to the frog. Orson Welles believed that this frankness gave the scorpion a certain charm and tragic dignity.

== Other contexts ==
Since the fable's narration in Mr. Arkadin, it has been recounted in other films, such as Skin Deep (1989), The Crying Game (1992), Drive (2011), The Devil's Carnival (2012), and Darlings (2022). In addition, references to the fable have appeared in comics, in television shows, as the title of episodes, as well as in newspaper articles, some of which have applied it to the relationship between big business and government and to politics, especially the bitter nature of Middle Eastern politics, such as the Arab–Israeli conflict, or in Iran.

== See also ==
- No-win situation
- The Snake (song)

== Bibliography ==
- Aaron Schuster (2016). The Trouble with Pleasure. Deleuze and Psychoanalysis. Cambridge, Massachusetts: MIT Press. p. 70. ISBN 9780262528597.
- André Bazin; Charles Bitsch; Jean Domarchi (September 1958). "Entretien avec Orson Welles" [Interview with Orson Welles]. Cahiers du Cinéma (in French). Vol. 15, no. 87. Editions de l'Etoile.
  - An English translation of this interview is available on Wellesnet.com (May 22, 2006)
- Arata Takeda (March 2011). "Blumenreiche Handelswege: Ost-westliche Streifzüge auf den Spuren der Fabel Der Skorpion und der Frosch" [Flowery Trade Routes: East-Western forays into the footsteps of the fable The Scorpion and the Frog]. Deutsche Vierteljahrsschrift für Literaturwissenschaft und Geistesgeschichte (in German). 85 (1): 124–152. doi:10.1007/BF03374756. S2CID 170169337.
- Christine van Ruymbeke (2016). Kashefi's Anvar-e Sohayli: Rewriting Kalila wa-Dimna in Timurid Herat. Brill. ISBN 9789004314757.
- Georgii Tushkan (1940). Джура [Jura] (in Russian).
  - Georgi Tushkan (1944) [Original Russian edition published in 1940]. The Hunter of the Pamirs: A Novel of Adventure in Soviet Central Asia. Translated by Gerard Shelley. Hutchinson & Co.
- Ḥusain Vá'iẓ u'l-Kashifí (1854) [First published c. 1500]. The Anvar-i-Suhaili; or The Lights Of Canopus. Translated by Edward B. Eastwick. Stephen Austin.
- Jean-Claude Passeron (2001). "La forme des preuves dans les sciences historiques" [The form of evidence in the historical sciences]. Revue européenne des sciences sociales (in French). 39 (120): 31–76. doi:10.4000/ress.655.
- Lev Nitoburg (1933). Немецкая слобода [The German Quarter] (in Russian). Советская литература [Soviet literature].
- Martin Fitzgerald (2000). Orson Welles: The Pocket Essential Guide. Summersdale Publishers LTD – ROW. ISBN 9781848396807.
- Martin Litchfield West (1984). "The Ascription of Fables to Aesop in Archaic and Classical Greece" (PDF). In Olivier Reverdin (ed.). La Fable (Entretiens Sur L'Antiquité Classique vol. 30). Fondation Hardt.
- Maude Barrows Dutton (1908). The Tortoise and the Geese : and Other Fables of Bidpai. Houghton Mifflin Company.
- Sam Wasson (2011). A Splurch in the Kisser. The Movies of Blake Edwards. Middletown, Connecticut: Wesleyan University Press. p. 296. ISBN 9780819569776.
- Simon Callow (2015). Orson Welles, Volume 3: One-Man Band. Random House. ISBN 9781473545762.
- Stuart Lasine (2012). Weighing Hearts: Character, Judgment, and the Ethics of Reading the Bible. T & T Clark International. ISBN 9780567426741.
- Sylvia M. Vardell (2019). Children's Literature in Action: A Librarian's Guide (3 ed.). ABC-CLIO. ISBN 9781440867798.
- Thomas James (1852). "Fable 21 – The Mouse and the Frog (p. 14)". Aesop's Fables. A New Version, Chiefly From Original Sources. Illustrated by Sir John Tenniel. London: John Murray.
- Kevin Dutton (2012). The Wisdom of Psychopaths. Random House. ISBN 9781409023296.
- Jami (1887) [1487]. Beharistan (PDF).
