= Al Wilson (singer) =

American R&B and soul singer (1939–2008)

Background information
- Born: Allen LaMar Wilson; June 19, 1939; Meridian, Mississippi, U.S.
- Died: April 21, 2008 (aged 68) Fontana, California, U.S.
- Genres: R&B, soul
- Instrument: Vocals
- Years active: 1966–2008
- Labels: Rocky Road, Playboy, RCA, Soul City, Wilsong
- Formerly of: The Jewels, The Rollers, The Souls

Allen LaMar Wilson (June 19, 1939 – April 21, 2008) was an American soul singer known for the million-selling number one hit "Show and Tell". He is also remembered for his Northern soul anthem, "The Snake".

== Background ==
Wilson was born in Meridian, Mississippi. Attending Kate Griffin Elementary, he showed little interest in education but performed in school plays, sang in talent shows and won first prize in a local art contest.

He began his career at the age of twelve leading his own spiritual quartet and singing in the church choir and performing covers of country and western hits. While he was in high school, Wilson and his family relocated to San Bernardino, California, where he worked three jobs as a mail carrier, a janitor, and an office clerk, in addition to teaching himself to play drums. After graduation he spent four years touring with Johnny Harris and the Statesmen, before joining the U.S. Navy and singing with an enlisted men's chorus. He also developed his stand-up comedy routine in case he did not succeed as a singer, and performed at some local clubs.

== Career ==
After a two-year military stint, Wilson settled in Los Angeles, touring the local nightclub circuit before joining the R&B vocal group the Jewels; from there he landed with the Rollers, followed by a stint with the instrumental combo the Souls. In 1966, Wilson signed with manager Marc Gordon, who quickly sought his client an a cappella audition for Johnny Rivers. Wilson was signed to the Soul City imprint and Rivers produced the sessions that yielded the 1968 U.S. R&B hit single "The Snake" (U.S. Pop number 27), which became popular on the Northern soul circuit in the United Kingdom. It also provided Wilson with his only UK Singles Chart hit, reaching number 41 in 1975. The minor hit "Do What You Gotta Do" appeared that same year. In 1969, Wilson charted with his cover of Creedence Clearwater Revival's "Lodi" (U.S. number 67), and Rivers' own "Poor Side Of Town" (U.S. number 75).

Wilson disappeared from the music industry until 1973, when he released his major hit, "Show And Tell", written and produced by Jerry Fuller, the man behind the run of hit singles by Gary Puckett & The Union Gap in the late 1960s. Topping the Hot 100, the song on the Rocky Road label, owned by his manager, Marc Gordon, also reached number 10 in the Billboard R&B chart. The resulting album's success was matched by the single, which sold well over one million copies and was awarded a gold disc by the R.I.A.A. in December 1973.

"The La La Peace Song", released in 1974, was another success, although O. C. Smith recorded and released a version simultaneously, causing sales of Wilson's version to suffer as a result. Two years later in 1976, Wilson recorded "I've Got a Feeling, We'll Be Seeing Each Other Again" for Playboy Records, produced by his manager, Marc Gordon. Although it reached number 3 on the R&B chart, Wilson tried to leave Playboy Records but was unable to get a release from his recording contract. Two years later, the label folded. With 1979's "Count the Days" recorded in Philadelphia for Roadshow Records, Wilson scored his final chart hit and he spent the next two decades touring clubs and lounges. In 2001, he re-recorded his hits for the album Spice of Life.

In March 2007, many of his original master tapes were lost to a fire that swept through his home garage which he had converted into a recording studio.

Wilson's recording of "The Snake" was featured in a Lambrini advert in the UK, as well as in a Pennsylvania Rally by President Donald Trump.

== Confusion ==
For some time there has been speculation and discussion among some Northern soul collectors and enthusiasts that the single "Help Me", composed and produced by Johnny Northern and Ralph Bailey, arranged by Robert Banks, is not the same Al Wilson who recorded "The Snake". It is believed by some that this may be a completely different singer who happened to have the same name. The song was released on Wand Records in 1966. And Record World mentioned in the September 17, 1966 issue that the label's two newest releases were "Too Much Too Soon" by Shirley & Jesse, and "Help Me" by Al Wilson". The Soul Express website stated "the singer on this single is J.R. Bailey".

The song actually made the UK chart and got to number 52 in September 1974.

Due to the enthusiasm from the Northern soul crowd with the song, Wilson had to quickly learn the song and performed it at the Cleethorpes Northern soul Weekender where he was booked. He did inform the crowd that he was not the same Al Wilson who recorded this Northern soul favorite.

== Death ==
Wilson died on April 21, 2008, of kidney failure, in Fontana, California, at the age of 68. He was buried at the Evergreen Cemetery in Riverside, California.

== Discography ==
=== Studio albums ===
Year	Album	Chart positions		Record label
Year	Album	US	US R&B	Record label
1968	Searching for the Dolphins	—	—	Soul City
1973	Weighing In	—	—	Rocky Road
1973	Show and Tell	70	9	Rocky Road
1974	La La Peace Song	171	35	Rocky Road
1976	I've Got a Feeling	185	43	Playboy
1979	Count the Days	—	—	Roadshow
"—" denotes the album failed to chart

=== Compilation albums ===
Year	Album	Chart positions		Record label
Year	Album	US	US R&B	Record label
2001	Spice of Life	—	—	Classic World
2004	Show & Tell: The Best of Al Wilson	—	—	Fuel 2000
"—" denotes the album failed to chart

=== Singles ===
Year	Single	Chart positions					
Year	Single	US	US R&B	US A/C	CAN	UK	AUS
1967	"Who Could Be Lovin' You"	—	—	—	—	—	—
1967	"Do What You Gotta Do"	—	39	—	85	—	38
1968	"The Snake"	27	32	—	38	41	—
1969	"Poor Side of Town"	75	—	—	54	—	—
1969	"I Stand Accused"	—	—	—	—	—	—
1969	"Lodi"	67	—	—	51	—	—
1970	"Mississippi Woman"	—	—	—	—	—	—
1970	"Bachelor Man"	—	—	—	—	—	
1971	"I Hear You Knocking"	—	—	—	—	—	—
1971	"Falling (In Love with You)"	—	—	—	—	—	—
1972	"Heavy Church"	—	—	—	—	—	—
1972	"Born on the Bayou"	—	—	—	—	—	—
1973	"Show and Tell"	1	10	3	7	59 (Note: Chart position is from the official UK "Breakers List".)	57
1974	"Touch and Go"	57	23	43	74	—	—
1974	"La La Peace Song"	30	19	—	45	—	—
1974	"I Won't Last a Day Without You"/"Let Me Be the One" (medley)	70	18	39	—	—	—
1975	"The Snake"	—	—	—	—	41	—
1976	"I've Got a Feeling (We'll Be Seeing Each Other Again)"	29	3	38	63	—	—
1976	"Baby I Want Your Body"	—	28	—	—	—	—
1976	"You Did It for Me"	—	—	—	—	—	—
1979	"Count the Days"	—	84	—	—	—	—
1979	"Earthquake"	—	—	—	—	—	—
"—" denotes the single failed to chart
