= Girandola =

Girandola (from Italian) may refer to:

- Girandola (candlestick)
- Girandola (firework)
- Anthony Girandola
