= Into Your Head =

Studio album by BBMak
- Released: 27 August 2002 (US); 18 November 2002 (UK)
- Recorded: January – June 2002
- Genre: Pop rock
- Length: 39:12
- Label: Hollywood
- Producers: Al Clay; Rob Cavallo; Guy Chambers; Steve Power; Jon Lind; Stephen Lironi; BBMak

BBMak chronology
Sooner or Later (2000)	Into Your Head (2002)	Powerstation (2019)

Singles from Into Your Head
- 1. "Out of My Heart (Into Your Head)" Released: 4 November 2002; 2. "Staring Into Space" Released: 5 February 2003

Professional ratings
Review scores
Source	Rating
AllMusic	4/5 stars
Entertainment Weekly	B
People	(favorable)
Rolling Stone	2/5 stars

Into Your Head is the second studio album by the English music group BBMak, released on 27 August 2002 by Hollywood Records. It peaked at #25 in the US, spawning the hit single "Out of My Heart". The album is an enhanced CD, containing regular audio tracks and multimedia computer files.

The Japanese edition of the 2002 album includes two exclusive bonus tracks, "So Wrong So Right" and "Never Gonna Give You Up", as well as the enhanced videos to "Back Here" and "Still On Your Side".

== Track listing ==
All songs written by BBMak. Additional writers are listed, where applicable.

No.	Title	Writer(s)	Producer(s)	Length
1.	"Out Of My Heart (Into Your Head)"	Tony & Chris Griffiths	Rob Cavallo	4:04
2.	"Staring Into Space"	Guy Chambers	Guy Chambers, Steve Power	3:57
3.	"Get You Through the Night"		Al Clay, BBMak	3:33
4.	"After All Is Said and Done"	Stephen Lironi	Stephen Lironi	3:30
5.	"Out of Reach"		Cavallo, Jon Lind, BBMak	4:25
6.	"She's Everything"	Mick Lister	Clay	3:28
7.	"Run Away"	Nuno Bettencourt	Clay	3:56
8.	"Sympathy"		Cavallo	4:11
9.	"I Still Believe"	Tony & Chris Griffiths	Clay	3:18
10.	"The Beginning"	Tony & Chris Griffiths	Clay	4:49

== Charts ==
=== Weekly charts ===
Chart (2002)	Peak position
Japanese Albums (Oricon)	63
US Billboard 200	25
