= J. R. Bailey =

American musician

James Ralph Bailey (June 17, 1937 – September 6, 1985) was an American R&B singer and songwriter. A member of The Cadillacs from 1956 to 1972, he also recorded as a solo artist. He worked as a background vocalist for singers such as Aretha Franklin, Roberta Flack, Donny Hathaway, Melvin Van Peebles and Jimmy Castor.

== Biography ==
Bailey was born on June 17, 1937, in Baltimore, Maryland. He was a member of doo-wop groups The Halos, The Cadillacs, and The Crickets (not Buddy Holly's Crickets), and also recorded as a solo artist. He also co-wrote several hits with songwriter Ken Williams; the songs included "Everybody Plays the Fool" by The Main Ingredient, "Sweet Music, Soft Lights and You" by Isaac Hayes & Millie Jackson, "Love, Love, Love", which he released in 1972 and was covered the following year by Donny Hathaway, and "Just Me And You" by Erasmus Hall. He also co-wrote songs with New York singer Vernon Harrell (who had performed with The Coasters). "Soul Shing-A-Ling" and "Seven Days Too Long" by Chuck Wood in 1966, and "Sweet, Sweet Lovin'" by The Platters in 1967 were among songs written by Bailey and Harrell. The pair also co-wrote Harrell's release "Do It to It" in 1969 on Calla Records with J. Robinson. His song "Let Me Prove My Love to You", which was originally performed by The Main Ingredient, was sampled for Alicia Keys' 2003 single "You Don't Know My Name".

== Career ==
He began his solo career in 1965, releasing records as Jimmy Bailey on Columbia Records. Bailey released a record on Calla Records in 1968 called "Love Won't Wear Off." It was written and produced by Billy Guy of The Coasters. Bailey and Billy Guy had a record company called GuyJim Records.

Bailey co-wrote the song, "Help Me" with Johnny Northern. The production was handled by Robert Banks. It was released on Wand WND 1135 in 1966. It was credited to Al Wilson, but the singer was not the famous Al Wilson. The song was released on Wand Records in 1966. And Record World mentioned in the September 17, 1966 issue that the label's two newest releases were "Too Much Too Soon" by Shirley & Jesse, and "Help Me" by Al Wilson".

== Death ==
He died on September 6, 1985, in New York City.

== Discography ==
- Just Me n' You (MAM #5011) (1974)
- Love and Conversation (United Artists #815) (1977)
