= Help Me (J. R. Bailey song) =

"Help Me (Vocal)"

Song by Al Wilson
- B-side: "Help Me (instrumental)"
- Released: 1966
- Label: Wand Records WND 1135
- Songwriter(s): Johnny Northern - Ralph Bailey
- Producer(s): Johnny Northern, Ralph Bailey; Arranger: Robert Banks

"Help Me" is a single credited to a singer going by the name of Al Wilson, but not the well-known soul singer. It was originally released in 1966. It gained popularity on the Northern Soul scene and became a hit in 1974.

== Background ==
This single "Help Me" has been the source of speculation and discussion among some Northern soul collectors and enthusiasts. It is composed and produced by Johnny Northern and Ralph Bailey and arranged by Robert Banks. The belief now leans towards the understanding that this Al Wilson on the record is not the same Al Wilson who recorded "The Snake". It is now believed by some that this may be a completely different singer who happened to use the same name.

The Soul Express Website says "the singer on this single is J.R. Bailey".

The song is at no. 149 on the Ein Kurzüberblick über die vielleicht wichtigsten Top700-Northern-Soul-Hits list.

== Release ==
The song was first released on Wand Records in 1966. Record World mentioned in the September 17, 1966, issue that the label's two newest releases were "Too Much Too Soon" by Shirley & Jesse, and "Help Me" by Al Wilson". It was released on Pye International Disco Demand in August 1974. It was reviewed in Blues & Soul issue no. 143, September 10, 1974. The reviewer said that it was a proven winner in Northern discos and was certain to appeal to those who bought the previous releases from the Disco Demand series.

== Charts ==
The single reached No. 54 in the UK chart in September 1974.

== Later years ==
Because of the Northern Soul crowd's enthusiasm with the song, and the belief that the real Al Wilson himself sang it, he had to quickly learn the song and performed it at the Cleethorpes Northern Soul Weekender where he was booked. He did inform the crowd that he was not the same Al Wilson who recorded this Northern Soul favorite.
