= Out of My Heart (Into Your Head) =

2002 single by BBMak

Single by BBMak

from the album Into Your Head
- Released: 25 June 2002
- Length: 4:06
- Label: Telstar
- Songwriters: Christian Burns; Mark Barry; Stephen McNally; Tony Griffiths; Chris Griffiths
- Producer: Rob Cavallo

BBMak singles chronology
"Ghost of You and Me" (2001)	"Out of My Heart (Into Your Head)" (2002)	"Staring Into Space" (2003)

Music video
- "Out of My Heart (Into Your Head)" on YouTube

"Out of My Heart (Into Your Head)" is a song by British pop rock band BBMak. It was written by the three members of the group (Christian Burns, Mark Barry, and Stephen McNally) along with songwriters Tony and Chris Griffiths. It was released in June 2002 as the lead single from their second studio album, Into Your Head (2002). The song reached number 56 on the US Billboard Hot 100, number 36 on the UK singles chart, and number 19 on the New Zealand Singles Chart.

== Background ==
Writing for BBMak's follow-up album to Sooner or Later began in August 2001. "Out of My Heart (Into Your Head" was the first song the group wrote. Of the song, band member Stephen McNally said,

"We wrote 'Out Of My Heart' in Liverpool with lads, the Griffiths brothers who were in a band called The Real People. It was dead easy writing this song, we did it in an hour. It was one of them things. We sat round with guitars going over melody and lyric ideas and an hour later it was done. It's about the beginning of a relationship when you're falling in love and the feeling you get when it's great".

== Reception ==
Chuck Taylor of Billboard wrote the song is "world pop music for 2002 at its most inspired, meshing full bodied acoustic instrumentation with radiant, masterful vocals and swirling harmonies".

== Music video ==
The music video was directed by Katie Bell and shot in Oak Island, North Carolina as well as Screen Gems Studios in Wilmington. It premiered on AOL Music on 28 June 2002. BBMak premiered the video on TRL on 30 July 2002.

The video takes place at a beach party where BBMak is entertaining with friends, playing volleyball and surfing. In other scenes, BBMak is shown singing on a water-covered stage with a full band in front of a large backdrop that displays imagery of the sky and sea. The video reached the number 5 spot on TRL in August 2002.

== Charts ==
=== Weekly charts ===
Weekly chart performance for "Out of My Heart (Into Your Head)"
Chart (2002–2003)	Peak position
Australia (ARIA)	65
Canada (Nielsen SoundScan)	22
Canada CHR (Nielsen BDS)	20
New Zealand (Recorded Music NZ)	19
Scotland Singles (OCC)	33
UK Singles (OCC)	36
US Billboard Hot 100	56
US Adult Contemporary (Billboard)	25
US Adult Pop Airplay (Billboard)	23
US Pop Airplay (Billboard)	20

=== Year-end charts ===
Year-end chart performance for "Out of My Heart (Into Your Head)"
Chart (2002)	Position
Canada (Nielsen SoundScan)	191
US Adult Top 40 (Billboard)	79
US Mainstream Top 40 (Billboard)	89

== Release history ==
Release dates and formats for "Out of My Heart (Into Your Head)"
Region	Date	Format(s)	Label(s)	Ref.
United States	25 June 2002	Radio	Hollywood	
United Kingdom	4 November 2002	CD	Telstar	
Australia	20 January 2003	CD	Warner Music Australia	
