= Stephen McNally (musician) =

British musician

- Born: Stephen Patrick McNally; 4 July 1978 (age 48); Liverpool, England, UK
- Genres: Pop, rock, dance
- Occupations: Singer, songwriter
- Instruments: Vocals, guitar
- Years active: 1996–present
- Labels: Hollywood Records, Telstar Records, Spincredible Records
- Website: http://www.bbmak.com

Stephen Patrick McNally (born 4 July 1978) is an English singer and songwriter, best known for his work with BBMak.

== Biography ==
McNally began playing guitar in 1990 and had occasional lessons from Cast lead guitarist Liam Tyson. He then formed his first band, The Mist, with some high school friends and started writing songs.

From 1996 to 2003, McNally was a singer and lead guitarist of English pop rock band BBMak, along with Mark Barry and Christian Burns. Together they sold over three million albums worldwide. Their biggest single, "Back Here", was #1 in the US and across Asia.

In 2003 after BBMAK split, McNally began writing songs for a solo album with Ricky Ross, Karl Wallinger, and The Real People members Tony and Chris Griffiths. The following year, McNally began recording a solo album in France with record producer James Sanger and drummer Ash Soan but abandoned the project later that year.

In 2006, McNally formed covers band Groove Nation with friend and Broadway drummer Darren Andrews. That same year, McNally was contacted by former manager Diane Young about potentially becoming a vocalist with new line up of Mike and the Mechanics.

In 2007, McNally entered the fourth series of The X Factor.

In 2009, McNally became the lead singer for the band 10 Reasons to Live.

In 2015, was a vocal/guitar coach for Jake McKechnie who in 2017 was a finalist on the first series of The Voice Kids.

In 2018, BBMak officially reformed to work on a new album and tour.

In 2020, McNally formed the band The Last Arcade with his writing and producing partners from Firebox productions, Paul Garrett and Steve Erickson.

McNally is also an accomplished martial artist with over 30 years of training in Muay Thai & kickboxing; he is a 3rd degree black belt and a former British, European & 3x world kickboxing champion.

== Discography ==
=== Albums ===
==== BBMak ====
- Sooner or Later (2000) US #38 UK #16
- Into Your Head (2002) US #25
- Powerstation (2019)

==== Movie soundtracks with BBMak ====
- The Princess Diaries (2001) US#5
- BBMak in America (DVD) (2001)
- BBMak Live in Vietnam (DVD) (2001)
- On the Line (2001) US#2
- Treasure Planet (2002)
- Return to Never Land (2002)

==== 10 Reasons to Live ====
- In These Times (acoustic EP) (2009)
- City Life (studio album) (2011)
- Being Liverpool (TV documentary/DVD) (2012)
- Universal (studio album) (2013)
- Rise and Fall (studio album) (2017)
- In These Times (studio album) (2017)
- Private Glory (studio album) (2022)

==== The Last Arcade ====
- Timelines (studio album) (2024)

==== Other credits ====
- Michael Scout - "All This I Know" (2010) (vocals)
- Michael Scout - "Forever" (2013) (vocals)
- Koele Vaten - "Bullet In Your Heart" (2014) (writer/vocals)
- Sosumi & Hardino - "Higher Love" (2014) (vocals)
- Bert Van Engel - "Live Forever" (2016) (writer/vocals)
- DJ NYK – "Living Kings" (2016) (writer/vocals)
- DJ NYK – "Wild Horses" (2017) (writer)
- Firebox vs. Hard Time - "Go" (2021) (writer/vocals)

=== Singles ===
==== BBMak ====
- 1999 – "Back Here" #37 UK
- 1999 – "Still on Your Side" (Asia release)
- 1999 – "Still on Your Side" Artful Dodger Remix
- 2000 – "Back Here" (re-release) #5 UK, #13 US, #1 US (Adult Contemporary)
- 2001 – "Still on Your Side" #8 UK, #54 U.S.
- 2001 – "Ghost of You and Me" #8 US (Adult Contemporary)
- 2001 – "Love Is Leaving" (Asia only release)
- 2001 – "If I Could Fly" (Asia only release)
- 2002 – "Out of My Heart (Into Your Head)" #56 US, #25 US (Adult Contemporary)
- 2003 – "Staring into Space" (Asia only release)
- 2019 – "Bullet Train"
- 2019 – "So Far Away"
- 2019 – "Uncivil War"
- 2019 – "Wolves"
- 2023 – "Painting Lights"
- 2024 – "Collide" (BBMak & The Last Arcade)

==== 10 Reasons to Live ====
- 2010 – "Christmas Time"
- 2012 – "Breathe"
- 2013 – "Pushing Me On"
- 2015 – "Change"
- 2017 – "Progress"
- 2020 – "Better Days"
- 2022 – "Long Time Dead"

==== The Last Arcade ====
- 2021 – "When We Were Young"
- 2021 – "People Like Us"
- 2021 – "If Not Us"
- 2022 – "Stay"
- 2022 – "Lights"
- 2022 – "Miss You"
- 2023 – "Nobody Knows"
- 2023 – "Time of Our Lives"
- 2023 – "The Last Arcade"
- 2024 – "Collide" (BBMak & The Last Arcade)
- 2025 – "Older"
- 2025 – "Looking for Love"
- 2026 – "Why Did You Leave Me" (featuring Tricia McTeague)
- 2026 – "Grace"
