= La La Peace Song (Al Wilson album) =

Studio album by Al Wilson
- Released: 1974
- Genre: Soul
- Label: Rocky Road RR 3700
- Producer: Johnny Bristol; Steve Cropper; Jerry Fuller

Al Wilson chronology
Show and Tell (1973)	La La Peace Song (1974)	I've Got A Feeling (1976)

Singles from La La Peace Song
- 1. "La La Peace Song" Released: September 1974; 2. "Medley: "I Won't Last A Day Without You" / "Let Me Be The One" Released: December 1974

La La Peace Song is a 1974 album by American singer Al Wilson. It came out in the same year as O. C. Smith's album of the same name. Both contain renditions of the song "La La Peace Song", and both albums were co-produced by Johnny Bristol.

A full-page ad for Al Wilson's single "La La Peace Song" appeared on page 75 of the September 28, 1974 issue of Billboard. A section of the page also featured his album. On the following page 76, O. C. Smith's single "La La Peace Song" had just entered the Hot 100 chart at 91.

Wilson's album was produced by Johnny Bristol, Jerry Fuller and Steve Cropper. It got a decent review in the October 5, 1974 issue of Billboard with the strong backup instrumentals being noted. Also the reviewer mentioned that it was full of potential singles, with the picks being "La La Peace Song", "Passport", "I'm A Weak Man", "The Longer We Stay Together" and "Willoughby Brook Road". By November 30, 1974, it was at its sixth week in the Soul chart and had moved up one from 37 to no 36. By January 4, 1975, it had spent 11 weeks in the Soul Chart and had dropped from 47 to 56.

== Track listing ==
No	Title	Composer	Time
A1	"La La Peace Song"	L. Martin*, J. Bristol*	3:22
A2	"A Stones Throw"	Jerry Fuller	3:04
A3	Medley: "I Won't Last A Day Without You" / "Let Me Be The One"	Paul Williams, Roger Nichols	5:52
A4	"Goin' Through The Motions"	Jerry Tawney	3:16
A5	"Passport"	H.B. Barnum, Jerry Fuller	2:37
B1	"I'm A Weak Man"	Eddie Campbell	3:24
B2	"Fifty-Fifty"	Jerry Fuller	3:08
B3	"The Longer We Stay Together"	Richard Cason	4:58
B4	"Willoughby Brook"	Richard Cason	3:43
B5	"You're The One Thing (Keeps Me Goin')"	Jerry Fuller	3:07
