= Back Here =

1999 single by BBMak

Single by BBMak

from the album Sooner or Later
- B-side: "Miss You More"
- Released: 16 August 1999
- Studio: Hollywood (Hollywood, California)
- Length: 3:39
- Label: Telstar
- Songwriters: Christian Burns; Mark Barry; Stephen McNally; Phil Thornalley
- Producers: Oliver Leiber; John Shanks

BBMak singles chronology
"Back Here" (1999)	"Still on Your Side" (2000)

Music video
- "Back Here" on YouTube

"Back Here" is a song by English pop rock band BBMak. It was written by the three members of the group (Christian Burns, Mark Barry, and Stephen McNally) along with songwriter Phil Thornalley. It was originally released in August 1999 as the lead single from their debut studio album, Sooner or Later (2000), but did not experience commercial success until its American release the following year, when it became a top-20 hit in the United States. The song was then re-released in the United Kingdom and entered the top five of the UK Singles Chart in February 2001. Rolling Stone ranked it as the 63rd-greatest boy band song of all time.

== Content ==
Stephen McNally told Billboard that the song "Back Here" was deceiving due to its uptempo guitar part and the song sounding happy. He went on to say that it was about a "guy and a girl getting together, then the girl leaves the guy and now he can't live without her." Of the song's background, Christian Burns said "['Back Here'] came together really quickly. We were having coffee with Phil [Thornalley] at his flat, and we were just messing around with chords; we wrote the whole song in about 45 minutes'". Burns added, “I remember when we heard that guitar intro for the first time. We flew over to Hollywood to go and work on the record in the Hills with [producers] John Shanks and Oliver Leiber, walked into the studio and the intro was on loop. We all looked at each other and knew something magical was cooking here".

== Release ==
Originally released in the United Kingdom on 16 August 1999, it reached number 37 on the UK Singles Chart that same month. Japanese radio stations eventually began playing the song which resulted in their overseas label Telstar scrambling to get the group to Asia for promotion. The song subsequently topped the charts of several Asian countries.

In the United States, "Back Here" was released on 27 March 2000 and eventually reached number 13 on the US Billboard Hot 100. It became a mainstay on pop radio and on the MTV show Total Request Live in the summer of 2000. The song also charted in Canada, peaking at number 11 on the RPM Top Singles chart. On 12 February 2001, following the song's success in America, the single was re-released in the United Kingdom and made the top 10 this time around, debuting and peaking at number five.

== Music videos ==
There are two versions of the video. The first, made for a UK release, was filmed in Los Angeles and directed by Dani Jacobs. The second version, intended for a US release, was again directed by Jacobs and was filmed in London in March 2000. It features the band performing on the platform of Canary Wharf DLR station and in the London Eye as they try to earn the attention of a woman who passes by and gives them a tip near the end of the video.

== Track listings ==
UK CD1 (1999)

1. "Back Here"
2. "Back Here" (extended version)
3. "Back Here" (video)

UK CD2 (1999)

1. "Back Here"
2. "Miss You More"
3. "More Than Words"

Japanese CD single (1999)

1. "Back Here"
2. "Back Here" (extended version)
3. "Miss You More"

Australian CD single (2000)

1. "Back Here"
2. "Back Here" (extended version)
3. "Miss You More"
4. "Back Here" (video)

US CD single (2000)

1. "Back Here" – 3:38
2. "Miss You More" – 5:08
3. "I'm Not in Love" / "Next Time" / "I Can Tell" – 2:46

US cassette single (2000)

A1. "Back Here" – 3:38
A2. "I'm Not in Love" / "Next Time" / "I Can Tell" – 2:46
B1. "Miss You More" – 5:06

European CD single (2001)

1. "Back Here 2001" – 3:41
2. "Back Here" (acoustic version) – 3:39

UK and Australian CD single (2001)

1. "Back Here 2001"
2. "Back Here" (acoustic version)
3. "More Than Words"
4. Enhanced CD-ROM

UK cassette single (2001)

1. "Back Here 2001"
2. "Back Here" (acoustic version)
3. "More Than Words"

== Credits and personnel ==
Credits are adapted from the UK CD1 liner notes.

Locations

- Recorded at Hollywood Studios (Hollywood, California)
- Mixed at Royaltone Studios (California)
- Artwork designed at Blade

BBMak

- Christian Burns – writing
- Mark Barry – writing
- Stephen McNally – writing

Additional musicians

- John Shanks – guitars, production
- Mark Browne – bass
- Matt Laug – drums

Other personnel

- Phil Thornalley – writing
- Oliver Leiber – production
- Barry Rudolph – engineering
- Marc DeSisto – mixing
- Norman Watson – photography
- Nick Foss – styling
- Rachel Howarth – make up

== Charts ==
=== Weekly charts ===
Chart (1999)	Peak position
Scottish Singles Sales (Official Charts)	43
UK Singles (Official Charts)	37

Chart (2000–2001)	Peak position
Australia (ARIA)	47
Belgium (Ultratop 50 Flanders)	42
Canada Top Singles (RPM)	11
Canada Airplay (Nielsen BDS)	11
Canada Adult Contemporary (RPM)	6
Europe (Eurochart Hot 100)	27
Europe (European Hit Radio)	34
Ireland (IRMA)	27
Netherlands (Single Top 100)	91
New Zealand (Recorded Music NZ)	18
Scottish Singles Sales (Official Charts)	5
Spain Airplay (Top 40 Radio)	30
Sweden (Sverigetopplistan)	39
UK Singles (Official Charts)	5
UK Airplay (Music Week)	10
US Billboard Hot 100	13
US Adult Contemporary (Billboard)	1
US Adult Pop Airplay (Billboard)	12
US Pop Airplay (Billboard)	9
US Adult Contemporary (Radio & Records)	1
US CHR/Pop Top 50 (Radio & Records)	8
US Hot AC (Radio & Records)	11

=== Year-end charts ===
Chart (2000)	Position
US Billboard Hot 100	33
US Adult Contemporary (Billboard)	21
US Adult Top 40 (Billboard)	34
US Mainstream Top 40 (Billboard)	24
US Adult Contemporary (Radio & Records)	20
US Hot AC (Radio & Records)	37

Chart (2001)	Position
Canada Radio (Nielsen BDS)	77
UK Singles (OCC)	110
US Adult Contemporary (Billboard)	12

== Release history ==
Region	Date	Format(s)	Label(s)	Ref(s).
United Kingdom	16 August 1999	2× CD	Telstar	
Japan	20 November 1999	CD	Victor	
United States	27 March 2000	Hot adult contemporary; modern adult contemporary radio	Hollywood	
United States	28 March 2000	Contemporary hit radio	Hollywood	
United States	11 April 2000	CD; cassette	Hollywood	
United Kingdom (reissue)	12 February 2001	CD; cassette	Telstar	
