= Gerard Shelley =

British linguist, author and translator

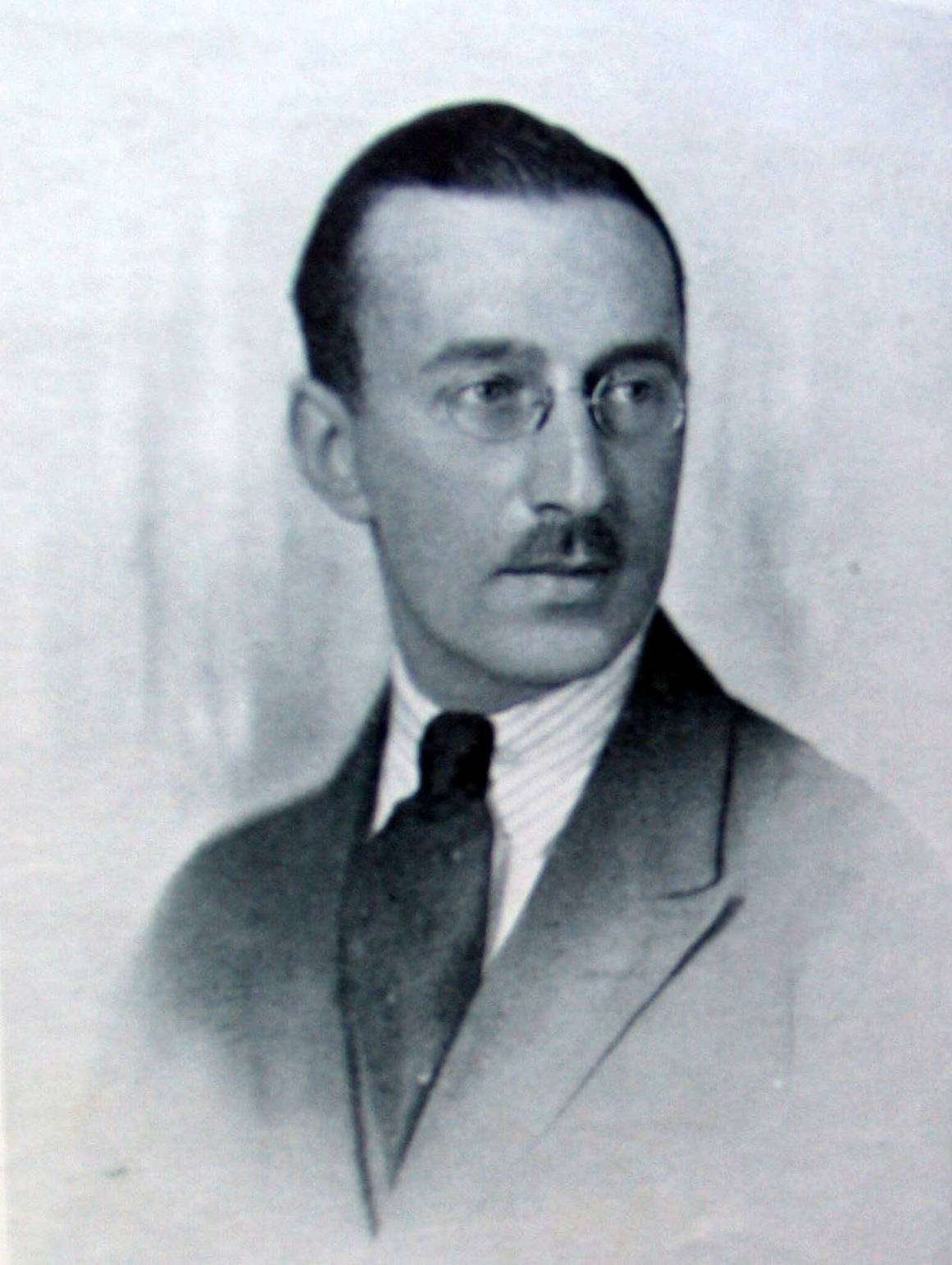
Shelley in 1925, from his book The Speckled Domes

George Frankham Shell known as George Gerard Shelley (Sidcup, Kent 1891 – 24 August 1980) was a British linguist, author and translator who travelled in Imperial Russia before and during the Russian Revolution. He became a priest and lived in a community of the Oblates of St. Joseph. He was ordained in March 1950 as a bishop in the Old Roman Catholic Church in Great Britain (ORCCGB). In 1952 he became the third archbishop.

== Life ==
Brought up as a Roman Catholic, Shelley attended an Italian college near Lake Garda in 1907. Near Venice he was invited by a Russian aristocrat, Countess Bobrinsky, to visit her. He was a graduate of the University of Heidelberg as well as the Major Seminary and Collège Saint-Sulpice in Paris. In 1913, influenced by Stephen Graham, he travelled by train from Warsaw to Kursk, Kharkov, Belgorod and Shebekino where he stayed for a year with his host and learned Russian at Kharkov University. (He already spoke French, German, and Italian from an early age.) After World War I broke out he worked as an interpreter for various groups of prisoners of war. In April 1915 he stayed on the family estate in Bogoroditsk; he visited Moscow and met with Grigori Rasputin in the atelier of a sculptor, probably Naoum Aronson. On 26 March, Rasputin is said, while inebriated, to have opened his trousers and waved his "reproductive organ" in front of a group of female gypsy singers in the Yar restaurant. A few days later a waiter assessed the story to Shelley as bunkum.

In St. Peterburg, Shelley met with Count Vladimir Frederiks, and again with Rasputin and the Empress, accompanied by her daughter Grand Duchess Tatiana, drinking tea in his apartment. Rasputin visited him also, when Shelley was camping at Lake Ladoga in 1916.

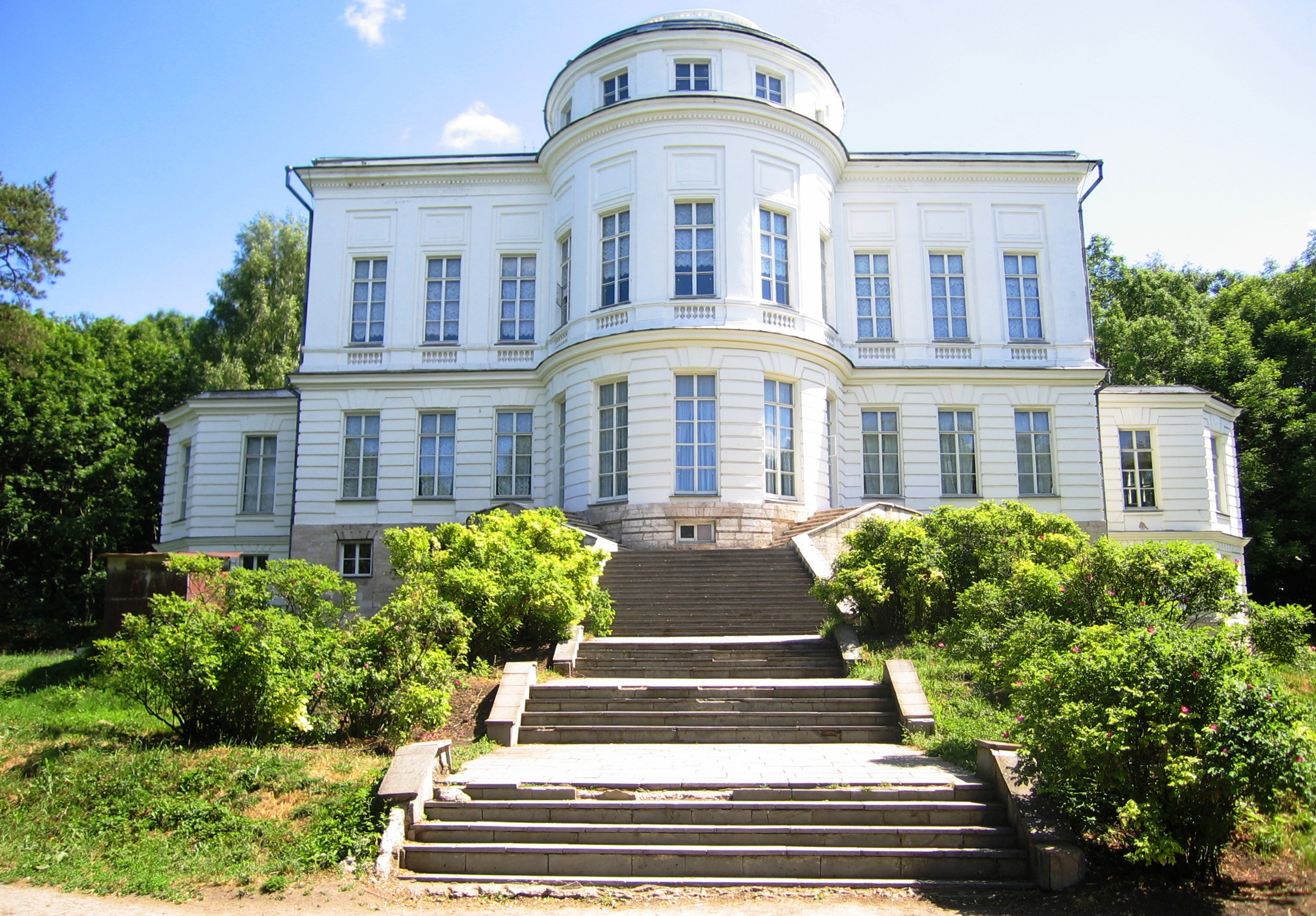
Palace of the Bobrinsky family

Tired out, I soon dropped off to sleep. I was wakened some time later by the sound of singing. Looking round, I saw the figure of Rasputin standing dark against the shimmering surface of the vast lake. The white night was already melting into the glow of sunrise, the far waters beyond the shadow of the forest seeming to rise into the air on shining wings. White flashes of sheet lightning darted across the horizon like the rhythmic sweep of a giant wing. The tree-tops swayed in the light breeze with a lulling rustle, while the cries of the awakening wild fowl resounded in the hollow depths of the mossy, waylays forest. In this choir of nature, the voice of the Staretz, singing some melodious, half-melancholy hymn or psalm of old Slavonic, rose and fell like the wave of sound from a deep-toned bell. Somehow it struck me that I was listening to a wonderful old prophet of the desert singing his lamentations over the waters of Babylon. I listened attentively and concluded that he was singing the Lamentations of Jeremiah, whose voice of threatening prophecy he was fond of making his own.

In December of the same year, Shelley went back to the UK for Christmas and defended Rasputin. In his book "The speckled domes" he describes Rasputin as an ascetic, an old testament prophet, or as a medieval figure from the pages of Chaucer. "Although a peasant he had clear ideas on a host of matters." Most stories known about Rasputin, being filthy, smelly, or drunk, were invented [or exaggerated] by the Russian aristocracy, because they hated peasants, already for centuries. According to Shelley, Russia was a caste society and "perhaps no man in history has been so furiously calumniated."

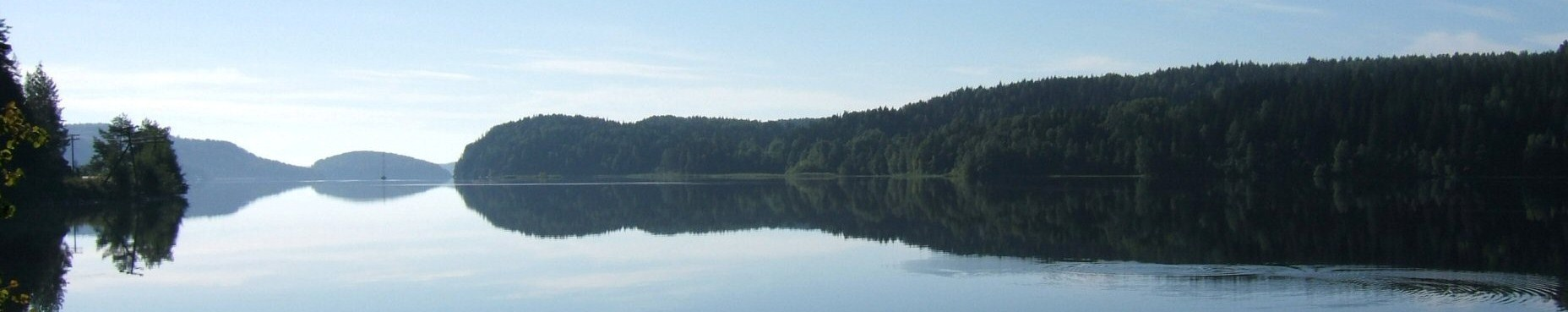
View on Lake Ladoga where Shelley and his friend sat with Rasputin who also arrived by boat

In January, Shelley went back to the Russian Republic. Shelley gives an account of the mood after the February Revolution and gives his view on the Russian Provisional Government, Lenin and the October Revolution. Back in Moscow he wrote about free love and the changing attitude to marriage in the early years of communist Russia; the murdering of Tsar Nicholas II (at that time it was not known the whole family was killed); the socialists, the anarchists, the Jews in the Bolshevik party (see also Jewish Bolshevism); the famine, the ruble, the escape of Alexander Krivoshein, his meetings with the wife of Mikhail Pokrovsky and Sinn Féin. Shelley was accused of being a counter-revolutionary and unable to leave the country as a hostage. He escaped, dressed as a woman, stuck under the seats in a train from Moscow to Finland surrounded by a group of French women, who together bribed the chief Red Guard. He arrived in Sweden where he had his first decent meal in months.

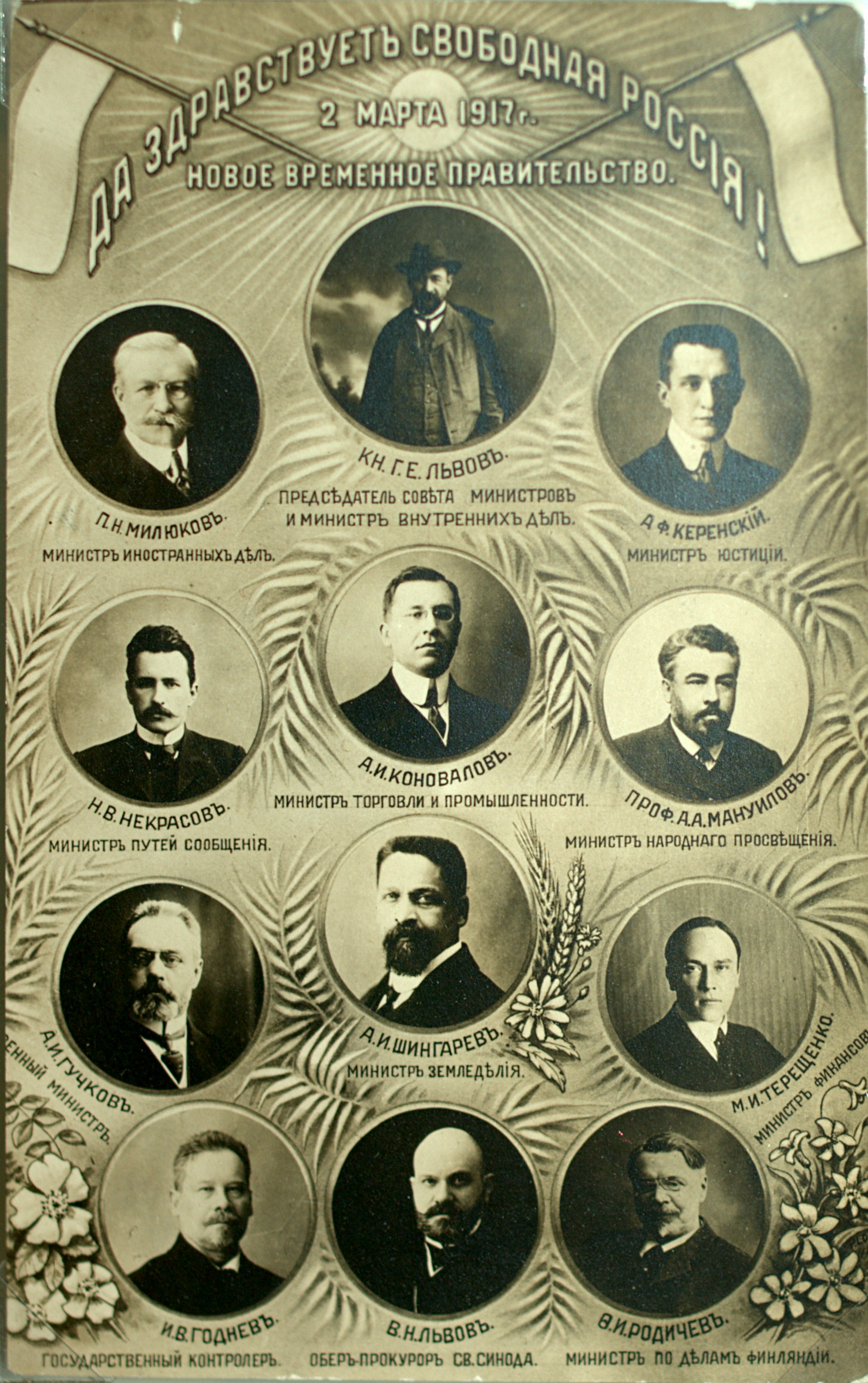
The Provisional Government in 1917

Back in London, he describes a pro-Russia meeting at Speakers Corner in Hyde Park. Shelley defended free labour unions. He worked as an interpreter at the Paris Peace Conference (1919). In 1921 he was contracted by the International Federation of Trade Unions in Switzerland.

But perhaps the most impressive piece of evidence concerning the supremacy of the Jew in the Russian Revolution is that furnished in a report drawn up by Mr. Gerard Shelley, an Englishman who was present in Russia in 1918. The Russian Anarchists, he points out, are entirely distinct from the Bolsheviks, and in their individualism, which rims to extraordinary extremes, have much more in common with the Slav temperament than with the highly concentrated system of government associated with Trotsky and his brethren. These Anarchists took a number of buildings, both in Moscow and Petrograd, which they used for teaching and other purposes. Their principal lecturer was the well-known Anarchist, Lev Chernyi, and Mr. Shelley attended a series of lectures delivered by him in the Officers' Economic Society in Moscow in April 1918. These lectures caused tremendous excitement, particularly the last of them, in which the lecturer dealt with the Bolsheviks. He pointed out that Marxism, on which Bolshevism is founded, really did not express the political side of the Russian character, and that the Bolsheviks were not sincere Socialists or Communists, but Jews, working for the ulterior motives of Judaism.

=== After WWII ===
In 1943 founded in New York a Society of Our Lady of Port Royal, which propagated the traditions of Jansenism. During World War II, Shelley translated poems by Aleksandr Pushkin, Mikhail Lermontov, Boris Pasternak and Alexander Blok.

After 1952 he spent some time in America, where the Old Catholic influence was much stronger than in the UK. He corresponded with the Catholic Australian authors Martin Boyd and Desmond O'Grady; when he became the Archbishop of Caer-Glow, the Primate of the Old Catholic Church in England and America. In 1959 Shelley's ORCC opposed the Dogma of Papal Infallibility. In 1960 he consecrated Paget King, but in the year after he regretted this. Shelley became resident in Rome from 1962 till 1965? During and after the time of Vatican II, Archbishop Shelley began to see a continued purpose in resisting the runaway changes of Catholic liberalism. Under the guidance of Shelley, the Order of Saint John of Jerusalem produced a brochure entitled "An Account of the Old Roman Catholic Church" in 1964. In 1964, five independent sects derived their apostolic succession through Arnold Mathew. Except for the Liberal Catholic Church, the "sects hardly counted numerically at all." Shelley was excommunicated on 7 April 1965.

It seems he functioned as Chairman of the OSJ Ecclesiastical Committee at least as late as April 1969. After 1977 Archbishop Shelley was largely inactive due to advanced age. It is not known if he ever married, although the Old Catholic church allows it to priests.

He was not related to the poet Percy Bysshe Shelley.

Ordination history of Gerard Shelley
History
Episcopal consecration
- Consecrated by: Richard Arthur Marchenna
Episcopal succession
Bishops consecrated by Gerard Shelley as principal consecrator
- Geoffrey Peter Thomas Paget King: June 5, 1960
- Frederick Linale: June 29, 1969
- John Joseph Humphreys: May 24, 1975

== Works ==
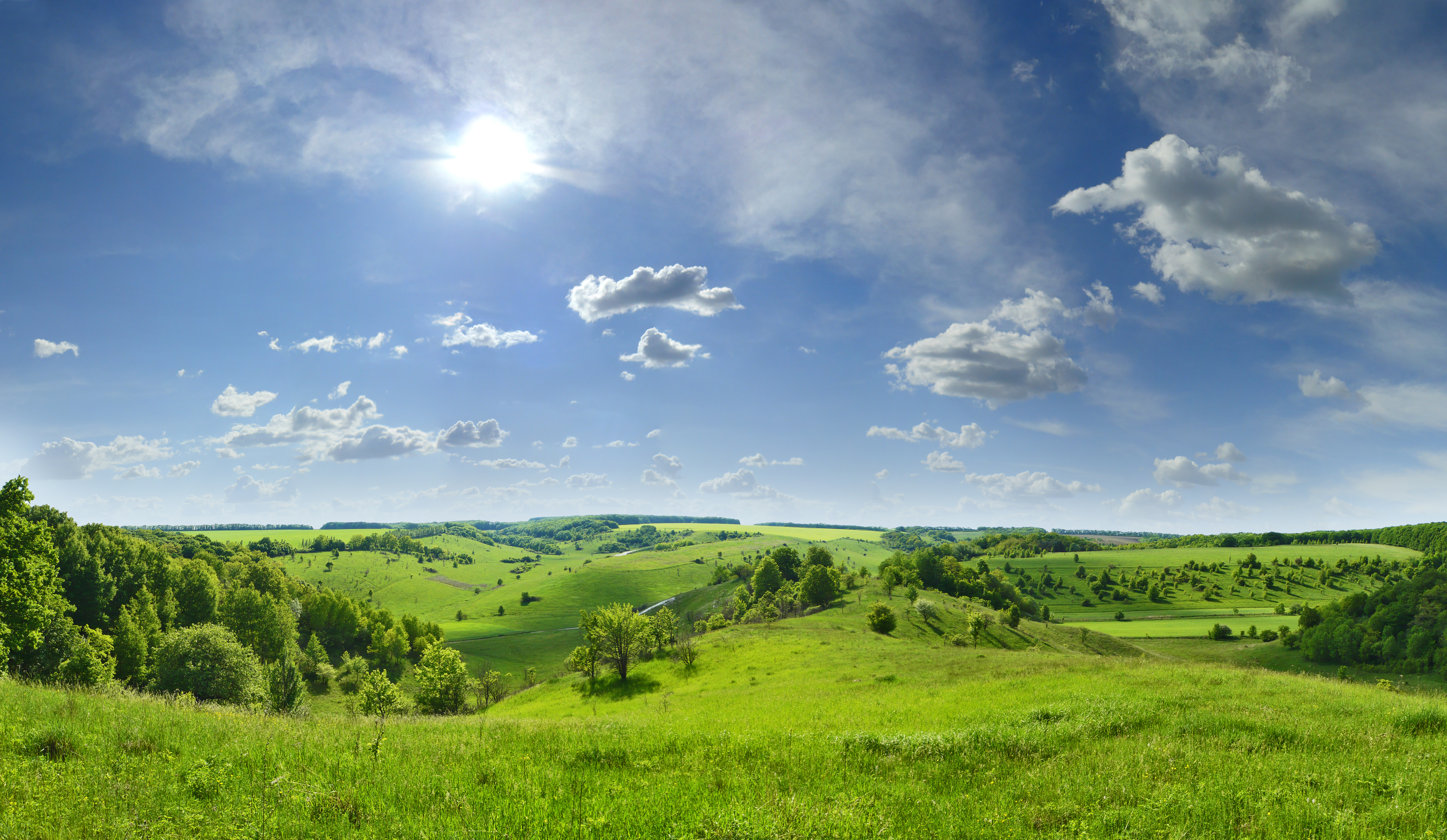
Landscape near Belgorod, photo by Vladimir Lobachyov

- The trail of the Amazons. London [1924]
- The Speckled Domes. Episodes of an Englishman's life in Russia. [With plates, including a portrait.]. London Duckworth [1925]
- The Blue Steppes: Adventures among Russians. London J. Hamilton [1925].
- The beautiful Scythian. London: John Hamilton [1926]
- Gala Knights [1926]
- The white villa at Dinard. London Gay and Hancock [1927].
- The Enchanted Dawn. Poems by Gerard Shelley [1928]

== Translations ==
- The memoirs of Mme Elizabeth Louise Vigée-Le Brun, 1755–1789. London Hamilton [1927]; New York George H. Doran Company Publishers [1927].
- "History of the Expedition to Russia, Undertaken by the Emperor Napoleon in the Year 1812". The memoirs and anecdotes of the Count de Ségur. Sundial ed. London. [1928]
- The Memoirs of the Duchess of Abrantès, 1830. With an introduction by Louis Loviot. [With plates, including portraits.]. London Jamie Hamilton [1929]
- The Demon by Mikhail Lermontov. With an introduction by Prince Mirsky. London Richards Press [1930]
- Hell in the Foreign legion by Ernst Friedrich Löhndorff. London G. Allen & Unwin Ltd. [1931]; New York Greenberg [1932].
- The Emerald Way by Eugène Demolder. London Jamie Hamilton [1931]
- The Third Oecumenical Council and the Primacy of the Bishop of Rome. A reply to the encyclical "Lux Veritatis" of Pius XI. By Archbishop of Athens and All Greece Chrysostomos Papadopoulos. London Faith Press [1933]
- Songs from the Russian Cabaret. Translated and arranged by G. Shelley. London : Cary & Co [1936]
- Modern poems from Russia. London Allen & Unwin [1941/2]; Westport, Conn Greenwood Press [1977]. ISBN 0-8371-9708-2
- Russia at War by Ilya Erenburg; authorized translation from the Russian by Gerard Shelley; with an introduction by J.B. Priestley. London Hamish Hamilton [1943]
- Four Soviet war plays.--The front, by Oleksandr Korniychuk.--Invasion, by Leonid Leonov.--The Russians, by Konstantin Simonov. Guerillas of the Ukrainian steppes, by Oleksandr Korniychuk
- The fall of Paris by Ilya Ehrenburg. London Hutchinson [1942/5]; New York [1943]; London May Fair Books [1962].
- Before the storm: recollections by I.M. Maisky. London, New York, Melbourne. Hutchinson & co. ltd., [1944]
- The Hunter of the Pamirs. A novel of adventure in Soviet Central Asia by Georgi Tushkan. London Hutchinson & Co. [1944]
- Old England by Evgeny Lann [1945]
- Folk tales of the peoples of the Soviet Union by Gerard Shelley [1945]
- Three Colours of Time. A novel of the life of Stendhal by Anatoli Vinogradov. London Hutchinson & Co. 1946
