= Ghost of You and Me =

2001 single by BBMak

Single by BBMak

from the album Sooner or Later
- Released: 19 March 2001
- Length: 4:46
- Label: Hollywood
- Songwriters: Jon Lind; Richard Page
- Producers: Rob Cavallo; Jon Lind

BBMak singles chronology
"Still on Your Side" (2000)	"Ghost of You and Me" (2001)	"Out Of My Heart (Into Your Head)" (2002)

Music video
- "Ghost of You and Me" on YouTube

"Ghost of You and Me" is a song by British pop band BBMak. It was written by Jon Lind and Richard Page (former vocalist of Mr. Mister) and appears on BBMak's debut studio album, Sooner or Later. The song was released only in the United States, being serviced to radio on 19 March 2001. The song peaked at number eight on the US Billboard Adult Contemporary chart and number 10 on the Billboard Bubbling Under Hot 100 Singles chart.

== Background ==
"Ghost of You and Me" was originally recorded by Curtis Stigers for his 1995 album Time Was. Jon Lind played the demo for BBMak member Mark Barry when the band was recording in Los Angeles. Barry brought the demo to his band mates and they agreed to record it, with Barry saying, "When we recorded it we were so pleased at how it turned out to be. We had a full orchestra on the track. It sounds big, its a big epic ballad. It's one of those songs you know when you hear it you fall in love with it. So from our reaction as well we were very confident it would be hit".

== Music and lyrics ==
The song is a ballad and has a tempo of 200 beats per minute. Chuck Taylor of Billboard wrote the song has "a vivid lyric characterizing one's reluctance to give up on a loved one, alongside a bounty of percussive brush strokes, piano, a guitar, and even a weeping cello".

== Music video ==
The music video was directed by Nigel Dick and shot in Puerto Rico. Mark Barry, Christian Burns, and Stephen McNally sing and play guitar on the beach and walk through the streets. They are each haunted by visions of their respective ex-lovers. Later, the men sing on an outdoor stage, flanked by violin players. The women in the visions multiply into many more "ghosts", and a final aerial shot shows the group of women walking on the island, wearing white and carrying candles. The video became a mainstay on the MTV show Total Request Live.

== Charts ==
=== Weekly charts ===
Chart (2001)	Peak position
US Bubbling Under Hot 100 (Billboard)	10
US Adult Contemporary (Billboard)	8
US Pop Airplay (Billboard)	28

=== Year-end charts ===
Chart (2001)	Position
US Adult Contemporary (Billboard)	24
