= The Farmer and the Viper =

One of Aesop's Fables

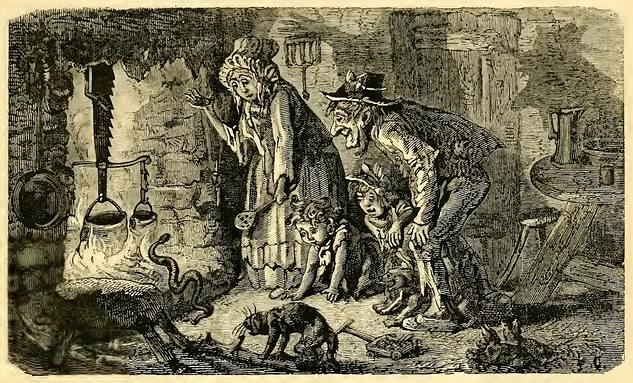
The family welcomes the frozen snake, a woodcut by Ernest Griset

The Farmer and the Viper is one of Aesop's Fables, numbered 176 in the Perry Index. It has the moral that kindness to evil will be met by betrayal and is the source of the idiom "to nourish a viper in one's bosom". The fable is not to be confused with The Snake and the Farmer, which looks back to a situation when friendship was possible between the two.

== The story ==
The story concerns a farmer who finds a viper freezing in the snow. Taking pity on it, he picks it up and places it within his coat. The viper, revived by the warmth, bites his rescuer, who dies realizing that it is his own fault. The story is recorded in both Greek and Latin sources. In the former, the farmer dies reproaching himself "for pitying a scoundrel", while in the version by Phaedrus the snake says that he bit his benefactor "to teach the lesson not to expect a reward from the wicked." The latter sentiment is made the moral in Medieval versions of the fable. Odo of Cheriton's snake answers the farmer's demand for an explanation with a counter-question, "Did you not know that there is enmity and natural antipathy between your kind and mine? Did you not know that a serpent in the bosom, a mouse in a bag and fire in a barn give their hosts an ill reward?" In modern times the fable has been applied in the religious sphere to teach that if one participates in unrighteous activities one is not immune to harm.

Aesop's fable was so widespread in Classical times that allusions to it became proverbial. One of the very earliest is in a poem by the 6th century BCE Greek poet Theognis of Megara, who refers to a friend who has betrayed him as the 'chill and wily snake that I cherished in my bosom'. In the work of Cicero it appears as In sinu viperam habere (to have a snake in the breast) and in Erasmus' 16th century collection of proverbial phrases, the Adagia, as Colubrum in sinu fovere (to nourish a serpent in one's bosom). The usual English form is 'to cherish a viper in one's bosom'.

== Variations on a theme ==
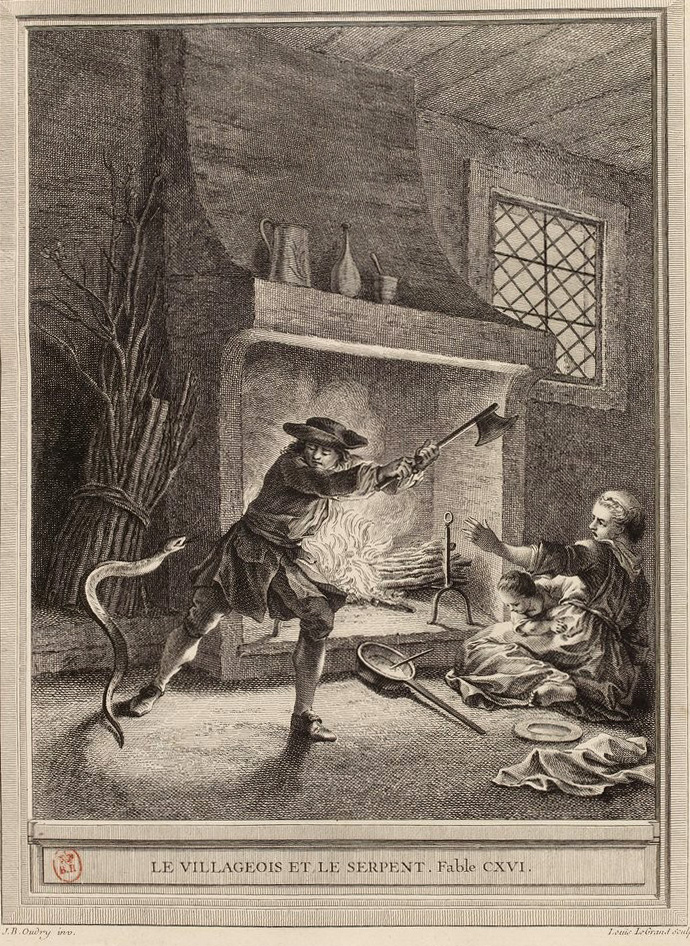
Jean-Baptiste Oudry's 1755 engraving of the fable's violent outcome

In one of the fable's alternative versions, the farmer takes the snake home to revive it and is bitten there. Eustache Deschamps told it this way in a moral ballade dating from the end of the 14th century in which the repeated refrain is "Evil for good is often the return." William Caxton amplified this version by having the snake threaten the farmer's wife and then strangle the farmer when he tried to intervene. In still another variation, the farmer kills the snake with an axe when it threatens his wife and children. La Fontaine tells it thus as "Le villageois et le serpent" (VI.13).

The Russian fabulist Ivan Krylov, who often used La Fontaine's fables for a variation of his own, adapted the story to address contemporary circumstances in his "The Peasant & The Snake". Written at a time when many Russian families were employing French prisoners from Napoleon I's invasion of 1812 to educate their children, he expressed his distrust of the defeated enemy. In his fable the snake seeks sanctuary in a peasant home and pleads to be taken in as a servant. The peasant replies that he cannot take the risk, since even if it is honest about its kindness, a single kind snake will set the precedent for a hundred wicked ones to enter.

In Nathaniel Hawthorne's short story "Egotism or The Bosom-Serpent" (1843), the proverbial phrase as used in Milton's Samson Agonistes was given a new psychological twist. Samson was there alluding to cherishing the proverbial 'snake in the bosom', in that case the woman who had betrayed him. In Hawthorne's story a husband separated from his wife, but unable to forget her, becomes inturned and mentally unstable. The obsession that is killing him (and may even have taken physical form) vanishes once the couple are reconciled.

Khushwant Singh's short story "The Mark of Vishnu" (1950) adapts the situation of the fable to an Eastern background. A Brahmin priest, assured in the belief that a cobra has a godly nature and will never harm others if treated courteously, is nevertheless killed by the snake when trying to heal and feed it. It also links with an ancient Indian analogue of the fable found in the Buddhist Veluka Jataka. There a hermit cherishes a young viper, keeping it in the joint of a bamboo (despite being warned by his teacher that "a viper can never be trusted"), and is eventually killed by its poisonous bite.

It was also the same scepticism about relationships that Oscar Brown Jr. emphasised in the song he based on the fable called The Snake, first released in 1963.

== See also ==
- The Scorpion and the Frog
- Suicidal empathy
