= Geoffrey Peter Thomas Paget King =

- In office: 1963–1991
- Predecessor: Gerard Shelley
- Successor: Dennis St Pierre

Orders
- Ordination: 18 May 1947 by Archbishop Bernard Mary Williams
- Consecration: 5 June 1960 by Gerard Shelley

Personal details
- Born: 25 May 1917 Haslington
- Died: 24 January 1991 (aged 73) London
- Denomination: Old Roman Catholic Church

Geoffrey Peter Thomas Paget King (1917–1991) was Archbishop of the Old Roman Catholic Church in Great Britain. He was raised an Anglican but joined the church in 1943. He was ordained a deacon and priest in May 1947 by Archbishop Bernard Mary Williams. On 5 June 1960 he was consecrated by Archbishop Gerard Shelley assisted by Bishop Willibrord (Hans Heuer). He continued in this role and issued new Constitutions in February 1962. Archbishops Shelley and Marchenna did not ascent to the Constitutions. This, combined with Shelley's being resident in Rome caused a breach between the two. Archbishop King continued and became Archbishop of the Church. On Easter, 1965 Archbishop King combined his jurisdiction with that of Archbishop Wilfrid Barrington-Evans and King remained as Archbishop. He continued in this role until his death in 1991.
