= Slim's Shout =

Studio album by Sunnyland Slim
- Released: 1961
- Recorded: September 15, 1960
- Studio: Van Gelder Studio, Englewood Cliffs, NJ
- Genre: Blues
- Length: 40:54 CD reissue with additional tracks
- Label: Bluesville; BVLP 1016
- Producer: Ozzie Cadena

Sunnyland Slim chronology
Chicago Blues Session (1960)	Slim's Shout (1961)	I Done You Wrong (1965)

Slim's Shout is an album by blues musician Sunnyland Slim recorded in 1960 and released on the Bluesville label the following year.

== Reception ==
Professional ratings
Review scores
Source	Rating
AllMusic	4.5/5 stars
Encyclopedia of Popular Music	5/5 stars
The Penguin Guide to Blues Recordings	3/4 stars
DownBeat	4/5 stars

AllMusic reviewer Bill Dahl stated: "You wouldn't think that transporting one of Chicago's reigning piano patriarchs to Englewood Cliffs, NJ would produce such a fine album, but this 1960 set cooks from beginning to end. Sunnyland Slim's swinging New York rhythm section has no trouble following his bedrock piano, and the estimable King Curtis peels off diamond-hard tenor sax solos in the great Texas tradition that also mesh seamlessly".

DownBeat reviewer Pete Welding gave the album 4 stars. He wrote, "In short, there is nothing coy or oblique about this stuff—it hits you squarely between the eyes. If you like spontaneous, emotive down-home blues, performed with fervor and excitement, this collection is for you".

== Track listing ==
All compositions by Sunnyland Slim except where noted

1. "I'm Prison Bound" (Brownie McGhee) – 3:19
2. "Slim's Shout" (Sunnyland Slim, Ozzie Cadena) – 3:46
3. "The Devil Is a Busy Man" – 3:49
4. "Brownskin Woman" – 3:41
5. "Shake It" (Big Joe Turner) – 3:00
6. "Decoration Day" – 4:35
7. "Baby How Long" (McGhee) – 2:40
8. "Sunnyland Special" – 4:39
9. "Harlem Can't Be Heaven" – 2:15
10. "It's You Baby" – 2:23
11. "Everytime I Get to Drinking" [take 3] – 2:40 Additional track on CD reissue
12. "Tired of You Clowning" – 3:09 Additional track on CD reissue

== Personnel ==
=== Performance ===
- Sunnyland Slim – piano, vocals
- King Curtis – tenor saxophone
- Robert Banks – organ
- Leonard Gaskin – bass
- Belton Evans – drums

=== Production ===
- Ozzie Cadena – supervision
- Rudy Van Gelder – engineer
