= I've Got a Feeling (We'll Be Seeing Each Other Again) =

Single by Al Wilson

from the album I've Got a Feeling
- B-side: "Be Concerned"
- Released: 1976
- Genre: Soul, pop
- Length: 3:21
- Label: Playboy Records
- Songwriters: Carl Hampton, Homer Banks

Al Wilson singles chronology
"How's Your Love Life" (1975)	"I've Got a Feeling (We'll Be Seeing Each Other Again)" (1976)	"Baby I Want Your Body" (1976)

"I've Got a Feeling (We'll Be Seeing Each Other Again)" is a song written by Carl Hampton and Homer Banks. It was a hit for Al Wilson in 1976.

== Background ==
The single was released on Playboy Records in 1976. It was written by Carl Hampton and Homer Banks, and produced by Marc Gordon and arranged by H.B. Barnum. The B-side "Be Concerned" was written by Herbert Santifer and produced by Ugene Dozier (Real Name: William Carl Jackson Jr.)

The record peaked at number 29 on the Billboard Hot 100 on May 15, 1976. It was listed at number 8 in the Soul Brothers Top 20, in the April 22, 1976 issue of Jet magazine. In Canada it reached No. 63.

== In literature ==
The song is mentioned in My Breaking Point, God's Turning Point: Experience God's Amazing Power to Restore by Ricky Texada. The author recounts hearing the song on the radio in the summer of 1976 and singing it over and over, especially after meeting a young lady with big brown eyes.
