= La La Peace Song =

Composition by Johnny Bristol and Elizabeth Martin

"La La Peace Song" is a song written by Johnny Bristol and Elizabeth Martin that was a hit for both Al Wilson and O. C. Smith in 1974. Both singers released albums with that name in 1974.

== Background ==
=== About the content ===
The song is an anti-war and peace song. The lyrics speak of a profound sound that passes over the heads of children, sounds of thunder but no rain and the kind of thunder that blows down doors, walls and things. The song tells of steel birds falling to the ground. It also mentions injustice, racial injustice dividing men and allowing their hate to grow. It came out at a period of time when the pop charts saw a decrease in the display of anti-war feeling. The R&B charts were a bit different and there was still the indication of anti-war feeling in the songs. "There Will Never Be Any Peace Until God Is Seated At The Conference Table" by The Chi-Lites and "La La Peace Song" showed the increasingly strong vocal feeling".

=== From composition to release ===
The song was written by Johnny Bristol and Elizabeth Martin. O. C. Smith’s version was released on Columbia 4-45863 in 1973 and then later on Columbia 3-10031 in 1974. Wilson’s version was released on Rocky Road 30,200 in 1974. Bristol produced both versions.

According to Steve Popovich of Columbia Records, Columbia re-released O. C. Smith's version a month before the Bell version by Al Wilson. However, the spokesman for Bell Records said that they thought Columbia were not pushing the song anymore, and so thinking Wilson could have a hit with it, they had him cut the song. It wasn't until they were re-mixing the song that they learnt Columbia had re-released the original O.C. Smith version.

By September 28, 1974, both Wilson's and Smith's singles had each spent a week in the Soul Singles chart. Smith's single peaked at #90 while Wilson's was at #96. In the DUPLICATE RECORDS: PROBLEM article that appeared in the October 12, 1974 issue of Billboard, Eliot Tiegel remarked that it was fascinating to see two versions of "La La Peace Song" and some others at the time in the current market with "La La Peace Song" pitting Al Wilson on Bell against O.C. Smith on Columbia. The Wilson version at that time was at 82 and Smith was at 71. Because both Al Wilson and O.C. Smith recorded the song and released it at a similar time, sales suffered.

=== Later years ===
It was announced in 2015 that the song was to be used in The Peace Project, produced by Rick Gianatos. The song was to be recorded with lead vocals by sisters Pam & Joyce Vincent and Jim Gilstrap. The song was to be used to address the problem violence in the world.

== Al Wilson ==
"La La Peace Song"

Single by Al Wilson

from the album La La Peace Song
- A-side: "La La Peace Song"
- B-side: "Keep On Loving You"
- Released: 1974
- Genre: R&B
- Length: 3:24
- Label: Rocky Road 30,200
- Songwriters: Johnny Bristol, L. Martin
- Producer: Johnny Bristol

Al Wilson singles chronology
"Touch And Go" (1974)	"La La Peace Song" (1974)	"I Won't Last A Day Without You" (1974)

Wilson's version of "La La Peace Song" was cut around June or July 1974. At the same session, Al Wilson also cut the Hall & Oates song, "She's Gone" which was intended to be the single released from those sessions. Things didn't go according to plan so the song was given to Lou Rawls and the next single that Wilson released was "La La Peace Song". According to the spokesman for Bell Records, they thought that Wilson could have a hit with "La La Peace Song" so that's why it was cut.

By September 14, 1974, on the Billboards's Top Single Picks page, Wilson's version was in the recommended category of the soul section. By October 5, 1974, Al Wilson's version had entered the Billboard HOT 100 chart at 94. By November 9, 1974, Al Wilson's album of the same name had gone from 183 to 178 and was at its 4th week in the Billboard LP Chart. By November 16, it was at its seventh week in the chart and had climbed from No. 38 to No. 30.

=== Releases ===
List
Title	Label, cat	Year	Country
"La La Peace Song" / "Keep On Loving You"	Rocky Road 30,200	1974	US
"La La Peace Song" / "Keep On Loving You"	Bell BELL 1389	1974	UK
"La La Peace Song" / "Keep On Loving You"	Bell RR 30200X	1974	Canada
"La La Peace Song" / "A Stones Throw"	Polydor 2001 546	1974	New Zealand
"La La Peace Song" / "Keep On Loving You"	Polydor 2001 546	1974	Germany

== O.C. Smith ==
"La La Peace Song"

Single by O. C. Smith

from the album La La Peace Song
- A-side: "La La Peace Song"
- B-side: "When Morning Comes"
- Released: 1973; 1974
- Genre: R&B
- Length: 3:27
- Label: Columbia 4-45863; Columbia 3-10031
- Songwriters: J. Bristol, L. Martin
- Producer: Johnny Bristol

O. C. Smith singles chronology
"La La Peace Song" (1973)	"La La Peace Song" (1973)	"La La Peace Song" (1975)

Smith's version was first released on Columbia 45863 in the summer of 1973 and it was not pushed by Columbia. It took the release of Al Wilson's version to get Columbia to re-release it on Columbia 10031. By September 28, on page 76, it showed Smith's version had entered the Billboard HOT 100 chart at 91. Instead of the song being written in as "La La Peace Song, Billboard had written the song as "La La Song". On the previous page no 75, there was a full-page ad for Al Wilson announcing that he had a smash hit with a song that is so right for the world and that it was produced by Johnny Bristol. And a small section for the ad showed his album of the same name. By November 9, 1974, at its seventh week, Smith's version of the song had gone from 62 to 100.

In Canada, the song was doing well in Montreal discotheques as reported by RPM Weekly in the November 9 issue. While radio play for it wasn't as good for the song as it was in the discotheques, it was noted how they could influence radio play. The article also mentioned that Smith's version was getting stiff competition from the Al Wilson release.

In January 1975, Billboard listed Smith's version as one of the "Top 50 Disco Hits Of ’74".

Smith re-recorded the song and it appeared on his 1986 album "What'cha Gonna Do" as "La La Peace Song ('86)".

=== Releases ===
List
Title	Label, cat	Year	Country
"La La Peace Song" / "When Morning Comes" "La La Peace Song" / "When Morning Comes"	Columbia 4-45863; Columbia 3-10031	1973; 1974	US
"La La Peace Song" / "When Morning Comes"	CBS S CBS 2221	1974	UK
"La La Peace Song" / "When Morning Comes"	Columbia 3-10031	1974	Canada
"La La Peace Song" / "When Morning Comes"	CBS BA 461558	1974	New Zealand
"La La Peace Song" / "When Morning Comes"	CBS CBS 2738	1974	Germany

== Other versions ==
Randolph Rose recorded a German version of the song, titled "La La Love Song" which was released in Germany on single in 1975. Cover Boys did a version of the song along with another Johnny Bristol composition, "Hang On In There Baby", which was released on Sizzle Records, Unidisc in 1987. A version by Donato was released on the Miami-based Vision record label. Mari Wilson recorded a version which appeared on her 1991 The Rhythm Romance album.

== Charts ==
Al Wilson version
Chart (1974)	Peak position
Canada	45
Billboard Hot 100	62

O. C. Smith version
Chart (1974)	Peak position
Canada	49
Billboard Hot 100	30

== See also ==
- List of anti-war songs
