= Show and Tell (song) =

"Show And Tell"

Single by Al Wilson

from the album Show and Tell
- B-side: "Listen to Me"
- Released: August 1973
- Recorded: 1973
- Genre: Soul; pop
- Length: 3:30
- Label: Rocky Road
- Songwriter: Jerry Fuller

Al Wilson singles chronology
| "Lodi" (1969) | "Show And Tell" (1973) | "Touch and Go" (1974) |

"Show and Tell" is a popular song written by Jerry Fuller and first recorded by Johnny Mathis in 1972. This original version made it to #36 on the Easy Listening chart.

== Al Wilson version ==
A 1973 recording of the song by Al Wilson reached #1 on the Billboard Hot 100 the week of January 19, 1974. It sold over two million copies and was named a Cash Box #1 Single of the Year. Billboard ranked it as the #15 song for 1974. Wilson's version also made #10 on the Hot Soul Singles chart.

For this version of the song, songwriter Jerry Fuller credits bassist Dennis Parker for the bass line. (Note: For the Al Wilson version of the song AllMusic credits the bass performance to bassist James Jamerson; however other sources, including the songwriter Jerry Fuller, credit bassist Dennis Parker.) Parker reported that bandleader-arranger H. B. Barnum devised the bass line for the song's introduction.

=== Chart history ===
==== Weekly charts ====
| Chart (1973–1974) | Peak position |
|---|---|
| Australia (Kent Music Report) | 57 |
| Canada RPM Top Singles | 7 |
| Canada RPM Adult Contemporary | 21 |
| U.S. Billboard Hot 100 | 1 |
| U.S. Billboard Easy Listening | 3 |
| U.S. Billboard Hot Soul Singles | 10 |
| U.S. Cash Box Top 100 | 1 |

==== Year-end charts ====
| Chart (1974) | Position |
|---|---|
| Canada | 58 |
| U.S. Billboard Hot 100 | 15 |
| U.S. Billboard Easy Listening | 28 |
| U.S. Cash Box | 1 |

== Other cover versions ==
- Engelbert Humperdinck in 1974 on his album My Love.
- Peabo Bryson had a #1 R&B hit with it in 1989. Bryson's rendition did not chart on the Hot 100.
- American singer/actress Vanessa Williams for her 2005 studio album Everlasting Love.

== In popular culture ==
- The song was often played by Paul Shaffer and The CBS Orchestra on the Late Show with David Letterman for the segment "Show & Tell".
- Wilson's version can be heard on TV show Malcolm in the Middle's episode "Forbidden Girlfriend".
