= Robert Banks (musician) =

American pianist, organist and composer

Rob Banks
- Born: February 3, 1930 (age 96)
- Instrument: Keyboards
- Labels: Glowhill, Altone

Rob Banks (born February 3, 1930) is an American pianist, organist and composer. The artists he has worked with include Solomon Burke and Lu Elliott.

== Background ==
Banks was discovered by Horace Sims, a guitarist who took him on the road with his band El Tempo.

== Career ==
=== 1950s ===
In 1954, his recording of "Mambo Blues" appeared on the B side of a Johnny Otis Orchestra single "Mambo Boogie". It was released on the Savoy label. In 1956, the Robert Banks Trio did a cover of the Glenn Miller theme, "Moonlight Serenade", released on the Regent label. In October 1957, banks and Hal Rollins recorded some tracks for Newark's Glowhill label. The single that Banks recorded was "On The Street Where You Live" which was backed with "Destination", a frenzied type of instrumental.

=== 1960s ===
During the 1960s, he worked with Solomon Burke. He also arranged and conducted both sides of the Willie Hightower single For "Sentimental Reasons" / "You Send Me", released on Capitol.

Banks arranged the song "Help Me" that was released on Wand Records WND 1135 in 1966. It was credited to a singer by the name of Al Wilson. But the singer is not the same Al Wilson who recorded "The Snake".

=== 1970s ===
He produced the Myrna Summers & The Interdenominational Singers Tell It Like It Is album that was released by 1970.

=== 1980s ===
In 1981, he was part of a duo consisting of himself on piano and bassist Jimmy Lewis, backing singer Lu Elliott at The Cookery at East Eighth Street at University Place in New York.

== Rob Banks discography ==
=== Singles ===
- "Moonlight Serenade" / "Sentimental Journey" - Regent 7501 - (1956)
- "Smile" / "A Mighty Good Way" - Verve VK-10545 - (1967)

=== Albums ===
Record LP

- The Message - Verve V-5016 - (1967)

8-Track Cartridge

- Rob Banks - Theme from the Godfather - Altone 1973
- Rob Banks, Soulmate Singers - Theme from Isaac Hayes' Shaft (Shaft/Jesus Christ Superstar) - Altone 1974

== Other discography ==
With Mildred Anderson

- No More in Life (Bluesville, 1961)

With the Johnny Otis Orchestra featuring Goucho and His Jungle Drums

- "Mambo Boogie" / Rob Banks And The Waileros - "Mambo Blues" - Savoy 45-1132 - (1954)

With Shakey Jake

- Mouth Harp Blues (Bluesville, 1961)

With Curtis Jones

- Trouble Blues (Bluesville, 1960)

With Sunnyland Slim

- Slim's Shout (Bluesville, 1961)

With Al Smith

- Midnight Special (Bluesville, 1961)

With Roosevelt Sykes

- The Honeydripper (Bluesville, 1961)
