= Sooner or Later (BBMak album) =

Studio album by BBMak
- Released: 16 May 2000 (US); 28 May 2001 (UK)
- Studio: United Recording
- Genre: Pop; pop rock; teen pop
- Length: 44:10 (US release)
- Label: Hollywood, Telstar
- Producer: Rob Cavallo; John Shanks; Oliver Leiber; Pro-Jay; Robin Thicke

BBMak chronology
Sooner or Later (2000)	Into Your Head (2002)

Singles from Sooner or Later
- 1. "Back Here" Released: 9 August 1999; 2. "Still on Your Side" Released: 14 May 2001; 3. "Ghost of You and Me" Released: 17 July 2001

Professional ratings
Review scores
Source	Rating
AllMusic	4/5 stars
Entertainment Weekly	B−
NME	1/10 stars
Plugged In (publication)	(average)
Robert Christgau	(Honourable mention)

Sooner or Later is the debut studio album by English pop group BBMak, released on 16 May 2000 through Telstar and Hollywood Records. It was re-released in the United Kingdom the following year, peaking at number 16 in the UK charts. The album peaked at number 38 on the US Billboard 200, producing three hit singles, and was certified gold.

== Track listing ==
No.	Title	Writer(s)	Producer(s)	Length
1.	"Back Here"	Mark Barry; Christian Burns; Stephen McNally; Phil Thornalley	Oliver Leiber; John Shanks	3:35
2.	"I'm Not in Love"	Leiber; Jon Lind	Leiber	4:14
3.	"Next Time"	Leiber; Paul Peterson; Shanks	Leiber	3:51
4.	"Unpredictable"	Leiber; Peterson; Anthony Kavanaugh	Leiber; Rob Cavallo	4:24
5.	"Ghost of You and Me"	Lind; Richard Page	Cavallo; Lind (assoc.)	4:46
6.	"I Can Tell"	Robin Thicke; James Gass	Thicke; Pro-Jay; Cavallo (add.); Lind (add.)	3:39
7.	"Love Is Leaving"	Barry; Burns; McNally	Cavallo; Lind (assoc.)	4:18
8.	"Love on the Outside"	Barry; Burns; McNally	Cavallo; Lind; BBMak	2:47
9.	"Still on Your Side"	Bridget Benenate; Bob Thiele; Dillon O'Brian; Barry; Burns; McNally	O'Brian; Thiele; Cavallo (add.); Lind (add.)	3:52
10.	"Always"	Barry; Burns; McNally	Cavallo; Lind; BBMak	1:06
11.	"Can't Say"	Barry; Burns; McNally; Thornalley; David Munday	Lieber	3:38
12.	"Again"	Burns; Barry; McNally	Mark Jolley; Richard Cardwell; Milton McDonald; BBMak; Cavallo (add.)	3:35

== Singles ==
- "Back Here" – UK CD 2 August 16, 1999; US April 11, 2000; UK CD 1 February 12, 2001 (TRL 06.16.00)
- "Still On Your Side" – US July 17, 2001; UK May 14, 2001 (TRL 11.27.00)
- "Ghost of You and Me" – (TRL Debut 05.11.01)

== Track listing (Original Asia release) ==
Released in Winter 1999. Victor Entertainment, Inc. Cat No. VICP-60913

1. "Back Here"
2. "Still on Your Side"
3. "Next Time"
4. "I Can Tell"
5. "Again"
6. "Can't Say"
7. "Miss You More"
8. "Emily's Song"
9. "September"
10. "Sooner or Later"
11. "More Than Words"

== Charts ==
=== Weekly charts ===
Chart (2000–01)	Peak position
Japanese Albums (Oricon)	57
Scottish Albums (OCC)	14
UK Albums (OCC)	16
US Billboard 200	38
US Heatseekers Albums (Billboard)	1

=== Year-end charts ===
Chart (2000)	Position
US Billboard 200	182

== Certifications ==
Region	Certification	Certified units/sales
United States (RIAA)	Gold	500,000^{^}
^{^} Shipments figures based on certification alone.

== Production (Asia Release) ==
- Track 1 – John Shanks, Oliver Leiber
- Track 2 – Bob Thiele Jr., Dillon O'Brian
- Track 3 – Oliver Leiber
- Track 4 – Pro-Jay, Robin Thicke
- Track 6 – Mark Jolley, Richard Cardwell, Milton McDonald
- Track 11 – Darren Allison
