= Powerstation =

Studio album by BBMak
- Released: 11 October 2019
- Genre: Pop rock
- Length: 35:26
- Label: Triple Jet Music; Topanga Creek Records

BBMak chronology
Into Your Head (2002)	Powerstation (2019)

Singles from Powerstation
- 1. "Bullet Train" Released: 3 May 2019; 2. "So Far Away" Released: 16 August 2019; 3. "Uncivil War" Released: 20 September 2019; 4. "Wolves" Released: 2 December 2019

Powerstation is the third studio album by the English music group BBMak, released on 11 October 2019 by Triple Jet Music and Topanga Creek Records.

== Background ==
On 29 March 2018 Christian Burns confirmed that the band had reunited. On 1 April 2018 the group uploaded a video to Facebook of a performance of their first single, "Back Here". Mark Barry also confirmed that the band is going out on a worldwide tour and is getting back in the studio later this year to work on a new pop rock album. On 17 December 2018 the band announced that their next album would be released on 26 April 2019, and that their first single would be released on February. A tour that same year would follow. The album's release date was then pushed back to August 2019, with their first single for the album, "Bullet Train", initially slated for release on 26 April before being postponed to 3 May. On 28 May 2019 the tracklist for Powerstation was revealed.

== Track listing ==
No.	Title	Length
1.	"Bullet Train"	3:31
2.	"So Far Away"	3:37
3.	"No One Like You"	2:59
4.	"Uncivil War"	3:58
5.	"You Don't See Me"	4:23
6.	"We Can Be Lovers"	3:40
7.	"Wolves"	4:25
8.	"Falling Up"	3:29
9.	"Out of Time"	3:48
10.	"Powerstation"	1:36
