= Richard Arthur Marchenna =

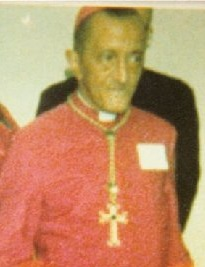
- Archbishop Marchenna
- Successor: Disputed

Orders
- Ordination: April 15, 1941 by Carmel Henry Carfora
- Consecration: April 16, 1941 by Carmel Henry Carfora

Personal details
- Born: March 17, 1904
- Died: September 2, 1982 (aged 78) Newark, New Jersey, USA

Ordination history
History
Episcopal consecration
- Consecrated by: Carmel Henry Carfora
- Date: April 16, 1941
Episcopal succession
Bishops consecrated by Richard Arthur Marchenna as principal consecrator
- Gerard George Shelley: March 25, 1950

Richard Arthur Marchenna (March 17, 1904 – September 2, 1982) was an Independent Old Catholic bishop consecrated by Carmel Henry Carfora as his suffragan bishop of Newark with delegated ordinary authority over congregations in New Jersey and New York.

Marchenna ordained Peter Paul Brennan into the priesthood. He also consecrated Robert Mary Clement into the episcopacy.
