= The Snake (song) =

Single by Al Wilson
- B-side: "Getting Ready for Tomorrow" (1968 release) "Willoughby Brook" (1975 UK release)
- Released: August 1968 (U.S.); August 8, 1975 (U.K.)
- Genre: Northern soul; R&B
- Length: 3:27
- Label: Soul City (1968 release); Bell (1975 UK release)
- Songwriter: Oscar Brown
- Producers: Johnny Rivers; Marc Gordon

Al Wilson singles chronology
"Do What You Gotta Do" (1967)	"The Snake" (1968)	"Poor Side of Town" (1968)

"The Snake" is a song written and first recorded by civil-rights activist Oscar Brown in 1963; it became a hit single for American singer Al Wilson in 1968. The song tells a story similar to Aesop's fable The Farmer and the Viper and the African American folktale "Mr. Snake and the Farmer".

The song gained renewed attention during the campaign for the 2016 United States presidential election.

== Chart history ==
In the U.S., the hit version of "The Snake" was released in 1968, on Johnny Rivers' Soul City Records. (Rivers had released his own version of the song on his 1966 album ...And I Know You Wanna Dance.) Wilson's single made the Top 30 on the Billboard Hot 100 in 1968 and, due to exposure on the UK Northern soul scene, made the UK Singles Chart in August 1975 when reissued, reaching No. 41 in September. The success of "The Snake" on the Northern soul nightclub circuit has led to it being ranked 4 of 500 top Northern soul singles and for it to appear on over 30 pop and Northern soul compilation albums. The song was re-released in 1989 as a B-side to a re-release of "Just Don't Want to Be Lonely" by The Main Ingredient. Wilson's recording of "The Snake" was also featured in a Lambrini television advertisement in the UK.

Chart (1968)	Peak position
Canada RPM Top Singles	38
U.S. Billboard Hot 100	27
U.S. Billboard R&B	32
U.S. Cash Box Top 100	32

Chart (1975)	Peak position
UK	41

== Certifications ==
Region	Certification	Certified units/sales
United Kingdom (BPI)	Silver	200,000^{‡}
^{‡} Sales+streaming figures based on certification alone.

== In popular culture ==
The song was featured in season 4, episode 25 of the television show Northern Exposure, "Old Tree". It was sung by Cynthia Geary in her role as the character Shelly Tambo. The episode originally aired on May 24, 1993.

== Use by Donald Trump ==
The song gained renewed attention during the campaign for the 2016 United States presidential election. Republican candidate Donald Trump read its lyrics at several campaign rallies to illustrate his position on refugees and illegal immigration, claiming that the decision to allow people claiming refugee status to enter the United States would "come back to bite us", as happened to the woman who took in the snake in the song. Two of Brown's seven children asked Trump to stop using their late father's song, telling the media: "He's perversely using 'The Snake' to demonize immigrants" and that Brown "never had anything against immigrants". Despite a cease and desist letter, Trump has continued reciting the lyrics at rallies including in June 2021, and in September and December 2023. At a rally in Ohio on March 16, 2024, Trump again read "The Snake", calling it "a very accurate metaphor, and it's about our border, it's about the people we have coming in, and don't be surprised when bad things happen, because bad things will happen." At a rally in Vandalia, Ohio, near Dayton, on October 3, 2026, Trump recited "The Snake" and dedicated it to Springfield, Ohio.

In 2024, The Lincoln Project, a Republican Trump opposition group, co-opted Trump's reading of the poem in an attack ad during the 2024 Republican National Convention, positing vice-presidential nominee JD Vance as the woman and Trump as the snake.

== See also ==
- The Scorpion and the Frog
- The Farmer and the Viper
