= Anthony Girandola =

Catholic priest (1924-1997)

Anthony James Girandola (September 12, 1924 – September 1, 1997) was a Catholic priest who publicly announced in the 1960s that he had been married while a priest for several years, and that he intended to remain both married and a priest. He later went on to found two separate Catholic groups in the United States.

The Catholic Church, whose laws on clerical celibacy do not usually permit priests in the Latin Church to be married, would not offer him a position in which he could perform priestly functions. Girandola began to organize his own independent church in Saint Petersburg, Florida. He became a celebrity after his announcement and was in demand as both a speaker and as a guest on radio and television talk shows. At about this time he wrote a well-known book, The Most Defiant Priest.
