= Show and Tell (Al Wilson album) =

Studio album by Al Wilson
- Released: 1973
- Recorded: 1973
- Studio: Larrabee Sound Studios, Hollywood, California
- Genre: Soul, R&B
- Label: Rocky Road Records
- Producer: Jerry Fuller

Al Wilson chronology
Weighing In (1973)	Show and Tell (1973)	La La Peace Song (1974)

Professional ratings
Review scores
Source	Rating
Allmusic	4.5/5 stars
Christgau's Record Guide	D

Show and Tell is an album by American soul singer, Al Wilson. Released in 1973, it includes the number one pop and top ten R&B hit title track, "Show and Tell". The album was arranged by H. B. Barnum with the cover photograph by Lamonte McLemore. The sleeve included the inscription, "Lovely ladies are Cisely Johnston and Carol Augustus. Thanks to Hal Blaine for the use of his 1927 Phantom I Rolls Royce".

== Track listing ==
All tracks composed by Jerry Fuller; except where indicated

1. "Show and Tell" – 3:30
2. "I'm Out to Get You" – 3:39
3. "Queen of the Ghetto" – 2:53
4. "Touch and Go" – 3:09
5. "My Song" (Charles Richard Cason) – 3:43
6. "Broken Home" (Barry Mann, Stanley Styne) – 3:43
7. "What You See" (Bradford Craig, H. B. Barnum) – 3:46
8. "Love Me Gentle, Love Me Blind" (Annette Fuller, Jerry Tawney) – 4:00
9. "Moonlightin'" - (Barnum, Fuller) – 3:40
10. "For Cryin' Out Loud" – 3:37
11. "A Song for You" (Leon Russell) – 5:42

== Charts ==
Chart (1974)	Peak position
Billboard Top LPs	70
Billboard Top Soul LPs	9

=== Singles ===
Year	Single	Chart positions	
Year	Single	US	US R&B
1974	"Show and Tell"	1	10
