= Georgii Tushkan =

Georgii Pavlovich Tushkan Георгий Павлович Тушкан
- Born: 19 February 1905 Poltava, Russian Empire
- Died: 11 March 1965 (aged 60) Moscow, Russian SFSR, Soviet Union
- Occupation: Novelist
- Genre: Adventure, science fiction

Georgii Pavlovich Tushkan (1905–1965) was a Russian novelist, specializing in adventure and science fiction.

== Personal life ==
Tushkan's father was Pavel Fedorovich Tushkan, an agronomist and a teacher. In 1926, Tushkan graduated from Uman Polytechnic, then in 1929 from Kharkov Institute of Grain Crops. Starting in 1933, he worked Pamir Mountains, conducting economic surveys for the Turksib highway and other facilities. He traveled extensively through Central Asia.

During World War II, Tushkan voluntarily enlisted in the Red Army in 1941. He was wounded several times. He worked in intelligence, searching for German missile weapons, which he described in his 1961 book Hunters for the FAA.

In the 1960s, Tushkan was chairman of the science fiction and adventure division of the Moscow Writing Organization.

== Books ==
- Blue Beach (co-authored with M.P. Loskutov) (1937)
- Jura (1940) (translated into English as The Hunter of the Pamirs, 1944)
- Green Country Scouts (1950)
- Black Tornado (1954)
- Hunters for the FAA (1961)
- Birds Fly North: Hunting and Fishing Adventures (1961)
- Friends and Enemies of Anatoly Rusakov (1963)
- First Shot (1967)
