= Jon Lind =

American songwriter and performer (1948–2022)

- Born: Jonathan Gus Lind; April 14, 1948; Brooklyn, New York, U.S.
- Died: January 15, 2022 (aged 73); Los Angeles, California, U.S.
- Occupations: Songwriter; musician
- Known for: Collaboration as a performer with Ramsey Lewis, Earth, Wind and Fire, Howdy Moon, The Fifth Avenue Band; Songwriter for Madonna, Cher and others

Jonathan Gus Lind (April 14, 1948 – January 15, 2022), professionally known as Jon Lind, was an American songwriter, performer and A&R executive.

== Biography ==
Lind was born in Brooklyn, New York on April 14, 1948, and raised in New York City. He studied classical guitar at the Mannes College of Music. His first break was in the 1970s where he worked with Bob Cavallo. During this period he met producer Maurice White who recorded his songs with Ramsey Lewis and Earth, Wind and Fire. He was also a member of the band Howdy Moon and the Fifth Avenue Band.

He wrote songs for artists such as Madonna, Cher, the Emotions, Jennifer Holliday, D.J. Rogers, Atlantic Starr and Ramsey Lewis. In 1984, Lind signed with Warner Brothers. He was a Senior Vice President of A&R at Hollywood Records. Lind died from cancer on January 15, 2022, at the age of 73.

== Compositions ==
Some songs written or co-written by Lind include:

- Howdy Moon - "Cheyenne Autumn" and "Mill Stream" (Co-written with Francine Tacker)
- Ramsey Lewis & Earth, Wind and Fire - "Sun Goddess" (Co-written with Maurice White)
- Earth, Wind and Fire with The Emotions - "Boogie Wonderland" (Co-written with Allee Willis)
- Madonna - "Crazy for You" (Co-written with John Bettis; Billboard Hot 100 #1)
- Cher - "Skin Deep" (Co-written with Mark Goldenberg)
- Cheap Trick - "No Mercy" (Co-written with Jim Scott)
- Cher - "Kiss to Kiss" (Co-written with Mary D'astugues and Phil Galdston) and "All Because of You" (Co-written with Sue Schifrin)
- The Temptations - "Big Fun (Harry Crumb)" (Co-written with Galdston and David Was)
- Jon Lind - "I'm Gonna' Be the One" (Co-written with Don Was)
- Gene Miller - "Can't Believe My Eyes" (Co-written with Bettis)
- Vanessa Williams - "Save the Best for Last" (Co-written with Wendy Waldman and Phil Galdston; Billboard Hot 100 #1)
- Mica Paris - "Whisper a Prayer" (Co-written with Waldman and Galdston)
- Vanessa Williams - "The Sweetest Days" (Co-written with Waldman and Galdston)
- BBMak - "Ghost of You and Me" (Co-written with Richard Page)
- Warren Wiebe - "I Believe in Us" (Co-written with Waldman and Galdston)
- Akina Nakamori - "Heartbreak", "Femme Fatale" from the studio album Femme Fatale (Oricon Albums Chart #1)

== Discography ==
=== The Fifth Avenue Band ===
- The Fifth Avenue Band (Reprise 6369 - 1969)

Side 1

1. "Fast Freight" (Peter Gallway)
2. "One Way or the Other" (Kenny Altman)
3. "Good Lady of Toronto" (Peter Gallway)
4. "Eden Rock" (Kenny Altman - Peter Gallway)
5. "Country Time Rhymes" (Peter Gallway)
6. "Calamity Jane" (Peter Gallway)

Side 2

1. "Nice Folks" (Kenny Altman)
2. "Cockeyed Shame" (Peter Gallway)
3. "Faithful Be Fair" (Kenny Altman)
4. "In Hollywood" (Peter Gallway)
5. "Angel" (Jon Lind)
- The Fifth Avenue Band - Really (Pony Canyon, Japan, 1990)

=== Howdy Moon ===
- Howdy Moon (A&M 1974)

=== White Horse ===
- White Horse (Capitol 1977)
