= Lambrini =

British alcoholic beverage

Lambrini is a light and fruity perry (pear cider) created by Halewood Artisanal Spirits in 1994. It has been owned by Accolade Wines since June 2021. Lambrini dominates the British perry market, with a 53.6% market share in the off trade in 2015.

== Products ==
Lambrini has been produced in Original (6% ABV), Luci (3.5% ABV), previously Lambrini Light, and Cherry, Peach and Strawberry flavours (all 5% ABV). As of 2025, Luci and Peach were not on the market. A 2009 study on alcohol sold in supermarkets and off-licences in North East England identified Lambrini as the cheapest alcohol in the wine category, measured on the price of a unit of alcohol. It is notable that the study regarded it as a wine, even though it is technically not wine and has a significantly lower ABV than most grape wines.

Production for a bottle of Lambrini takes about six weeks. It is produced in a factory in Halewood, Huyton, Merseyside.

Lambrini has on occasion been accused of deliberate confusion with wine and other perry manufacturers' products beginning with "Lam", such as Lambrusco. Around 2018, Lambrini's alcohol content was reduced from 7.5% to 6.8%, and, in early-2020, Lambrini reduced bottle size from 150cl to 125cl, and reduced alcohol content further to 6% ABV.

== Marketing ==
Although Lambrini is not a wine but a perry, it is a marketed more in the style of a wine than a traditional perry or cider. Its marketing is targeted at women. The Committee of Advertising Practice published a new edition of their advertising code in 2005, and the campaign for Lambrini was the first to be found non-compliant. The Advertising Standards Authority banned the ad in question for implying that the drink may bring sexual or social success.

The advertising for the product was changed in 2015 from the slogan "Lambrini girls just wanna have fun", by launching a new "Bring the Brini" marketing campaign.

== See also ==
- Babycham
