= BBMak =

British pop group

- BBMAK, 2002. L-R: Christian Burns, Mark Barry and Stephen McNally

Background information
- Origin: Liverpool, England
- Genres: Pop; pop rock; alternative
- Years active: 1996–2003; 2018–present
- Labels: Telstar; Hollywood; Triple Jet Music; Topanga Creek Records
- Members: Mark Barry; Christian Burns; Stephen McNally
- Website: bbmak.com

BBMak are a British band consisting of Mark Barry, Christian Burns and Stephen McNally. Formed in Liverpool in 1996, they sold more than three million albums worldwide between 1999 and 2003. The band first achieved success when their single "Back Here" gained popularity in radio stations in Asia and they later signed with Hollywood Records in the U.S. The band reworked their debut album Sooner or Later for an American release in 2000, and the album charted at number 38 on the Billboard 200 chart with "Back Here" becoming a top 20 hit. BBMak's success in the American market helped the band finally break through in their home country.

In 2002, the group released their second album Into Your Head which charted at number 25 on the Billboard albums chart. In 2003, the group dissolved as each member went on to pursue solo careers. BBMak reunited in 2018 after a 15-year absence. They recorded and released a third studio album, Powerstation (2019).

== Career ==
=== 1996–1998: Formation and debut ===
Christian Burns, who was raised in Wigan, learned to play rhythm guitar when he was fourteen years old. Burns's father had been a guitarist for the band The Signs, which opened for the Beatles in their early years. Stephen McNally, of Liverpool, aspired to be a guitarist and initially had no ambitions to sing. Mark Barry, of Manchester, got his musical start playing the bagpipes as a kid. The trio met each other while playing with different bands on the Northwest England music circuit and began performing as a group in 1997. McNally came up with the group's band name, which is a combination of the first letters of the band's surnames Burns, Barry, and McNally.

After the group recorded a demo, they traveled to London in the hopes of securing a record deal. The trio would sing outside the offices of major record companies. Once they generated enough industry buzz, BBMak put on a five-song, acoustic showcase in Liverpool. The show drew the attention of record label executives and sparked a bidding war for the band. The band secured a record deal with Telstar Records in the UK in 1998.

=== 1999–2001: Breakthrough and Sooner or Later ===
The group's debut single "Back Here" was initially released in August 1999 in the United Kingdom, reaching only number 37 on the UK singles chart that month. The group did not achieve breakthrough success until their debut in North America. The group performed live at Walt Disney World's Epcot park in February 2000; their performance was recorded for an episode of Disney Channel in Concert which focused on both BBMak and M2M and aired on 29 April on Disney Channel. BBMak's debut album, Sooner or Later, was released in the United States on 16 May 2000, peaking at number 38 on the Billboard 200. "Back Here" reached number 13 on the US Billboard Hot 100 chart in July 2000. "Back Here" was subsequently re-released as a single in the UK on 12 February 2001, and the single eventually climbed to No. 5 on the UK singles chart and No. 1 for 11 weeks on the US adult contemporary chart. The album would eventually go on to sell more than one million copies.

The band appeared in episodes of the ABC show All My Children in May 2000 and opened for Britney Spears on the North American leg of the Oops!... I Did It Again Tour. BBMak closed out the year with a sold out 26-date US concert tour and a live performance on MTV's Times Square New Year's Eve 2001 special. The band's next single, "Still on Your Side", was released in 2001 and reached No. 8 in the UK and No. 54 in the US, respectively. That year, BBMak released a DVD called Sooner or Later: Our First Year in America. The band released their third single, "Ghost of You and Me", on 11 May 2001; it peaked at No. 8 on the US adult contemporary chart. The band also appeared on an episode of Disney Channel series Even Stevens. BBMak continued to tour U.S. stadiums in 2001 as a supporting act for NSYNC on the PopOdyssey tour.

In July 2001, the group's track "Miss You More" was featured on the soundtrack to The Princess Diaries. In October of that year, Christian Burns' vocals were featured along with those of NSYNC's Lance Bass and Joey Fatone, Mandy Moore and True Vibe on the single "On the Line" for the film of the same name; the group's song "Don't Look Down" was also featured on the soundtrack. In 2002, the band covered the song "Always Know Where You Are" by John Rzeznik of the Goo Goo Dolls for Disney's Treasure Planet soundtrack. BBMak also covered the song "Do You Believe in Magic" for Disney's Peter Pan sequel, Return to Never Land.

=== 2002–2003: Into Your Head ===
In August 2002, BBMak released their second album titled Into Your Head. The album reached No. 25 on the Billboard 200. The first single from the album, "Out of My Heart (Into Your Head)," peaked at No. 56 on the Hot 100 chart and No. 25 on the adult contemporary chart. In 2003, the single "Staring into Space" was released in select countries. The band split amicably in 2003.

=== 2018–present: Powerstation ===
On 29 March 2018, Christian Burns confirmed that the band had reunited. On 1 April 2018, the group uploaded a video to Facebook of a performance of their first single, "Back Here". In January 2019, the band confirmed plans for a worldwide tour and a new album. After numerous delays, the first single from their new album, "Bullet Train", was released on 3 May 2019. The album, titled Powerstation, was released on 11 October 2019. In 2021, BBMak released The Lost Tapes, composed of nine B-sides.

In 2023, BBMak joined the Pop 2000 Tour hosted by *NSYNC band member Chris Kirkpatrick, which featured other best-selling acts from the 2000s including LFO, O-Town, and Ryan Cabrera. The band returned for the 2024 Pop 2000 Tour.

== Awards and nominations ==
Award	Year	Nominee(s)	Category	Result	Ref.
ASCAP Pop Music Awards	2002	"Back Here"	Most Performed Song	Won	
BMI London Awards	2004	"Out of My Heart (Into Your Head)"	Pop Award	Won	
Teen Choice Awards	2001	"Ghost of You and Me"	Choice Love Song	Nominated	

== Members ==
- Mark Barry (born on 26 October 1978 in Manchester, England) – vocals
- Christian Burns (born on 18 January 1974 in Liverpool, England) – vocals, rhythm guitar
- Stephen McNally (born on 4 July 1978 in Liverpool, England) – vocals, lead guitar

== Discography ==
=== Studio albums ===
Title	Album details	Peak chart positions		Certifications (sales threshold)
Title	Album details	UK	US	Certifications (sales threshold)
Sooner or Later	Release date: 16 May 2000 (US), 28 May 2001 (UK); Label: Telstar; Formats: CD, cassette	16	38	US: Gold
Into Your Head	Release date: 27 August 2002 (US), 18 November 2002 (UK); Label: Hollywood; Formats: CD	—	25	
Powerstation	Release date: 11 October 2019; Label: Triple Jet Music/Topanga Creek; Formats: CD, digital distribution	—	—	
"—" denotes releases that did not chart

=== Singles ===
Title	Year	Peak chart positions									Album
Title	Year	UK	AUS	CAN	IRE	NZ	US	US AC	US Adult	US Pop	Album
"Back Here"	1999	5	47	11	26	18	13	1	12	8	Sooner or Later
"Still on Your Side"	2001	8	—	—	30	—	54	—	40	14	Sooner or Later
"Ghost of You and Me"	2002	—	—	—	—	—	110	8	—	28	Sooner or Later
"Out of My Heart (Into Your Head)"	2002	36	65	22	—	19	56	25	23	20	Into Your Head
"Staring into Space"	2003	—	—	—	—	—	—	—	—	—	Into Your Head
"Back Here (Acoustic)"	2018	—	—	—	—	—	—	—	—	—	Non-album singles
"Out of My Heart (Acoustic)"	2018	—	—	—	—	—	—	—	—	—	Non-album singles
"Bullet Train"	2019	—	—	—	—	—	—	—	—	—	Powerstation
"So Far Away"	2019	—	—	—	—	—	—	—	—	—	Powerstation
"Uncivil War"	2019	—	—	—	—	—	—	—	—	—	Powerstation
"Wolves"	2019	—	—	—	—	—	—	—	—	—	Powerstation
"Painting Lights"	2023	—	—	—	—	—	—	—	—	—	Non-album single
"Collide" (BBMak & The Last Arcade)	2024	—	—	—	—	—	—	—	—	—	Non-album single
"Christmas Day"	2026	—	—	—	—	—	—	—	—	—	Non-album single
"—" denotes releases that did not chart

=== Music videos ===
- "Back Here" (UK & US version) – directed by Dani Jacobs
- "Still on Your Side" (UK version) – directed by Dani Jacobs
- "Ghost of You and Me" – directed by Nigel Dick
- "Out of My Heart" – directed by Katie Bell
- "Staring into Space" – directed by Katie Bell

== DVDs/videos ==
- 2001 – Music in High Places: Live in Vietnam (DVD/VHS)
- 2001 – Sooner or Later: Our First Year in America (DVD/VHS)
- 2002 – Out of My Heart (Into Your Head) (DVD)
