= Bonnie Guitar discography =

- Studio albums: 13
- Compilation albums: 7
- Singles: 39
- Holiday albums: 1

This article documents the discography of American country artist Bonnie Guitar.

== Studio albums ==
=== 1950s and 1960s ===
Title	Album details	Peak positions
Title	Album details	US Country
Moonlight and Shadows	Release date: August 1957; Label: Dot Records; Formats: LP, music download	—
Whispering Hope	Release date: December 1958; Label: Dot Records; Formats: LP	—
Two Worlds	Release date: March 1966; Label: Dot Records; Formats: LP	15
Miss Bonnie Guitar	Release date: August 1966; Label: Dot Records; Formats: LP	21
Award-Winner	Release date: April 1967; Label: Dot Records; Formats: LP	38
Stop the Sun/A Woman in Love	Release date: February 1968; Label: Dot Records; Formats: LP, music download	—
I Believe in Love	Release date: July 1968; Label: Dot Records; Formats: LP	39
Leaves Are the Tears of Autumn	Release date: November 1968; Label: Dot Records; Formats: LP	—
Affair!	Release date: July 1969; Label: Dot Records; Formats: LP	40
"—" denotes releases that did not chart.

=== 1970s and 1980s ===
Title	Album details
Allegheny	Release date: 1970; Label: Paramount Records; Formats: LP
What Can I Say	Release date: 1987; Label: Playback Records; Formats: LP, music download
Yesterday	Release date: 1988; Label: Playback Records; Formats: LP
Today	Release date: 1988; Label: Playback Records; Formats: LP

== Holiday albums ==
Title	Album details
Merry Christmas from Bonnie Guitar	Release date: November 1966; Label: Dot Records; Formats: LP

== Compilation albums ==
Title	Album details
Dark Moon	Release date: October 1960; Label: Dot Records; Formats: LP
Bonnie Guitar Sings	Release date: 1966; Label: Hamilton Records; Formats: LP, music download
The Country's Favorite Lady of Songs	Release date: 1968; Label: Pickwick Records; Formats: LP
Night Train to Memphis	Release date: August 1969; Label: RCA Camden; Formats: LP
Dark Moon	Release date: April 1992; Label: Bear Family Records; Formats: CD
By the Fireside	Release date: April 19, 2011; Label: Bear Family Records; Formats: CD
Intimate Session	Release date: February 28, 2012; Label: Bear Family Records; Formats: CD

== Singles ==
=== 1950s ===
Year	Title	Peak chart positions		Album
Year	Title	US Country	US	Album
1956	"Hello, Hello Please Answer"	—	—	—N/a
1956	"Dream on Dreamers"	—	—	—N/a
1957	"Dark Moon"	14	6	Dark Moon
1957	"Half Your Heart"	—	—	Dark Moon
1957	"Mister Fire Eyes"	15	71	Dark Moon
1957	"I Saw Your Face in the Moon"	—	—	Dark Moon
1958	"Johnny Vagabond"	—	—	Dark Moon
1958	"I Found You Out"	—	—	Dark Moon
1958	"Love Is Over, Love Is Done"	—	—	—N/a
1958	"Shanty Boat"	—	—	—N/a
1958	"Whispering Hope"	—	—	Whispering Hope
1959	"Baby Moon"	—	—	Dark Moon
1959	"Candy Apple Red"	—	97	—N/a
"—" denotes releases that did not chart.

=== 1960s ===
Year	Title	Peak chart positions			Album
Year	Title	US Country	US	CAN Country	Album
1960	"Born to Be with You"^{[A]} (with Don Robertson)	—	—	—	—N/a
1961	"Tell Her Bye"	—	—	—	—N/a
1962	"Who Is She"	—	—	—	—N/a
1963	"Fool"	—	—	—	—N/a
1964	"The Outside Looking In"	—	—	—	—N/a
1965	"I'm Living in Two Worlds"	9	99	—	Two Worlds
1966	"Get Your Lie the Way You Want It"	14	—	—	Miss Bonnie Guitar
1966	"The Tallest Tree"	24	—	—	Award-Winner
1967	"The Kickin' Tree"	64	—	—	Award-Winner
1967	"You Can Steal Me"	33	—	—	Award-Winner
1967	"A Woman in Love"	4	—	13	Stop the Sun/A Woman in Love
1967	"Stop the Sun"	13	—	—	Stop the Sun/A Woman in Love
1968	"I Believe in Love"	10	—	30	I Believe in Love
1968	"Leaves Are the Tears of Autumn"	41	—	—	Leaves Are the Tears of Autumn
1969	"Perfect Stranger"	—	—	—	Affair!
1969	"That See Me Later Look"	36	—	—	Affair!
1969	"A Truer Love You'll Never Find" (with Buddy Killen)	55	—	—	Affair!
"—" denotes releases that did not chart.

=== 1970s and 1980s ===
Year	Title	Peak chart positions	Album
Year	Title	US Country	Album
1970	"Allegheny"	70	Allegheny
1972	"Happy Everything"	54	—N/a
1974	"The Bed I Lie In"	—	—N/a
1974	"From This Moment On"	95	—N/a
1975	"I Wanna Spend My Life with You"	—	—N/a
1980	"Honey on the Moon"	92	—N/a
1988	"What Can I Say"	—	What Can I Say
1989	"Still the Same"^{[B]}	79	What Can I Say
"—" denotes releases that did not chart.

== Other songs ==
=== Holiday singles ===
Year	Single	Album
1967	"I'll Be Missing You (Under the Mistletoe)"	Merry Christmas from Bonnie Guitar

== Music videos ==
Year	Title	Director
1987	"Let Him Go"	David J. Schweitzer

== Notes ==
- A "Born to Be with You" was credited with Don Robertson as "The Echoes".
- B "Still the Same" was included as a bonus track on the digital release of What Can I Say.
