= The Kingsmen in Person =

- US cover

Studio album by The Kingsmen
- Released: December 1963
- Recorded: April and November 1963
- Genre: Garage rock
- Length: 41:53
- Label: Wand 657
- Producer: Jerry Dennon

The Kingsmen chronology
| The Kingsmen in Person (1963) | The Kingsmen Volume II (1964) |

Singles from The Kingsmen In Person
- 1. "Louie Louie" Released: May 1963 (Wand 143); 2. "Money" Released: March 1964 (Wand 150)

Alternative cover
- UK cover

Alternative cover
- Germany cover

Alternative cover
- France cover

The Kingsmen in Person is the first album by American rock band the Kingsmen, released in 1963. The album contains the single "Louie Louie", the band's biggest success.

== Recording ==
Professional ratings
Review scores
| Source | Rating |
|---|---|
| AllMusic | 3.5/5 stars |
| Record Mirror | 4/5 stars |

The Kingsmen recorded "Louie Louie" at Northwestern Inc. recording studio on April 6, 1963. After being reissued by Wand, "Louie Louie" debuted in the Billboard Hot 100 at NO. 83 on November 9 and quickly began ascending the charts. Trying to capitalize on the success of the song, the Kingsmen decided to release an entire album, and gigs at the Chase nightclub were booked on November 15 and 16 to record what was to become The Kingsmen in Person.

Jack Ely, the singer of "Louie Louie", and bassist Bob Nordby appeared on no other tracks on the album because they quit before it was recorded. The album liner notes presented an abridged group history with no mention of Ely or Nordby, instead showcasing Lynn Easton as the group’s sole founder and creative force.

== Release and reception ==
After adding an announcer intro and "live audience" overdubbing, Wand quickly released the album for the Christmas purchasing season, and it first appeared on the Billboard Top LPs on January 18, 1964, eventually peaking at No. 20 and remaining on the chart for over two years (131 weeks total) until 1966.

The January 18, 1964 issue of Cash Box magazine reviewed the album:

The Kingsmen, who achieved national prominence with their smash Wand single of "Louie, Louie," tag this their premiere album after the hit and include eleven other rousing teen-angled dance-able items. The crew really swings up a storm as they dish-up winning renditions of "Money," "Mashed Potatoes" and "Mojo Workout." Disk seems destined to create an immediate stir.

Record Mirror's 1964 review described the Kingsmen as "a group with a lot more imagination and blues orientation than most."

Gold records for $1 million in sales were presented to group members in December 1965 at a "gold album party" hosted by Scepter-Wand Records. Attendees included Scepter-Wand president Florence Greenberg and guests Angie Dickinson, Burt Bacharach, Dionne Warwick, the Shirelles, George Maharis, Huntington Hartford, Gardner McKay, and Andy Warhol.

The LP was released in both mono (WDM 657) and stereo (WDS 657) versions. International releases included Canada (Reo 667), Germany (Vogue LDV 17002, different cover, titled The Kingsmen), Mexico (Orfeon/Videovox DML-MI-95), New Zealand (Fontana TL 08763), and United Kingdom (Pye International NPL 28050, different cover). A 1964 French release, En Public - Dansez Le Surf avec The Kingsmen (Disques Vogue LD 655 30), included a mix of tracks from the first two albums.

In 1993, Sundazed and Bear Family reissued the album on CD with bonus tracks "Haunted Castle", "The Krunch", and "(You Got) The Gamma Goochee", and with crowd noise and announcer intro removed. In 2016 the album was reissued in Japan by Old Days Records with bonus tracks "Little Latin Lupe Lu", "Death of an Angel", and "The Jolly Green Giant".

In 2012, Jack Rabid of AllMusic awarded the album 3.5 stars and said,

From "Mojo Workout" to "Night Train" to "Money" to the instrumental "You Can't Sit Down," the keyboards swirl above the stomp of the rhythm section and guitars, and it still makes people want to get drunk and go nuts. The band is primitive, sure, but boy does the spirit feel like a hot time.

In 2018, Paste Magazine ranked the album No. 18 in a list of "50 Best Garage Rock Albums of All Time" and described it as "a raw, dynamic romp from start to finish, highlighted by the live, crowd-heavy recording" and that it is "exactly what garage rock should be – acceptably messy and rousingly energetic."

== Track listing ==
1. Louie, Louie – 2:44 (Richard Berry)
2. The Waiting – 3:08 (Don Gallucci, Lynn Easton)
3. Mojo Workout – 2:28 (Julian Bright)
4. Fever – 3:07 (Otis Blackwell, Eddie Cooley)
5. Money – 2:24 (Berry Gordy, Janie Bradford)
6. Bent Scepter – 2:59 (Don Gallucci)
7. Long Tall Texan – 2:44 (Henry Strzelecki)
8. You Can't Sit Down – 2:59 (Dee Clark, Cornell Muldrow)
9. Twist & Shout – 4:55 (Phil Medley, Bert Russell)
10. J.A.J. – 2:20 (Dave Lewis)
11. Night Train – 2:18 (Jimmy Forest, Oscar Washington, Lewis C. Simpkins)
12. Mashed Potatoes – 2:33 (Dessie Rozier)
13. Haunted Castle† – 2:47 (Lynn Easton)
14. The Krunch† – 2:18 (Lynn Easton)
15. (You Got) The Gamma Goochee† – 2:09 (John Mangiagli)

† CD bonus tracks

The 8-track tape release (Wand WDX-5657) divided the track list into four programs and altered the track order to 1-10-12, 3-4-6, 8-7-2, 11-9-5. Reel-to-reel, 4-track, and cassette versions were also released.

== Chart positions ==
Weekly chart peaks for The Kingsmen in Person
| Chart (1963—1964) | Peak position |
|---|---|
| US Billboard Top LPs | 20 |
| US Cashbox Top 100 Monaural Albums | 16 |
| US Music Vendor Top LPs | 33 |

== Musicians and production ==
- Lynn Easton: vocals, saxophone, drums
- Mike Mitchell: guitar
- Don Gallucci: keyboards
- Norm Sundholm: bass
- Gary Abbott: drums
- Jack Ely: vocals, guitar ("Louie Louie" and "Haunted Castle" only)
- Bob Nordby: bass ("Louie Louie" and "Haunted Castle" only)
- Liner notes: Dick Zimmerman (Cash Box)
- CD booklet layout: Jeff Smith
