= The Kingsmen Greatest Hits =

- US cover

Greatest hits album by The Kingsmen
- Released: 1966
- Genre: Garage rock
- Length: 33:43
- Label: Wand
- Producers: Paul Tannen, Mark Wildey

The Kingsmen chronology
Up and Away (1966)	The Kingsmen Greatest Hits (1966)	The Best of the Kingsmen (1972)

Alternative cover
- UK cover

Alternative cover
- Germany cover

The Kingsmen Greatest Hits is the seventh album by American rock band The Kingsmen, released in 1966.

== Release and reception ==
The Kingsmen's seventh album completed their career arc in the 1960s with a compilation of previous releases including all eight of their Billboard Hot 100 singles. One new song, "Don't Say No" (released as a single in 1967), was also included. The album did not make the Billboard LP chart.

Both mono (WDM 681) and stereo (WDS 681) versions were released. International releases included Canada (Wand 681) and United Kingdom (Marble Arch MAL829, different cover, only ten tracks). The LP was also released in Germany in 1973 (Metronome 200 104, different cover). The album has not been reissued on CD.

The group described the album cover as a "licorice pizza".

== Track listing ==
1. Louie, Louie – 3:00 (Richard Berry)
2. The Jolly Green Giant – 1:56 (L. Easton, Don Harris, Dewey Terry)
3. Long Green – 2:36 (L. Easton)
4. Little Latin Lupe Lu – 2:22 (P. Medley)
5. The Climb – 2:32 (L. Easton)
6. Annie Fanny – 2:05 (L. Easton)
7. Money – 2:25 (B. Gordy-J. Bradford)
8. Killer Joe – 2:15 (Russell-Elgin-Medley)
9. Something's Got a Hold on Me – 3:07 (P. Woods-E. James-L. Kirkland)
10. A Hard Day's Night – 2:20 (J. Lennon-P. McCartney)
11. Mother In Law – 2:31 (A. Toussaint)
12. Don't Say No – 1:58 (Bartholemew-Richardson)
13. David's Mood – 2:06 (D. Lewis)
14. Death of an Angel – 2:30 (D. Woods)

The initial 8-track tape release (Wand 821–681) had only 12 tracks and a different order (A: 4–7–11, B: 2–3–12, C: 1–10–14, D: 6–9–13), omitting "The Climb" and "Killer Joe", and with the cover listing only "12 Great Hits" vs. "14 Great Hits" on the LP. The cassette tape release likewise had only 12 tracks and a different order (A: 4-7-11-2-3-13, B: 1-10-14-6-9-12), omitting the same two tracks and switching the positions of "David's Mood" and "Don't Say No". A later 8-track tape release (Wand TWDS 681) had 16 tracks, repeating "Little Latin Lupe Lu" and "Money", and a different order (A: 1-4-5-13, 2-3-7-14, 8-9-10-12, 4-6-7-11). An early reel-to-reel release (Wand 21-681) had only 12 tracks while a later release (Wand WDX 681) had 14.

== Musicians and production ==
All tracks except as noted below:

- Lynn Easton: vocals, saxophone
- Mike Mitchell: lead guitar
- Dick Peterson: drums
- Barry Curtis: keyboards
- Norm Sundholm: bass

Louie Louie

- Jack Ely: vocals, guitar
- Lynn Easton: drums
- Mike Mitchell: lead guitar
- Don Gallucci: keyboards
- Bob Nordby: bass

Money

- Lynn Easton: vocals, saxophone
- Mike Mitchell: lead guitar
- Gary Abbott: drums
- Barry Curtis: keyboards
- Norm Sundholm: bass

Don't Say No

- Mike Mitchell: lead guitar, vocals
- Dick Peterson: drums, guitar, vocals
- J. C. Rieck: keyboards, vocals
- Jeff Beals: bass

Producers: Paul Tannen & Mark Wildey. Liner notes: Sam Goff. Art direction and cover design: Burt Goldblatt.
