= The Kingsmen on Campus =

Studio album by The Kingsmen
- Released: 1965
- Genre: Pop
- Length: 39:15
- Label: Wand
- Producer: Jerry Dennon

The Kingsmen chronology
The Kingsmen Volume 3 (1965)	The Kingsmen on Campus (1965)	15 Great Hits (1966)

Singles from The Kingsmen On Campus
- 1. "The Climb" Released: April 1965 (Wand 183); 2. "Annie Fanny" Released: July 1965 (Wand 189)

The Kingsmen on Campus is the fourth album by the rock band The Kingsmen, released in 1965.

== Release and reception ==
Professional ratings
Review scores
Source	Rating
AllMusic	2.0/5 stars
Record Mirror	3/5 stars

The Kingsmen's fourth album featured two chart singles, "The Climb" (#65) and "Annie Fanny (#47), plus several Northwest and R&B classics, a cover of the Beatles' "A Hard Day's Night" and two Lynn Easton compositions. The album entered the Billboard Top LPs chart on October 30, 1965, and remained for 17 weeks, peaking at No. 68.

The album received mixed reviews and only a two-star rating from AllMusic where Joe Viglione's review stated, "... it is obvious the band loved classic R&B. Too bad they couldn't inject it into their performances on record. Despite the lack of passion, "The Climb" ranks with "Annie Fanny" as the best two tracks to be found in the grooves of The Kingsmen on Campus." Melody Maker's review said, "An obviously talented and experienced combo, they often come up with some nice sounds and some good bluesy organ and then suddenly a relapse into gooey rubbish."

The album's sales and chart tenure were supported by the ongoing controversy over the lyrics of "Louie Louie" and the Kingsmen's extensive touring schedule. As with earlier albums, crowd noise was dubbed on some tracks to simulate a live performance. The back of the LP jacket featured a collage of college and university pennants emblematic of the Kingsmen's reputation as a "frat rock" and college concert band.

The LP was released in both mono (WDM 670) and stereo (WDS 670) versions. International releases included Canada (Reo 682), South Africa (Scepter SLP 6003), and United Kingdom (Pye International NPL 28068). In 1994 Sundazed and Bear Family reissued the album on CD with bonus tracks "Get Out of My Life Woman", "Don't Say No" and "My Wife Can't Cook", all previously released only as singles, and with crowd noise overdubs removed on all tracks.

A reference to the album cover occurs in the 2003 movie Old School when the main characters, dressed in cardigan sweaters, walk down the Janss Steps located on the UCLA campus.

A parody album, The Kongsmen on Campus, was released in 2010 on the German label Soundflat Records.

== Track listing ==
1. Annie Fanny – 2:05 (Lynn Easton)
2. Rosalie – 3:09 (Robin Roberts)
3. A Hard Day's Night – 2:21 (John Lennon, Paul McCartney)
4. Stand By Me – (3:47) (Ben E. King, Jerry Leiber and Mike Stoller)
5. Little Green Thing – 1:59 (Dave Lewis)
6. The Climb – 2:31 (Lynn Easton)
7. Sticks and Stones – 1:52 (Titus Turner)
8. Peter Gunn – 4:45 (Henry Mancini)
9. Sometimes – 2:46 (Gene Thomasson)
10. Shotgun – 2:37 (Autry Dewalt)
11. I Like It Like That – 1:56 (Chris Kenner, Allen Toussaint)
12. Genevieve – 2:30 (Huey "Piano" Smith)
13. Get Out of My Life Woman† – 2:47 (Allen Toussaint)
14. Don't Say No† – 1:58 (Curt Bartholemew, Nicholas Richardson)
15. My Wife Can't Cook† – 2:12 (Gerald Russ)

† CD bonus tracks

Note: Track times are from the Sundazed reissue CD and differ in some cases from listings on the original Wand LP.

== Chart positions ==
Weekly chart peaks for The Kingsmen on Campus
Chart (1965)	Peak position
US Billboard Top LPs	68
US Cashbox Top 100 Albums	52
US Record World 100 Top LPs	55

== Musicians and production ==
- Lynn Easton: vocals, saxophone
- Mike Mitchell: vocals, lead guitar
- Barry Curtis: organist
- Norm Sundholm: bass guitar
- Dick Peterson: drums
- Producer: A Jerden Production by Jerry Dennon
- Arranger: Lynn Easton and The Kingsmen
- Engineer: Kearney Barton
- Studio: Audio Recording, Seattle, Washington
- CD booklet layout: Jeff Smith
