= 15 Great Hits =

Studio album by The Kingsmen
- Released: 1966
- Genre: Pop
- Length: 40:53
- Label: Wand
- Producer: Jerry Dennon

The Kingsmen chronology
The Kingsmen on Campus (1965)	15 Great Hits (1966)	Up and Away (1966)

Singles from The Kingsmen 15 Great Hits
- 1. "Killer Joe" Released: March 1966 (Wand 1115)

15 Great Hits is the fifth album by the rock band The Kingsmen, released in 1966.

== Release and reception ==
The Kingsmen's fifth album was an amalgam containing seven new songs, one previously released single, four alternate versions of previously released songs, and three tracks from earlier LPs. The album entered the Billboard LP chart on August 20, 1966, and remained for eight weeks, peaking at No. 87. The album's sales were supported by the continued popularity of "Louie Louie" (re-released in 1966 as "Louie Louie 64-65-66") and the Kingsmen's busy touring schedule.

Both mono (WDM 674) and stereo (WDS 674) versions were released. International releases included Canada (Wand 674), France (Disques Vogue CLVLXS 101 30), Taiwan (CSJ 519, orange vinyl), and United Kingdom (Pye International NPL 28085). The album has not been reissued on CD.

This was the group's fifth and final album chart appearance, and the last effort by the 1963-1966 line-up of Lynn Easton, Mike Mitchell, Barry Curtis, Dick Peterson, and Norm Sundholm. Later in 1966, Barry Curtis was drafted and Norm Sundholm left to develop Sunn amplifiers.

== Track listing ==
1. Twist & Shout – 2:58 (P. Medley-B. Russell)
2. Money – 2:13 (B. Gordy-J. Bradford)
3. Jenny Take a Ride (C.C. Rider) – 3:14 (B. Crewe-E. Johnson-R. Penniman)
4. Do You Love Me – 2:36 (Berry Gordy)
5. Oo Poo Pah Doo – 3:01 (Jessie Hill)
6. Shout – 2:22 (Isley Brothers)
7. New Orleans – 2:53 (F. Guida-J. Royster)
8. Fever – 3:14 (Eddie Cooley & Otis Blackwell)
9. Killer Joe – 2:15 (Russell-Elgin-Medley)
10. Good Lovin' – 2:17 (A. Resnick-R. Clark)
11. Quarter to Three – 2:05 (F. Guida-G. Barge-J. Royster)
12. Poison Ivy – 2:09 (J. Leiber-M. Stoller)
13. Searchin' – 3:22 (J. Leiber-M. Stoller)
14. Hang On Sloopy – 2:42 (Russell-W. Farrell)
15. Satisfaction – 3:32 (Jagger/Richards)

== Charts ==
Weekly chart peaks for 15 Great Hits
Chart (1966)	Peak position
US Billboard Top LPs	87
US Cashbox Top 100 Albums	97
US Record World 100 Top LPs	77

== Musicians and production ==
- Lynn Easton: vocals, saxophone
- Mike Mitchell: vocals, lead guitar
- Barry Curtis: organist
- Norm Sundholm: bass guitar
- Dick Peterson: drums
- Producer: A Jerden Production by Jerry Dennon
- Liner notes: Don Steele (KHJ)
- Cover design: Burt Goldblatt
