= The Kingsmen Volume 3 =

Studio album by The Kingsmen
- Released: 1965
- Genre: Garage rock
- Length: 36:11
- Label: Wand
- Producer: Jerry Dennon for Jerden Productions

The Kingsmen chronology
The Kingsmen Volume II (1964)	The Kingsmen Volume 3 (1965)	The Kingsmen on Campus (1966)

Singles from The Kingsmen Volume 3
- 1. "The Jolly Green Giant" Released: Dec 1964 (Wand 172)

The Kingsmen Volume 3 is the third album by American rock band the Kingsmen, released in 1965.

== Release and reception ==
Professional ratings
Review scores
Source	Rating
AllMusic	3.5/5 stars

The Kingsmen's third album featured "The Jolly Green Giant", a novelty number which reached No. 4 on the Billboard Hot 100 chart and No. 25 on the Billboard R&B chart, along with several other R&B classics and a couple of Wailers covers. As with previous albums, crowd noise overdubs were added on some tracks to simulate a live performance. The album sold well due to the success of "The Jolly Green Giant", the group's frenetic touring schedule, and the ongoing controversy over the lyrics of "Louie Louie". It entered the Billboard Top LPs chart on February 20, 1965, and remained for 18 weeks, peaking at No. 22.

The February 27, 1965 issue of Billboard magazine reviewed the album:

The boys are in the pop music forefront again with their hit single, "Jolly Green Giant". This their third album contains the gutsy, earthy delivery that has marked their past hits ("Louie Louie") and the new single. To add to the excitement, Wand has dubbed in audience crowd noises.

The LP was released in the U.S. in mono (WDM 662) and stereo (WDS 662) versions, and also released in Canada (Reo 676) and Taiwan (First FL-1305, orange vinyl, titled Hello! The Kingsmen). The album was not released in the UK. In 1993, Sundazed and Bear Family reissued the album on CD with bonus tracks "Since You Been Gone", "It's Only the Dog" and "The Wolf of Manhattan", and without crowd noise overdubs. The CD also moved "The Jolly Green Giant" from track 1 to track 3.

Early LP pressings omitted bassist Norm Sundholm from the sleeve notes. The title on the labels was "Vol. III" vs. "Volume 3" elsewhere. The Canadian release had a yellow sticker at the top of the cover with "Featuring Jolly Green Giant", the Kingsmen single that reached No. 1 on the Canadian chart.

== Track listing ==
1. "Over You" – 2:05 (Lynn Easton)
2. "That's Cool, That's Trash" – 2:12 (P.F. Sloan, Steve Barri)
3. "The Jolly Green Giant" – 1:57 (L. Easton, Don Harris, Dewey Terry)
4. "Don't You Just Know It" – 2:55 (Huey "Piano" Smith, Johnny Vincent)
5. "I'll Go Crazy" – 1:52 (Lee Allman)
6. "La-Do-Dada" – 2:40 (Dale Hawkins, Margaret Lewis)
7. "Long Green" – 2:37 (Lynn Easton)
8. "Mother in Law" – 2:32 (Allen Toussaint)
9. "Shout" – 2:24 (Ronald Isley, Rudolph Isley, O'Kelly Isley)
10. "Searchin' for Love" – 2:06 (Wayne Gust)
11. "Tall Cool One" – 2:35 (Rick Dangel, Kent Morrill, John Greek)
12. "Comin' Home Baby" – 2:23 (Ben Tucker, Bob Dorough)
13. "Since You Been Gone"† – 3:08 (Rick Dangel, John (Buck) Ormsby, Kent Morrill)
14. "It's Only the Dog"† – 2:13 (Artie Wayne, Hugh McCracken)
15. "The Wolf of Manhattan"† – 2:32 (Joey Levine, Arthur Resnick)

† CD bonus tracks

Note: Track order and times are from the Sundazed reissue CD and differ in some cases from the original Wand LP.

The 8-track release (Wand 92-662) divided the track list into four programs and altered the track order to 3-7-12, 1-2-4, 5-6-11, 8-9-10.

== Chart positions ==
Weekly chart peaks for The Kingsmen Volume 3
Chart (1965)	Peak position
US Billboard Top LPs	22
US Cashbox Top 100 Albums	10
US Record World 100 Top LPs	11

== Musicians and production ==
- Lynn Easton: vocals, saxophone
- Mike Mitchell: guitar, vocals
- Barry Curtis: keyboards, vocals
- Dick Peterson: drums, vocals
- Norm Sundholm: bass, vocals
- Producer: All tracks produced by Jerry Dennon for Jerden Productions except "The Wolf of Manhattan" produced by Paul Tannen
- Arranger: The Kingsmen
- Engineer: Kearney Barton
- Studio: Audio Recording, Inc., Seattle, Washington
- Album design: Mitchell-Morrison, Inc.
- CD booklet layout: Jeff Smith
