= The Kingsmen Volume II =

- US cover

Studio album by The Kingsmen
- Released: 1964
- Genre: Garage rock
- Length: 35:59
- Label: Wand
- Producers: Jerden Productions, Stan Green

The Kingsmen chronology
The Kingsmen in Person (1963)	The Kingsmen Volume II (1964)	The Kingsmen Volume 3 (1965)

Singles from The Kingsmen Volume II
- 1. "Little Latin Lupe Lu" Released: July 1964 (Wand 157); 2. "Death of an Angel" Released: Sept 1964 (Wand 164)

Alternative cover
- UK cover

The Kingsmen Volume II is the second album by the rock band The Kingsmen, released in 1964.

== Release and reception ==
Professional ratings
Review scores
Source	Rating
AllMusic	3.0/5 stars

The Kingsmen released Volume II (subtitled "More Great Sounds From The Group That Gave You "Louie, Louie") to capitalize on the continued success of "Louie Louie" and recent hits "Little Latin Lupe Lu" (#46) and "Death Of An Angel" (#42). As with the first album, crowd noise overdubs were added to simulate a live performance. It first appeared on the Billboard Top LPs chart September 26, 1964, and remained for 37 weeks, peaking at No. 15.

The September 12, 1964 issue of Cash Box magazine reviewed the album:

The Kingsmen, who are still scoring with their initial "Louie, Louie" album, seem destined to go a like success route with this raunchy, hard-driving package of recent vintage selections and oldies. The guys pull out all the stops as they render pulsating readings of "Little Latin Lupe Lu," "Long Green" and "Great Balls Of Fire." Disk should skyrocket.

The album title is "Volume II" on the front of the LP jacket and "Volume 2" on the spine, back, and on both record labels. Initial pressings of the album had "And You Believed Him" as the last track, but "Death Of An Angel" was substituted mid-production along with a yellow sticker at the bottom of the LP jacket proclaiming "Featuring Death Of An Angel." Later pressings had the revised track list on the cover.

The LP was released in both mono (WDM 659) and stereo (WDS 659) versions. International releases included Canada (Reo 674) and United Kingdom (Pye International NPL 28054, different cover). A 1964 French release, En Public - Dansez Le Surf avec The Kingsmen (Disques Vogue LD 655 30), included a mix of tracks from the first two albums. In 1993 Sundazed and Bear Family reissued the album on CD with bonus tracks "And You Believed Him" and "Give Her Lovin'" while removing the crowd noise overdubs on all tracks.

== Track listing ==
1. Kingsmen Introduction – 2:11 (Lynn Easton)
2. Little Latin Lupe Lu – 2:36 (Bill Medley)
3. Long Green – 2:38 (Lynn Easton)
4. Do You Love Me – 2:37 (Berry Gordy)
5. New Orleans – 2:24 (Frank Guida, Joseph Royster)
6. Walking the Dog – 2:09 (Rufus Thomas)
7. David's Mood – 2:07 (Dave Lewis)
8. Something's Got a Hold on Me – 3:10 (Pearl Woods, Etta James, Leroy Kirkland)
9. Let the Good Times Roll – 1:53 (Shirley Goodman, Leonard Lee)
10. Ooh Poo Pah Doo – 3:02 (Jessie Hill)
11. Great Balls of Fire – 1:48 (Otis Blackwell, Jack Hammer)
12. Linda Lou – 2:33 (Ray Sharpe)
13. Death of An Angel – 2:33 (Donald Woods)
14. And You Believed Him† – 2:31 (Lynn Easton)
15. Give Her Lovin'† – 1:47 (Lynn Easton)

† CD bonus tracks

Note: Times are from the Sundazed reissue CD and differ in some cases from listings on the original Wand LP.

== Chart positions ==
Weekly chart peaks for The Kingsmen Volume II
Chart (1964)	Peak position
US Billboard Top LPs	15
US Cashbox Top 100 Monaural Albums	11
US Record World 100 Top LPs	8

== Musicians and production ==
- Lynn Easton: vocals, saxophone
- Mike Mitchell: guitar
- Barry Curtis: keyboards
- Dick Peterson: drums
- Norm Sundholm: bass
- Produced by Jerdan (sic) Productions and Stan Green
- Liner notes by Wink Martindale (KFWB)
- CD booklet layout: Jeff Smith
