= Up and Away =

- L-R Mike Mitchell, J.C. Rieck, Pete Borg, Lynn Easton, Dick Peterson

Studio album by The Kingsmen
- Released: 1966
- Genre: Garage rock
- Length: 37:46
- Label: Wand
- Producers: Paul Tannen, Mark Wildey

The Kingsmen chronology
15 Great Hits (1966)	Up and Away (1966)	The Kingsmen Greatest Hits (1966)

Singles from Up and Away
- 1. "Little Sally Tease" Released: June 1966 (Wand 1127); 2. "If I Needed Someone" Released: October 1966 (Wand 1137); 3. "Trouble" Released: January 1967 (Wand 1147); 4. "Children's Caretaker" Released: April 1967 (Wand 1154); 5. "(I Have Found) Another Girl" Released: May 1967 (Wand 1157)

Alternative cover
- UK cover

Up and Away is the sixth album by the rock band The Kingsmen, released in 1966.

== Release and reception ==
The Kingsmen's sixth album represented a departure from previous efforts with new producers and a revamped line-up. Barry Curtis had been drafted and Norm Sundholm left to manage his Sunn amplifiers business. Their respective replacements were J.C. Rieck on keyboards with Kerry Magness and then Pete Borg on bass. Also new to the team were producers Paul Tannen and Mark Wildey.

The track list features a combination of reliable pop and R&B standards mixed with songs written by group members. This was the first Kingsmen album not to make the Billboard LP chart—an indication of the group's waning popularity as musical tastes changed in the mid-60s.

The January 7, 1967 issue of Billboard Magazine reviewed the album:

The "Louie Louie" group has come up with a change of pace package loaded with excitement. They run the gauntlet from the folk-oriented "If I Needed Someone" and "Grass Is Green" to hard rockers "Mustang Sally" and "Shake A Tail Feather." The well balanced and well loaded (14 selections) album can't miss.

Both mono (WDM 675) and stereo (WDS 675) versions were released. International releases included Canada (Wand 675C) and United Kingdom (Wand WNS 6, different cover). The album was reissued on CD by Sundazed and Bear Family in 1994 with bonus track "Killer Joe".

== Track listing ==
1. Trouble – 2:20 (A. Resnick-J. Levine)
2. If I Needed Someone – 2:47 (G. Harrison)
3. Grass Is Green – 2:18 (D. Peterson-M. Mitchell)
4. Tossin' and Turnin' – 2:40 (R. Adams-M. Rene)
5. Under My Thumb – 3:02 (Jagger/Richards)
6. Wild Thing – 2:38 (Chip Taylor)
7. (I Have Found) Another Girl – 2:18 (B. Curtis-D. Peterson)
8. Daytime Shadows – 2:14 (L. Easton-P. Tannen-M. Wildey)
9. Shake a Tail Feather – 2:13 (O. Hayes-Andre Williams-Verlie Rice)
10. Children's Caretaker – 1:31 (Dick Peterson)
11. Land of a Thousand Dances – 2:47 (C. Kenner-Fats Domino)
12. Mustang Sally – 2:25 (Bonny Rice)
13. Little Sally Tease – 2:50 (Jim Valley)
14. Hush-a-Bye – 3:25 (D. Pomus-M. Shuman)
15. Killer Joe† – 2:18 (Russell-Elgin-Medley)

† CD bonus track.

== Musicians and production ==
- Lynn Easton: vocals, saxophone
- Mike Mitchell: lead guitar, vocals
- Dick Peterson: drums
- J.C. Rieck: keyboards, vocals
- Pete Borg: bass guitar
- Producers: Paul Tannen & Mark Wildey
- Liner notes: Mel Shayne (Manager)
- Cover design: Burt Goldblatt
- CD producer: Bob Irwin
