= Alice Nadine Morrison =

American songwriter and musician

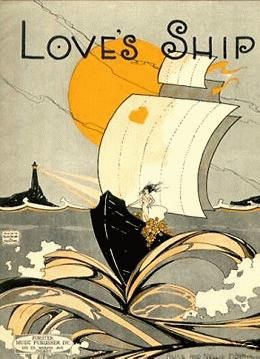
Sheet music for "Love's Ship" by Alice Nadine Morrison, Forster Music, 1920

Alice Nadine Morrison (1892-1978), birth name Alice Nadine Lanterman, was an American songwriter and musician. With her husband Howell Oakdeane "Morrie" Morrison (1888-1984) she was involved in numerous music-related business ventures, including Morrison Records.

== Life ==
Born in Anacortes, Washington, while still in her teens she accompanied silent films in local theaters. She married Alabama-born dance instructor and drummer "Morrie" Morrison in 1912. The couple had a son in 1913, and moved to Bellingham, Washington in 1914. In 1919, she wrote the waltz "My Love Is All For You." The Morrisons started the Morrison Music Company to publish the sheet music; it was successful enough that Chicago-based Forster Publishing licensed the song, issuing it as "Say You'll Be Mine (My Love Is All For You)." The song became a national hit in 1920; a reported half a million copies of the sheet music sold; a player piano roll was issued in Los Angeles by Film Music Company and the Green Brothers Novelty Band released a recording on New York's Emerson Phonograph Co. label.

She and her sister-in-law Nellie Morrison co-wrote a second hit in 1920, "Love's Ship." With Forster's involvement, the sheet music sold a reported million copies. It was included in the score for the 1920 silent film Shore Acres. Tenor Joseph O'Hara recorded the song for Brunswick Records; the Club De Vingt Orchestra released a medley of "My Love Is All For You" and "Love's Ship" on Edison Records. A third song, "Sweet Anabel," (1922) sold a reported 100,000 sheet copies, published by Seattle's Capitol Music.

She and her husband formed the Morrison's Marimba Xylophone Orchestra and briefly opened Morrison's Dancing Academy in Bellingham, but soon relocated to San Francisco, where they took a suite 502 in that city's Pantages Theatre Building. Her husband pursued various ventures, including another dancehall/school, while she worked as a song-plugger at Woolworth's and Kress. She also performed in the Fox Follies at the Fox-Oakland Theater and played marimba solos live on KPO radio.

However, in San Francisco the Morrisons' star soon faded. Their orchestra became a touring group "performing," Peter Blecha writes, "in upended barns, grange halls, open fields, anywhere and everywhere." Home was successively Sacramento, California, Weed, Roseville, Dunsmuir, and finally, with somewhat rising fortunes, back to Seattle in 1931. Over the next decade, the Morrisons (now including a second soon) would tour around Washington State, and slowly expand an empire of dance halls that would become the G.T.M. Corporation. By 1940, the G.T.M. Corporation had 128 other dancehalls in the Western United States, six of them in Seattle.

Her songwriting career revived in the 1940s. The Ink Spots recorded "Goodbye, Little Girl, Goodbye" (1944) and The Andrews Sisters picked up "Please Don’t Sing That Song Again" (1946). In this same period, her husband started Morrison Records. A major part of their business was an offer to "Get Your Poem Set To Music." Alice or husband Morrie would write a tune, the Morrison Recording Orchestra would record it, and one of them, or often the customer, would sing. They also picked up some more major performers (such as Paul Tutmarc and Bonnie Guitar and scored a national distribution deal with Vega Records.

An inheritance around 1954 allowed the Morrisons to purchase a mansion at 1025 1st Avenue W on Queen Anne Hill, the pre-World War II residence of the Japanese Consul in Seattle. With the mansion as a headquarters they continued various ventures in music (and even film), but with changing styles in music they never again reached the level of success they had in the 1920s and '40s.

Morrison had two sons. Morrison died in 1978, her husband in 1984.
