= Howell Oakdeane Morrison =

American musician

Howell Oakdeane Morrison (1888–1984), also known as "Morrie" Morrison, was an American musician, dance instructor, impresario and entrepreneur, founder of Seattle-based Morrison Records. From 1912, he was married to songwriter and musician Alice Nadine Morrison (1892-1978).

== Life ==
Born in Alabama, Morrison moved with his family to Marysville, Washington in 1900. His older brothers played in a variety of bands and he traveled with circuses for a while. By 1907 he was a dance instructor and a drummer in a local dance band. He met the young Alice Nadine Lanterman, who accompanied silent films in Anacortes, Washington-area theaters; they married in 1912, had a son, Lew, in 1913, and moved to Bellingham, Washington in 1914, where he started a dancing school.

The couple started the Morrison Music Company to promote Alice's 1919 waltz "My Love Is All For You." The song was picked up by Chicago's Forster Publishing, and became a national hit, the first of several for Alice. The Morrisons formed Morrison's Marimba Xylophone Orchestra, and briefly expanded the dance school, before moving to San Francisco in 1922. There they took a suite 502 in that city's Pantages Theatre Building and began a series of musical ventures. While Alice worked as a song-plugger and performer, Morrie opened another dancehall/school and produced a successful stage show King of Melody Land.

However, success in San Francisco did not last. Their orchestra became a touring group "performing," Peter Blecha writes, "in upended barns, grange halls, open fields, anywhere and everywhere." Home was successively Sacramento, California, Weed, Roseville, Dunsmuir, and finally, with somewhat rising fortunes, back to Seattle in 1931. Over the next decade, the Morrisons (now including son Lew) would tour around Washington State, and slowly expand an empire of dance halls that would become the G.T.M. Corporation. By 1940, the G.T.M. Corporation had 128 other dancehalls in the Western United States, six of them in Seattle.

Two more hits for Alice provided the money for a US$20,000 musical extravaganza Yesterday, Today, Tomorrow at Seattle's Metropolitan Theatre; it was a flop. In the same period, with more success, he founded Morrison Records. Initially selling dance-oriented songs to his dance students, the label went on to record many local amateurs and eventually professionals such as Paul Tutmarc and Bonnie Guitar.

An inheritance around 1954 allowed the Morrisons to purchase a mansion at 1025 1st Avenue W on Queen Anne Hill, the pre-World War II residence of the Japanese Consul in Seattle. Morrison records, although always a bit of a mom-and-pop business, expanded to handle all aspects of the record-making process except for cutting pressing masters from tape.

By the mid-1950s Morrison was selling "motion picture reels and prerecorded tapes" of his dance lessons. In 1955 he issued a 75-page booklet Morrie Morrison’s Dance Book: A Journey In The Land of Terpsichore, a work Peter Blecha describes as "eccentric." A later venture into film—Morrie Morrison’s Unique and Colorful Motion Picture, the Discovery of the Elysian Phenomena and A Show Of Shows was, according to Blecha "seemingly based on a charmingly eccentric blend of mystifyingly cosmic concepts and straight-up aerobic principles." In 1975, roughly a decade into production of the film, the Morrisons sold their mansion. The film was eventually completed; it did not find any substantial audience.

Alice died in 1978, Morrie in 1984. Their son Lew played professionally until about 1994, son Ken (professionally a freelance television producer) remained a locally active musician as of 2005.
