= Morrison Records (Seattle) =

Morrison Records was an independent record label, based in Seattle, Washington, United States. It was founded in the 1940s by Howell Oakdeane "Morrie" Morrison (1888-1984) and his wife, Alice Nadine Morrison (1892-1978), and appears to have gone out of business around the time of its founders' deaths. Much of their catalogue consisted of vanity recordings by local amateur talent, but Paul Tutmarc and his wife Bonnie Guitar were among those who released records on Morrison. According to Peter Blecha, the label "generally leaned towards the old-fashioned strains preferred by ballroom dancers."

Morrison began in a space in downtown Seattle at Second and Pike. In the 1950s they negotiated a national distribution deal with Vega Records and set up a warehouse and shipping center on Queen Anne Hill, a studio near Green Lake and a pressing plant in Belltown. Master tapes were sent to California to be turned into stamps to press vinyl records. Each record was hand-pressed on colored vinyl, and because of their hand-pressing process, they could put any two songs in their catalog on opposite sides of a single disc.
