= Mike Mitchell (musician) =

American musician (1944–2021)

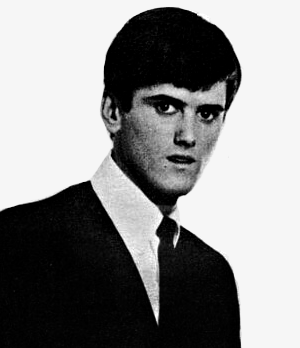
- Mitchell in 1966

Background information
- Born: April 16, 1944; Portland, Oregon, US
- Died: April 16, 2021 (aged 77)
- Genres: Rock
- Instrument: Guitar
- Years active: 1957–2021
- Formerly of: The Kingsmen

Mike Mitchell (April 16, 1944 – April 16, 2021) was an American musician. Mitchell was the guitarist for The Kingsmen from 1959 until his death in 2021. His guitar solo on "Louie Louie" is recognized as one of the most famous of all time.

== Early life ==
Mitchell was born in Portland, Oregon to a musical family and had two siblings, brother Dennis (twelve years younger) and sister Viva. His father, who played country and western songs on guitar, taught him to play. He attended David Douglas High School.

== Career ==
While in high school he met Lynn Easton who invited him into his band with Jack Ely, who went to Washington High School. The trio then brought in Bob Nordby on bass and practiced in Mitchell's home garage.

The band came to fame with their first single, a cover of Richard Berry’s "Louie Louie". The song set the tone for the garage rock genre, but also sparked controversy due to alleged obscene lyrics. It was rumored that the vocals were slurred to cover up profanities and the song was soon banned by many American radio stations and was banned entirely by Indiana Governor Matthew E. Welsh. The actual lyrics were not obscene. The vocals were indecipherable because the microphone was several feet up in the air and vocalist Jack Ely had to lean backwards to sing; he was also wearing braces. An inconclusive FBI investigation into the song lasted for 31 months.

The Kingsmen’s version of the song influenced many and has been covered by The Beach Boys, Jan and Dean, the Troggs, the Sonics, the Beatles, Mothers of Invention, Motörhead, Black Flag, Iggy Pop, and many more. In a 1999 interview with Australian DJ, Mitchell said he was not bothered by the band only being known for "Louie Louie": "We're just happy to have any success, that we can still do this, It's actually a wonderful career that we've had".

His "Louie Louie" guitar break has been called "iconic", "blistering", and "one of the most famous guitar solos of all time". Guitar Player magazine noted, "Raw, lightning-fast, and loud, the solo's unbridled energy helped make the song a No. 2 pop hit, but also helped set the template for garage-rock – and later hard-rock – guitar."

== Personal life and death ==
Mitchell had a heart bypass operation in the early 1990s, but continued to tour after recovering.

Mitchell died on his 77th birthday on April 16, 2021. His death was confirmed by Dick Peterson, Kingsmen drummer since 1963, in a statement to Rolling Stone that he died "peacefully". A cause of death was not given. At the time of his death, he was the last original member of the Kingsmen who was still in the band. He is survived by two children, Samantha and Max, and two siblings.

Guitarist Joe Walsh said of Mitchell: "My sincere condolences. I learned to play the guitar because of Mike Mitchell. I know every one of his solos, mistakes and all. We’re losing the good guys."
