= Peter Blecha =

American historian and author

- Born: Seattle, Washington, U.S.
- Education: University of Washington
- Occupations: Historian, curator, essayist, author, musician

Peter Charles Blecha is an American historian, curator, essayist, author, musician, and director of the Seattle-based Northwest Music Archives. He is primarily known for research related to aspects of Pacific Northwest musical history. In addition to his books, essays, and album liner notes, Blecha has also served in multiple consulting and curatorial positions.

== Early life ==
Blecha was raised in the Beacon Hill area of Seattle. His family moved to Olympia in 1962, and at an early age he took piano and drum lessons. After graduating from Winlock Miller High School, he returned to Seattle in 1974 to enroll at the University of Washington, studying art history under Constantine Chrisfofides, art under Jacob Lawrence, and Northwest Coast art under Bill Holm.

== Career ==
In the early 1970s, Blecha was active in the Olympia rock scene as a member of GodMother, Warbucks, and Valhalla, and later in Seattle with the Debbies, the Musical Chairs, conCordia disCors, and the Chains of Hell Orchestra.

In 1983, he formed the Northwest Music Archives to document record labels from the Pacific Northwest and began 17 years of writing the "Northwest Music Archives" column in Seattle's music magazine The Rocket.

The following year his exhibit, "The History of Northwest Recording", was mounted at the Seattle Public Library's main branch utilizing his own collection and items from recording engineer Kearney Barton. In 1987, he wrote and co-produced (with Mike Webb) a 10-hour special, "The History of Northwest Rock", for KVI radio, and in 1988 returned to the University of Washington to study museology. In 1990, Blecha began hosting the area's first all-Northwest oldies radio specialty show – "Tall Cool Ones" – on KCMU, and also served on the Northwest Area Music Association's Hall of Fame Committee.

In 1992, Blecha was hired as an archival consultant by Microsoft founder Paul Allen for a specific project: the Jimi Hendrix Museum, and served on the project's Planning and Design, Exhibit Development, and Concept Development teams. Over the following several years, the project's mission was expanded to include the Northwest's regional music history. Leading the curatorial department’s artifact acquisition effort, Blecha secured thousands of historic items while also conducting interviews with scores of rock stars and other music industry figures, earning a reputation as the "Indiana Jones of rock 'n' roll" and the "archaeologist of Northwest rock" for his work in locating important musical artifacts related to major rock artists and performances. The museum opened in June 2000 as the Experience Music Project (EMP), now the Museum of Pop Culture (MoPOP), with Blecha as a Senior Curator with three major inaugural exhibits: the "Jimi Hendrix Exhibit"; the "Northwest Passage Gallery" (about the history of Northwest music); and "Quest for Volume: A History of the Electric Guitar".

In the following years, Blecha served in volunteer positions with the Stone Age Institute Advisory Board, the Association for Recorded Sound Collections Excellence in Publication Committee, the Northwest African American Museum Advisory Committee, and the Joint Artists and Music Promotions Action Committee (JAMPAC). He was also named as an Ambassador for the Seattle Center Foundation's Next 50 history committee.

In 2001, Blecha began working for Walt Crowley's HistoryLink, an online encyclopedia of Washington state history. As of 2025, he continues to serve there as a Staff Historian and Contributing Editor, writing hundreds of essays about regional topics. He has published ten books and written feature essays for The Seattle Times, Seattle Business, Seattle Weekly, Seattle Metropolitan, Seattle Magazine, Life, No Depression, DISCoveries, and others.

Blecha researched historic brands of guitars manufactured in the Pacific Northwest from the 1930s through the 1950s including Audiovox, Bud-Electro, Hanburt, and Coppock, with many documented in essays in Vintage Guitar magazine. He also researched pioneering Northwest-based record companies from the 1940s (Linden, Morrison), 1950s (Dolton), and 1960s (Jerden, Etiquette, Camelot). In 2013, he launched the Northwest Music Archives website to document all known Pacific Northwest-based record labels and musical artists.

In 2023, Blecha was recruited by Humanities Washington to travel the state presenting regional music history lectures based on his book Stomp & Shout: R&B and the Origins of Northwest Rock and Roll. In 2024 and 2025, he appeared at numerous museums, historical societies, and public libraries, including Seattle’s Town Hall and the Washington State Historical Society. He also delivered the keynote address at the 2024 Phi Alpha Beta Northwest history honor society's conference in Spokane. In recent years he has donated artifacts to the Southwest Seattle Historical Society (Log House Museum) and served as a consultant for their new “Sound Spots” exhibit about local music history.

== Books ==
=== Author ===
- Blecha, Peter (1997). Wired Wood: The Origins of the Electric Guitar. Seattle: Experience Music Project.
- —————— (2004). Taboo Tunes: A History of Banned Bands & Censored Songs. Milwaukee: Backbeat. ISBN 978-0879307929.
- —————— (2005). The Taboo Tunes Songbook. Milwaukee: Hal Leonard. ISBN 978-0634089244.
- —————— (2005). Rock & Roll Archaeologist: How I Chased Down Kurt's Stratocaster, the 'Layla' Guitar, and Janis's Boa. Seattle: Sasquatch Books. ISBN 978-1570614439.
- —————— (2007). Music in Washington: Seattle and Beyond. Charleston: Arcadia. ISBN 978-1531629670.
- —————— (2009). SONIC BOOM! The History of Northwest Rock: From Louie Louie to Smells Like Teen Spirit. Milwaukee: Backbeat. ISBN 978-0879309466.
- —————— (2011). Jimi Hendrix, Guitar Hero (ebook). Seattle: Amazon. ASIN B005O31Y58.
- —————— (2017). Chateau Ste. Michelle Winery: The First 50 Years (1967-2017). Seattle: HistoryLink Documentary Media. ISBN 978-1933245478.
- —————— (2023). Stomp and Shout: R&B and the Origins of Northwest Rock and Roll. Seattle: University of Washington Press. ISBN 978-0295751252.
- —————— (2026). Music In Oregon: Portland and Beyond. Charleston: Arcadia. ISBN 978-1467163453.

=== Co-author ===
- Blecha, Peter; Oldham, Kit (2011). Rising Tides and Tailwinds: The History of the Port of Seattle. Seattle: University of Washington Press. ISBN 978-0295991313.
- Blecha, Peter; Holden, Brad (2022). Lost Roadhouses of Seattle. Charleston: The History Press. ISBN 978-1467150736.

== Other works ==
=== Articles and essays ===
Selected works from books, magazines and websites:

- Blecha, Peter (March 1999). "Audiovox Electronic Bass: Discovered! The World's First Electric Bass Guitar". Vintage Guitar. pp. 80–82.
- —————— (March 9, 2009). "Jini Dellaccio: The Northwest's Premier Rock 'n' Roll Photographer". HistoryLink.
- —————— (November 2009). "Coppock Guitars: Vintage Rarities from the Pacific Northwest". Vintage Guitar. pp. 48–49.
- —————— (December 17, 2011). "Invented in Seattle". Seattle Business.
- —————— (February 19, 2013). "Seattle's AFM Local 493 (1918-1958): 'Negro Musicians' Union'". HistoryLink.
- —————— (August 6, 2015). "Al Smith: Seattle's Preeminent African American Photographer". HistoryLink.
- —————— (September 18, 2015). "William "Chief" Arquette: The Puyallup Tribe's Star Musician". HistoryLink.
- —————— (November 4, 2016). "Dorothy Eustis: Seattle's Mysterious Piano Virtuoso". HistoryLink.
- —————— (November 8, 2016). "Merceedees: Seattle's 1950s Bluesy Piano Legend". HistoryLink.
- —————— (November 9, 2016). "Harry S. Stuff and the 1914 Seattle Origins of Alfred E. Neuman". HistoryLink.
- —————— (October 23, 2017). "Seattle's Film Row". HistoryLink.
- —————— (July 18, 2021). "Robert W. Patton: Seattle's Umbrella–Hat Man". HistoryLink.
- —————— (July 18, 2021). "Bob Hale: Seattle's Cartooning Weatherman". HistoryLink.

=== Documentaries ===
- Interview: Jimi Hendrix: By Those Who Knew Him Best (Chrome Dreams Productions, 2004)
- Interview: The Banned History of Rock & Roll (BBC Radio Scotland, 2006)
- Co-producer, writer: Music on East Madison Street: The Sound of Seattle (Ray-Blecha Productions, 2015)
- Interview: Bezango, WA (Austin Amandes Productions, 2015)
- Writer: Seattle: A History in Short Stories, (KBTC-TV, 2026)

=== Liner notes ===
Selected liner notes and booklets from major LP and CD releases:

- The Daily Flash: I Flash Daily (Psycho Records, 1985)
- Various: Nuggets Volume 8: The Northwest (Rhino Records, 1988)
- The Kingsmen: The Best of The Kingsmen (Rhino Records, 1989)
- The Sonics: Here Are The Ultimate Sonics (Etiquette Records, 1990)
- The Sonics: Maintaining My Cool (Jerden Records, 1991)
- The Sonics: Psycho-Sonics (Big Beat Records, 1993)
- Various: The History of Northwest Rock Vol. 1: The Original Northwest Sound, 1950s-1960s (Jerden Records, 1994)
- The Squirrels: Scrapin’ For Hits (Pop Lust Audio, 1996)
- Various: The History of Northwest Rock Vol. 2: The Garage Years (Jerden Records, 1999)
- Various: The History of Northwest Rock Vol. 3: Psychedelic Seattle (Jerden Records, 2000)
- Various: Battle of the Bands: Vol. 1, 1960s (Big Beat Records, 2001)
- Dave Lewis: The Godfather of Northwest Rock (Jerden Records, 2006)
- The Sonics: Busybody!!!: Live in Tacoma 1964 (Norton Records, 2007)
- Various: Rock ‘N Soul: Seattle Sounds of the 60s (Camelot Records, 2009)
- The Bumps: "Please Come Down" / "Baby Blue" (Freakout Records/Hockeytalker Records, 2017)

=== Music ===
Blecha's recordings include singles, EPs, and albums with multiple artists as a drummer, guitarist, and songwriter:

- Chains of Hell Orchestra: Doctor's Daughter (1982 album), Cairo's Ride (1982 album), Chaque Fois (1984 album), One Bad Trip (1984 12" EP)
- Shawn O'Neill and the Chains of Hell Orchestra: "Generations Past" on Sub Pop 7 (1982 VA album)
- Steve Fisk: Kiss This Day Goodbye (1983 album)
- ME: "Scorpio Moon" / "And Now You" (1985 7" single)

=== Lectures ===
Selected lectures and topics:

- "Seattle’s New Music Museum: The Experience Music Project", The Sheldon Concert Hall, St. Louis. MO, September 16, 1999
- "Quest for Volume: A History of the Electric Guitar", Glenn A. Black Laboratory Lecture Hall, University of Indiana, September 18, 1999
- "The Black Roots of the Original Northwest Rock Sound", University of Washington School of Music Conference: "Around the Sound: Popular Music in Performance, Education and Scholarship" (catalog, pp. 83–85), 2000
- "The History of Country Music in Oregon", Bagdad Theatre, Portland, October 26, 2012
- "The Lost Roadhouses of Seattle", Southwest Seattle Historical Society, February 9, 2023,
- "Stomp & Shout! The Untold Saga of the Origins of Northwest Rock", Town Hall Seattle, April 19, 2023

== Personal life ==
Blecha resides in the Seattle area with his wife, Kate Race, an artist, musician, and graphic designer.
