= Woman in Love (disambiguation) =

"Woman in Love" is a song by Barbra Streisand from her 1980 album Guilty.

Woman in Love may also refer to:

- "A Woman in Love", a song by Frank Loesser for the 1955 cinematic adaptation of the Broadway musical Guys and Dolls
- "Woman in Love" (Three Degrees song), a 1979 song by Three Degrees
- "A Woman in Love (It's Not Me)", a song by Tom Petty and the Heartbreakers from the 1981 album Hard Promises
- "A Woman in Love" (Ronnie Milsap song), a song by Ronnie Milsap from the 1989 album Stranger Things Have Happened
- A Woman in Love (Bonnie Guitar song), 1967

== See also ==
- Just Another Woman in Love, 1984 song by Anne Murray
- Women in Love (disambiguation)
