= Jerden =

Jerden may refer to:

- Dave Jerden (1949–2025), American record producer, audio engineer and mixer
- Jerden Records, a former record label based in Seattle
