= Stop the Sun =

Single by Bonnie Guitar

from the album Stop the Sun/A Woman in Love
- B-side: "Wings of a Dove"
- Released: November 1967
- Recorded: September 1967; Hollywood, California, U.S.
- Genre: Country, Nashville Sound
- Label: Dot
- Songwriter: Bonnie Guitar
- Producers: Bonnie Guitar, George Richey

Bonnie Guitar singles chronology
"A Woman in Love" (1967)	"Stop the Sun" (1967)	"I Believe in Love" (1968)

"Stop the Sun" is a song written and recorded by American country artist, Bonnie Guitar. Recorded in September 1967, the official single was released two months later, peaking at number thirteen on the Billboard Hot Country Singles chart. It was the first time Guitar enjoyed a major hit with a self-penned song. The song was issued on her album, Stop the Sun/A Woman in Love on Dot Records.

== Chart performance ==
Chart (1967–1968)	Peak position
U.S. Billboard Hot Country Singles	13
