= Women in Love (disambiguation) =

Women in Love is a 1920 novel by D. H. Lawrence.

Women in Love may also refer to:

== Film ==
- Women in Love (film), a 1969 film adaptation of Lawrence's novel
- Feng shui er shi nian (1983), or Women in Love, a Hong Kong-Taiwanese film written and directed by Chia Chang Liu

== Music ==
- "Women in Love", a song from the 1979 album Van Halen II

== Television ==
- Women in Love (telenovela), a Brazilian telenovela
- Women in Love (TV series), a 2011 British two-part television film by William Ivory

== See also ==
- Woman in Love (disambiguation)
