= Get Your Lie the Way You Want It =

Single by Bonnie Guitar

from the album Miss Bonnie Guitar
- B-side: "Would You Believe"
- Released: June 1966
- Recorded: January 1966; Hollywood, California, U.S.
- Genre: Country, Nashville Sound
- Label: Dot
- Songwriter: Billy Mize
- Producers: Bonnie Guitar, George Richey

Bonnie Guitar singles chronology
"I'm Living in Two Worlds" (1965)	"Get Your Lie the Way You Want It" (1966)	"The Tallest Tree" (1966)

"Get Your Lie the Way You Want It"' is a song written by Billy Mize, which was recorded by American country artist Bonnie Guitar. The song was released as a single in June 1966 and peaked at number fourteen on the Billboard Magazine Hot Country Singles chart. "Get Your Lie the Way You Want It" became Guitar's fourth major hit as a musical artist. It was later released on Guitar's 1966 album entitled, Miss Bonnie Guitar on Dot Records.

== Chart performance ==
Chart (1966)	Peak position
U.S. Billboard Hot Country Singles	14
