= Mister Fire Eyes =

Single by Bonnie Guitar
- B-side: "There's a New Moon Over My Shoulder"
- Released: July 1957
- Recorded: April 1957; Hollywood, California, U.S.
- Genre: Country
- Label: Dot Records
- Songwriters: Bonnie Guitar, Ned Miller
- Producer: Fabor Robison

Bonnie Guitar singles chronology
"Half Your Heart" (1957)	"Mister Fire Eyes" (1957)	"I Saw Your Face in the Moon" (1957)

"Mister Fire Eyes" is a song written by Ned Miller and Bonnie Guitar. It was released as a single by Bonnie Guitar in July 1957. The single became her second major hit as a music artist, peaking at #15 on the Billboard Magazine Hot Country Singles chart and #71 on the Billboard Hot 100. "Mister Fire Eyes" was not initially released on a formal record album.

== Chart performance ==
Chart (1957)	Peak position
U.S. Billboard Hot Country Singles	15
U.S. Billboard Hot 100	71
