= Kearney Barton =

- Born: December 29, 1931; Oregon, Missouri, United States
- Died: January 17, 2012 (aged 80)
- Occupations: Recording engineer, record producer

Kearney Whitsell Barton (December 29, 1931 – January 17, 2012) was an American record producer active in Seattle, Washington, from the 1950s to the 2000s. Particularly known for his 1950s and 1960s-era recordings of garage rock bands, Barton recorded many Pacific Northwest musicians such as The Fleetwoods, The Ventures, The Wailers, The Sonics, The Frantics, The Kingsmen, Quincy Jones, Ann and Nancy Wilson, Bonnie Guitar, and Dave Lewis.

== Biography ==
Barton was born in Missouri, and moved with his family to Seattle in 1945. After dropping out of the University of Washington School of Drama in 1949, Barton began working in radio, acquiring his own show, Professor Barton's Album of Fine Music, on Seattle-based KTW. In early 1958, Barton was hired at KNBX as an engineer, and soon after Barton renamed the station Northwest Recorders and began leasing the studio for his own productions. One of Barton's early contracts at the new studio was with Dolton Records, for whom Barton recorded, among others, Bonnie Guitar and The Fleetwoods. Barton was the engineer of the Fleetwood's number-one hit "Mr. Blue". Around this time Barton also recorded groups such as The Wailers, The Frantics, and The Ventures. Barton did some sessions for local label Topaz Records (including Little Bill's version of "Louie Louie"), and the label's financial debt to the studio ended in Barton's receiving ownership of it.

In 1961, Barton moved to a new studio and founded a new recording company, called Audio Recording, Inc., and again to another, larger studio in 1965. He continued recording garage bands local to the Northwest, including The Sonics and The Kingsmen. The success of the Sonics led bands such as The Knickerbockers and The Standells to record with Barton. Barton also recorded local funk musicians such as the Black On White Affair, who were reissued on Light in the Attic Records' compilation, Wheedle's Groove. The Young Fresh Fellows, seeking a 1960s-era vintage sound, recorded with Barton in the 1990s.

Barton recorded into the 2000s, continuing to use vintage equipment such as Neumann vacuum-tube microphones due to their characteristic sound quality. In 2009, Light in the Attic released a newly recorded album of Seattle-area funk musicians who played under the name Wheedle's Groove; the album was entitled Kearney Barton in tribute to him. Norton Records also reissued some of Barton's productions and drew attention to his work in the 2000s. Barton fell ill and moved to a care facility in 2011, and died in January 2012. The studio contents of Barton's home, which held more than 7,000 open-reel tapes, were partly preserved by the University of Washington. In 2020, Light in the Attic issued a compilation of music produced by Barton, culled from the University of Washington archives. The compilation is entitled Kearney Barton: Architect of the Northwest Sound.
