= The Jolly Green Giant =

Single by The Kingsmen

from the album The Kingsmen Volume 3
- B-side: "Long Green"
- Released: December 1964
- Genre: Garage rock, novelty
- Length: 1:56
- Label: Wand
- Songwriters: Lynn Easton, Don Harris, Dewey Terry
- Producer: Jerry Dennon

The Kingsmen singles chronology
"Death of an Angel" (1964)	"The Jolly Green Giant" (1964)	"The Climb" (1965)

"The Jolly Green Giant" is a song written by Lynn Easton, Don Harris, and Dewey Terry and performed by the Kingsmen. It reached No. 1 on the Canadian chart, No. 4 on the U.S. Pop chart, and No. 25 on the U.S. R&B chart in 1965. The song is the only single from their 1965 album The Kingsmen Volume 3. It is based on the Green Giant food brand's mascot the Jolly Green Giant. The single originally only credited Easton as the writer, but Harris and Terry were later added when it was determined the song was a re-write of the Olympics song "Big Boy Pete".

It was arranged by the Kingsmen, produced by Jerry Dennon, and ranked No. 39 on Billboard magazine's Top 100 singles of 1965.

== Other versions ==
- Sandy Nelson, on his 1965 album Drum Discotheque.
- The Ravens, as the B-side to their 1965 single "Listen to Me Now".
- The Royal Guardsmen, on their 1967 album Snoopy vs. the Red Baron.
- Don and the Goodtimes, on their 1995 compilation album Don & the Goodtimes.
- The Knickerbockers, on their 1998 compilation album The Very Best of the Knickerbockers: Lies.
- Several other 1965 versions with uncredited groups were released on various "hit parade" labels including Hit, Hit Parader, and Seeburg Rec-O-Dance.
