= I'm Living in Two Worlds =

Single by Bonnie Guitar

from the album Two Worlds
- B-side: "Good Time Charlie"
- Released: December 1965
- Recorded: November 1965; Hollywood, California, United States
- Genre: Country, Nashville Sound
- Label: Dot Records
- Songwriter(s): Jan Crutchfield
- Producer(s): Bonnie Guitar, George Richey

Bonnie Guitar singles chronology
"The Outside Looking In" (1964)	"I'm Living in Two Worlds" (1965)	"Get Your Lie the Way You Want It" (1966)

"I'm Living in Two Worlds" is a song written by Jan Crutchfield, which was recorded and released by American country artist Bonnie Guitar. The song reached number nine on the Billboard Hot Country Singles chart and number ninety-nine on the Billboard Hot 100 in early 1966. "I'm Living in Two Worlds" became Guitar's first Country top-ten single and her first charting single since 1959. The song was popular among other female country vocalists and covered on albums by Kitty Wells, Loretta Lynn, Wilma Burgess, Skeeter Davis, and Jan Howard.

The single helped officially introduce Guitar to the country music market, setting the trend for a series of country music singles.

== Chart performance ==
Chart (1965–66)	Peak position
U.S. Billboard Hot Country Singles	9
U.S. Billboard Hot 100	99
