= The Kingsmen =

1960s American rock band

- 1963 "Louie Louie" lineup. L-R: Don Gallucci, Jack Ely, Lynn Easton, Mike Mitchell, Bob Nordby.

Background information
- Origin: Portland, Oregon, United States
- Genres: Proto-punk; rock and roll; garage rock
- Years active: 1959–present
- Labels: Jerden, Wand, Sundazed, Vogue Schallplatten
- Spinoffs: Don and the Goodtimes, Jack Ely and the Courtmen, Touch
- Members: Dick Peterson; Kim Nicklaus; Steve Peterson; Todd McPherson; Dennis Mitchell; Marc Willett
- Past members: Mike Mitchell; Lynn Easton; Jack Ely; Bob Nordby; Don Gallucci; Gary Abbott; Norm Sundholm; Barry Curtis; Kerry Magness; J.C. Reick; Turley Richards; Pete Borg; Jeff Beals; Steve Friedson; Fred Dennis; Andy Parypa
- Website: louielouie.org

The Kingsmen are a 1960s American rock band from Portland, Oregon. They are best known for their 1963 recording of R&B singer Richard Berry's "Louie Louie", which held the No. 2 spot on the Billboard charts for six weeks and has become an enduring classic.

In total, the Kingsmen charted 13 singles from 1963 to 1968 and five consecutive albums from 1963 to 1966. Their first album, The Kingsmen in Person, remained on the Billboard Top LPs chart for 131 weeks from January 1964 to August 1966. Their early albums were released internationally in Canada, the UK, France, Germany, Mexico, South Africa, and Taiwan.

== Early years ==
Lynn Easton and Jack Ely started performing at an early age in local newspaper-sponsored revues with the Journal Juniors and the Young Oregonians, respectively. In 1957, they started performing together, with Ely singing and playing guitar and Easton on the drum kit. The two teenagers had grown up together, as their parents were close friends. Easton and Ely performed at local parties and events, and soon added Mike Mitchell on guitar and Bob Nordby on bass to round out the band. They called themselves the Kingsmen, taking the name from a recently disbanded group. The band began playing at fashion shows, Red Cross events, and supermarket promotions, generally avoiding rock songs on their setlist. In 1962, Don Gallucci, a high school freshman at the time, was recruited from another local group, the Royal Notes, to play keyboards. Their first recording effort was an unreleased acetate of an instrumental titled "Peter Gunn Rock". (Note: Based on the Wailers "Gunnin' for Peter", in turn based on Henry Mancini's Peter Gunn theme. Rerecorded versions appeared on The Kingsmen on Campus (1965) and House Party (1980) as "Peter Gunn".)

== "Louie Louie" ==
In 1962, while playing a gig at the Pypo Club in Seaside, Oregon, the band noticed the entire club dancing for hours on end to Rockin' Robin Roberts's version of "Louie Louie" being played on the jukebox. Ely convinced his fellow band members to learn the song, which they played at dances to a great crowd response. Unknown to him, he had changed the beat because he'd misheard it on a jukebox. Ken Chase, host of radio station KISN, opened his own club, "The Chase", to capitalize on these dance crazes. The Kingsmen became the club's house band, and he became the band's manager. On Friday, April 5, 1963, Chase booked the band an hour-long session at the local Northwestern Inc., studio for 10 a.m. the following day to record a demo tape for a summer cruise ship gig. Adding to the hurried atmosphere, the band had just played a 90-minute "Louie Louie" marathon the night before. (Note: On July 2, 1993, a bronze historical marker was installed at the site (411 SW 13th Avenue) by the Oregon Historical Society to commemorate the event. The marker disappeared shortly afterward. On September 5, 2013, the City of Portland dedicated a replacement plaque at the site. It was removed in 2015 after vandalism and theft attempts.)

Despite the band's annoyance at having so little time to prepare, the Kingsmen walked into the three-microphone recording studio on time. "Jamaica Farewell", one partial and one full take of "Louie Louie", and "Haunted Castle" were recorded. For "Louie Louie", the only vocal number, Ely was forced to lean back and sing to a microphone suspended from the ceiling. "It was more yelling than singing", Ely said, "'cause I was trying to be heard over all the instruments." In addition, he was wearing braces at the time of the performance, further compounding his slurred words. Ely sang the beginning of the third verse two bars too early, but realized his mistake and waited for the rest of the band to catch up. The Kingsmen were not proud of the recording and wanted to fix their mistakes, but Chase liked the energy and rawness and assured them that the demo version could be redone before a record was released. The one hour session cost either $36, $50, or somewhere in between, and the band split the cost.

With a competing "Louie Louie" version from Paul Revere and the Raiders getting heavy play on a competing station, Chase began playing the Kingsmen's demo version on his show at KISN. He then contracted with Jerry Dennon's Jerden Records to press a single. The B-side was "Haunted Castle", composed by Ely and Don Gallucci, the new keyboardist; however, Lynn Easton was credited on both the Jerden and Wand releases.

"Louie Louie" reached No. 1 on the Cashbox and Music Vendor charts and No. 2 on the Billboard Hot 100 chart. Additionally, it reached No. 1 on the CHUM Canada chart, and in the UK it reached No. 26 on the Record Retailer chart. It sold over one million copies and was awarded a gold disc.

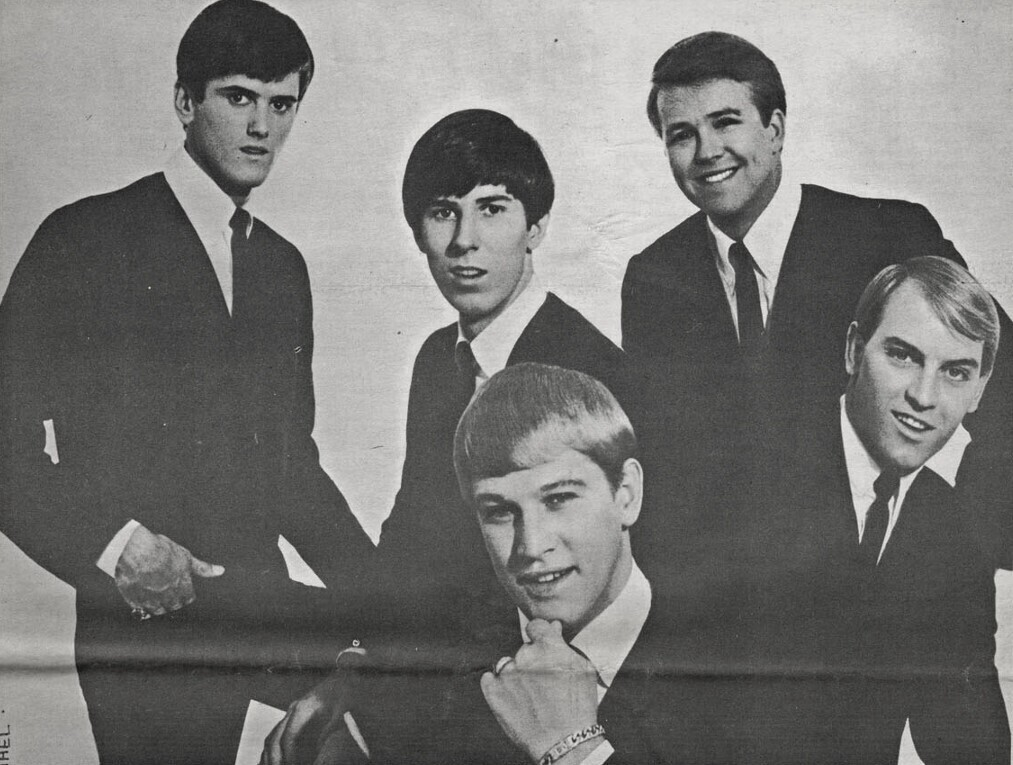
The Kingsmen in early 1966: Mike Mitchell, Dick Peterson, Norm Sundholm, Barry Curtis, Lynn Easton (front).

The band attracted nationwide attention when "Louie Louie" was banned by the governor of Indiana, Matthew E. Welsh, also attracting the attention of the FBI and FCC because of alleged indecent lyrics in their version of the song. The lyrics were, in fact, innocent, but Ely's baffling enunciation permitted teenage fans and concerned parents alike to imagine the most scandalous obscenities. (Ironically, the FBI totally missed Lynn Easton yelling "Fuck!" at 0:54 after fumbling a drum fill.) All of this attention only made the song more popular. In April 1966 "Louie Louie" was reissued and once again hit the music charts, reaching No. 65 on the Cashbox chart and No. 97 on the Billboard Hot 100 chart.

In 1985, Ross Shafer, host and a writer-performer of the late-night comedy series Almost Live! on the Seattle TV station KING, spearheaded an effort to have "Louie Louie" replace "Washington, My Home" by Helen Davis as Washington's official state song. Picking up on this initially prankish effort, Whatcom County Councilman Craig Cole introduced Resolution No. 85–12 in the state legislature, citing the need for a "contemporary theme song that can be used to engender a sense of pride and community, and in the enhancement of tourism and economic development". His resolution also called for the creation of a new "Louie Louie County". While the House did not pass it, the Senate's Resolution 1985-37 declared April 12, 1985, "Louie Louie Day". A crowd of 4,000, estimated by press reports, convened at the state capitol that day for speeches, singalongs, and performances by the Wailers, the Kingsmen, and Paul Revere and the Raiders. Two days later, a Seattle event commemorated the occasion with the premiere performance of a new, Washington-centric version of the song written by composer Berry.

Other Kingsmen "Louie Louie" versions with either Lynn Easton or Dick Peterson as lead vocalist appeared on Live & Unreleased (recorded 1963, released 1992), Live at the Castle (recorded 1964, released 2011), Shindig! Presents Frat Party (VHS, recorded 1965, released 1991), 60s Dance Party (1982), California Cooler Presents Cooler Hits (recorded 1986, released 1987), The Louie Louie Collection (as the Mystery Band, 1994), Red, White & Rock (2002), Garage Sale (recorded 2002, released 2003), and My Music: '60s Pop, Rock & Soul (DVD, 2011). Peterson also released a solo version on the 1999 Circle of Friends, Volume 1 CD.

Over the years the Kingsmen's version of "Louie Louie" has been recognized by organizations and publications worldwide for its influence on the history of rock and roll. Rankings and recognition in major publications and surveys are shown in the table below.

Source	Poll/Survey	Year	Rank
Rock & Roll Hall of Fame	Hall of Fame Singles	2018	None
Rock & Roll Hall of Fame	Songs That Shaped Rock and Roll	1995	None
National Academy of Recording Arts and Sciences	Grammy Hall of Fame	1999	None
National Public Radio	The 300 Most Important American Records of the 20th Century	1999	None
Smash Hits, James E. Perone	The 100 Songs That Defined America	2016	None
The Wire	The 100 Most Important Records Ever Made	1992	None
Mojo	Ultimate Jukebox: The 100 Singles You Must Own	2003	No. 1
The Ultimate Playlist, Robert Webb	The 100 Greatest Cover Versions	2012	No. 1
Paste	The 50 Best Garage Rock Songs of All Time	2014	No. 3
Rolling Stone	40 Songs That Changed The World	2007	No. 5
All Time Top 1000 Albums, Colin Larkin	The All-Time Top 100 Singles	2000	No. 6
VH1	100 Greatest Songs of Rock and Roll	2000	No. 11
The Heart of Rock and Soul, Dave Marsh	The 1001 Greatest Singles Ever Made	1989	No. 11
Rolling Stone	The 100 Best Singles of the Last 25 Years	1989	No. 18
Los Angeles	LA's Top 100	2001	No. 19
Rock and Roll, Paul Williams	The 100 Best Singles	1993	No. 22
VH1	100 Greatest Dance Songs	2000	No. 27
Mojo	100 Greatest Singles of All Time	1997	No. 51
Rolling Stone	The 500 Greatest Songs of All Time	2010	No. 54
Rolling Stone	The 500 Greatest Songs of All Time	2004	No. 55
NEA and RIAA	Songs of the Century	1999	No. 57
Mojo	Big Bangs: 100 Records That Changed The World	2007	No. 70
Pitchfork	The 200 Best Songs of the 1960s	2006	No. 154
Rolling Stone	The 500 Greatest Songs of All Time	2021	No. 156
NME	The 500 Greatest Songs of All Time	2014	No. 157
WCBS-FM	Top 1001 Songs of the Century	2005	No. 184

== History ==
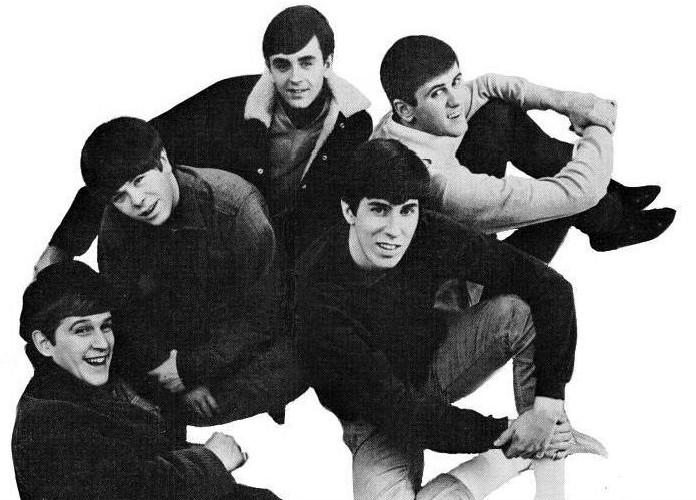
The Kingsmen in late 1966. Clockwise from lower left: Lynn Easton, J.C. Rieck, Kerry Magness, Mike Mitchell, Dick Peterson

Before the success of "Louie Louie", the members of the Kingsmen had taken varied paths. Easton, whose mother had registered the name of the group and therefore owned it, declared that from this point on he intended to be the singer asserting, "It's my band because I own the name", and forcing Ely to play the drums. This led Ely and Nordby to quit the group in 1963, and Gary Abbott and Norm Sundholm were added to play drums and bass, respectively. (The liner notes for the first album, The Kingsmen In Person, presented an abridged history with no mention of Ely or Nordby and with Easton as the group’s sole founder and creative force.)

Don Gallucci was forced out because he was not old enough to tour and later formed Don and the Goodtimes, which morphed into the short-lived Touch. Later, Gallucci became a record producer with Elektra Records, with his most famous production being the Stooges' seminal second album Fun House.

The two remaining original Kingsmen, Lynn Easton and Mike Mitchell, were joined by Gary Abbott, Barry Curtis and Norm Sundholm to record their first album and tour as the official band. Dick Peterson (not Dickie Peterson) replaced Gary Abbott shortly thereafter. This line-up stayed intact from 1964 into 1966 and charted multiple singles and albums with Easton as the principal vocalist.

After Ely's departure and considerable chart success by the new line-up, the group learned that he was performing with another group as The Kingsmen. Following legal action, a settlement was reached and Easton, Mitchell, Peterson, Curtis and Sundholm established their rights to the "Kingsmen" name. Thus, Ely was forced to stop using the name, Easton could no longer lip sync to Ely's vocals, and subsequent releases of "Louie Louie" were required to have the text "Lead vocal by Jack Ely" below the title. Unable to perform using the Kingsmen name, Ely continued with his groups the Squires and the Courtmen. He also received a gold record for "Louie Louie" as part of the settlement.

The Kingsmen's 1964 follow up to "Louie Louie" was a party version of "Money (That's What I Want)" which hit the Billboard Hot 100 at No. 16 and on Cashbox at No. 17. Then came "Little Latin Lupe Lu" peaking on Billboard at No. 46 and Cashbox at No. 49. After that it was "Death of An Angel" No. 33 on Cashbox and No. 42 on Billboard.

After starting 1965 with their own float in the Rose Bowl Parade, the Kingsmen returned to the Top 10 nationally with "The Jolly Green Giant" reaching No. 4 on Billboard and No. 8 on Cashbox. The novelty number also made No. 25 on the Billboard R&B chart and hit No. 1 on the RPM Canada chart. (Note: As reported in Record World, the Kingsmen considered a "Jolly Green Giant" sequel, "The Race Is On" written by Scepter-Wand exec Pete Garris, about the giant pursuing Annie Fanny who was married to Mohair Sam, but no recording was made.) The follow-up song was "The Climb", No. 45 on Cashbox and No. 65 on Billboard. "Annie Fanny" was released next reaching No. 43 on Cashbox and No. 47 on Billboard. Next came "(You Got) The Gamma Goochee", No. 98 on Cashbox and No. 122 on Billboard. The group also appeared in the beach party movie How to Stuff a Wild Bikini singing "Give Her Lovin'" (released as a B-side to "Annie Fanny") which appeared on the soundtrack album along with their recording of the title song.

In 1966 the Kingsmen continued to hit the charts with "Killer Joe" reaching No. 77 on Billboard and No. 81 on Cashbox. Their original recording of "Louie Louie" was re-released as "Louie Louie 64-65-66" and re-entered the Billboard, Cash Box, and Record World charts. They also released a promotional item, a "picture-sleeve-clad potato-chip ad jingle 45" titled "The Krunch", their only picture sleeve single, which did not chart.

1966 also saw two Kingsmen departures: Barry Curtis was drafted and Norm Sundholm opted to work full time for Sunn amplifiers, a business he had started in 1964 with his brother Conrad. Replacements were J.C. Rieck on keyboards (until Curtis's return) and Kerry Magness (followed by Pete Borg and Jeff Beals) on bass.

In 1967 they made the charts for the last time with "Bo Diddley Bach" reaching No. 128 on Billboard, and in July founding member Lynn Easton left the group. He worked for an advertising firm and hosted this is IT, a "bandstand-type" show for Portland television station KGW. Singer Turley Richards was brought in as Easton's replacement, but he departed later that same year.

In 1968 with the original group on a recording and touring hiatus, the Kingsmen's management team worked with the Kasenetz-Katz production organization and studio musicians to release a single on the Earth label ("Feed Me"/"Just A 'B' Side"). A separate lineup was formed with new members (including lead singer Yank Barry) to tour for a time during 1968–1969 on the East Coast of the United States while the main lineup of the band was inactive.

In 1973 the reactivated group signed with Capitol and released one single which did not chart.

In addition to Jack Ely's groups and re-recordings, several of the Kingsmen pursued other solo projects. Dick Peterson and Barry Curtis as The Other Two released two singles in 1966, and Lynn Easton re-recorded "The Jolly Green Giant" in 1976.

In 1977, Peterson, Mitchell, and Curtis formed California, an "America-type" soft rock group. Peterson as Dick St. Nicklaus released two albums, Magic (1979) and Sweet and Dandy (1980), and multiple singles. In 2002, Barry Curtis and Steve Peterson joined the revived line-up of The Daily Flash.

In 1983, the group successfully sued K-tel over the release of the 1982 60's Dance Party album because it featured a 1976 Jack Ely re-recording of "Louie Louie" billed as by "The Kingsmen" and displayed the text "These selections are rerecordings by the original artists" on the back cover. K-tel had also similarly marketed the Lynn Easton re-recording of "The Jolly Green Giant".

Also in 1983, a music video, The Kingsmen – Live at Delta House, aired on MTV. Directed by David Jester, the video recreated the raucous, toga party atmosphere popularized in National Lampoon's Animal House using the "Delta House" on the University of Oregon campus. Bassist Fred Dennis was featured as the lead vocalist.

In 1993, members of the group brought legal action against Gusto Records to have all of their original recordings returned. Gusto had acquired the Kingsmen song rights from Springboard International Records, Inc., who had purchased the entire Scepter-Wand catalog in 1977 after Florence Greenberg's retirement, but the group had not been paid royalties since 1968. In 1998, the Kingsmen were awarded ownership of all their early recordings, including "Louie Louie".

When Jack Ely died on April 28, 2015, obituaries were published by the Associated Press, Time, Washington Post, New York Times, The Times, and others. Critic Dave Marsh said that Ely's vocal made the Kingsmen's "Louie Louie" "...the classic that it is." Lynn Easton died on April 24, 2020.

Mike Mitchell died on April 16, 2021, on his 77th birthday. At the time of his death, he was the only remaining member of the Kingsmen's original lineup who still performed with the band. His "Louie Louie" guitar break has been called "iconic", "blistering", and "one of the most famous guitar solos of all time". Guitar Player magazine noted, "Raw, lightning-fast, and loud, the solo's unbridled energy helped make the song a No. 2 pop hit, but also helped set the template for garage-rock – and later hard-rock – guitar."

As of 2026, Bob Nordby and Don Gallucci are the last surviving members of the "Louie Louie" line-up.

== Members ==
=== Current ===
- Dick Peterson – drums, vocals (1963–present)
- Steve Peterson – guitar, vocals (1988–present)
- Kim Nicklaus – keyboards (1982–1984, 2000–present)
- Todd McPherson – bass, guitar, vocals (1992–present)
- Dennis Mitchell – guitar, vocals (2006–present)
- Marc Willett – bass (1984–1992), (2021–present)

=== Former ===
- Mike Mitchell – vocals, guitar (1959–2021; died 2021)
- Lynn Easton – vocals, drums, saxophone (1959–1967; died 2020)
- Jack Ely – vocals, guitar (1959–1963; died 2015)
- Bob Nordby – bass (1959–1963)
- Don Gallucci – keyboards (1962–1963)
- Gary Abbott – drums (1963; died 2015)
- Norm Sundholm – bass (1963–1967)
- Barry Curtis – keyboards, guitar (1963–2005)
- Kerry Magness – bass (1966–1967; died 2004)
- J.C. Rieck – keyboards, vocals (1966–1967; died 2019)
- Turley Richards – vocals, guitar (1967)
- Pete Borg – bass (1967–1969; died 2010)
- Jeff Beals – bass (1967; died 2016)
- Steve Friedson – keyboards (1967–1973)
- Yank Barry – vocals (1968–1969)
- Fred Dennis – bass (1972–1984)
- Andy Parypa – bass (1982–1984)

== Discography ==
U.S. albums and singles, plus major compilation releases and appearances on 1960s various artist compilations.

=== Studio albums ===
Listed in chronological order with peak chart positions (Billboard/Cashbox) noted.

- The Kingsmen in Person (Wand WDM/WDS-657) 1963 (No. 20/No. 16) (Note: LP release features the Easton, Mitchell, Sundholm, Gallucci, Abbott "B" line-up except for "Louie Louie" and "Haunted Castle" (CD bonus track), which feature the earlier Easton, Ely, Mitchell, Nordby, Gallucci "A" line-up.)
- The Kingsmen Volume II (Wand WDM/WDS-659) 1964 (No. 15/No. 20) (Note: LP release features the Easton, Mitchell, Sundholm, Curtis, Peterson "C" line-up.)
- The Kingsmen Volume 3 (Wand WDM/WDS-662) 1965 (No. 22/No. 10)
- The Kingsmen on Campus (Wand WDM/WDS-670) 1965 (No. 68/No. 53)
- 15 Great Hits (Wand WDM/WDS-674) 1966 (No. 87/–) (Note: LP release features a mix of the "B" line-up on two songs, the "C" line-up on five songs, and the "D" line-up (Easton, Mitchell, Sudholm, Peterson, Rieck) on eight songs.)
- Up and Away (Wand WDM/WDS-675) 1966 (Note: LP release features a mix of the "E" line-up (Easton, Mitchell, Peterson, Rieck, Beals) on nine songs, the "F" line-up (Mitchell, Peterson) on three songs, and the "G" line-up (Mitchell, Peterson, Rieck, Beals) on one song.)

=== Live albums ===
- Plugged (Kingsmen CD 1) 1995 (Note: Features the Mitchell, McPherson, Curtis, Peterson, Peterson line-up with Willett on one song in place of McPherson. Live cuts from performances in Oregon and Washington. All from 1994 except "Rumble" from 1988.)
- Garage Sale (Louie Louie Records) 2003

=== Releases of earlier material ===
- Louie Louie – Live & Unreleased (Jerden 7004) recorded 1963, released 1992 (Note: Unused tracks from live performance tapes recorded November 15–16, 1963 at The Chase nightclub for The Kingsmen In Person. All songs previously unreleased versions.)
- Since We've Been Gone (Sundazed 6027) recorded 1967, released 1994
- Live At The Castle (digital only) recorded 1964, released 2011 (Note: All tracks recorded live August 24, 1964, at The Spanish Castle nightclub. Includes previously unreleased live version of "Louie Louie". Initially released on Spotify.com.)

=== Compilation albums ===
- The Kingsmen Greatest Hits (Wand WDM/WDS-681) 1967
- The Best of the Kingsmen (Scepter/Citation Series CTN-18002) 1972
- A Quarter to Three (Picc-A-Dilly PIC-3329) 1980 (Note: First five tracks from 15 Great Hits, remainder from Up and Away.)
- Ya Ya (Picc-A-Dilly PIC-3330) 1980 (Note: A compilation of tracks taken from various albums, with only "Ya Ya" and "Lip Service" previously unreleased.)
- House Party (Picc-A-Dilly PIC-3346) 1980 (Note: Track list includes three previously unreleased songs ("Busy Body", "Willy Nilly", "Slow Down"), two alternate versions ("Night Train", "Under My Thumb"), and six previously released songs.)
- The Kingsmen Greatest Hits (Picc-A-Dilly PIC-3348) 1981 (Note: All tracks previously released with the exception of an alternate version of "Little Green Thing".)
- The Best of the Kingsmen (Rhino RNLP 126) 1985
- Rock & Roll – Kingsmen (Starday N5-2125) 1985
- Louie Louie – The Kingsmen (Prime Cuts 1322) 1986
- The Kingsmen – 12 Greatest (Golden Circle CS 57582) 198?
- The Kingsmen – Louie, Louie (Golden Circle GC57881) 1987
- The Jolly Green Giant (Richmond 2125) 1988
- The Kingsmen – Louie Louie (Highland Music/Richmond 2138) 1988
- The Best of the Kingsmen (Rhino 70745) 1989
- The Kingsmen – Louie Louie and More Golden Classics (Collectables 5073) 1991
- The Kingsmen – 20 Greats (Highland Music/Festival FST FCD 4417) 1991
- The World of the Kingsmen/Louie Louie (Trace 0400612) 1992
- Louie Louie 1994
- The Best of the Kingsmen (Laserlight/Delta 124 24) 1995
- The Very Best of the Kingsmen (Varèse Sarabande/Varèse Vintage 5905) 1998
- The Kingsmen's Greatest Hits (K-tel K4185-2) 1998
- Louie Louie: The Very Best of the Kingsmen (Collectables 5628) 1999
- The Kingsmen – America's Premier 60s Garage Band (Edel America 70172) 2000
- The Kingsmen – Gold (N'Dagroove Records NDA5331) 2012
- The Kingsmen – Louie Louie and Other Great Hits (Goodtime B093RPTKG2) 2021 (Note: Initially released on Bandcamp.com)

=== EPs ===
International releases in Brazil, France, Spain, and U.K. (Note: Brazil; Philips DC 330.025 ("Louie Louie", "Little Latin Lupe Lu", "Haunted Castle", "David's Mood"), 1964; France; Vogue EPL 8172 ("Louie Louie", "Haunted Castle") + ("Blast Off to Love" & "A Little Bit of Everything" by Jocko Henderson), 1964; Vogue EPL 8209 ("Money", "The Waiting", "Long Tall Texan", "Mojo Workout"), 1964; Vogue EPL 8273 ("Little Latin Lupe Lu", "David's Mood", "Searchin' for Love", "Death of an Angel"), 1965; Vogue EPL 18015 ("The Climb", "Comin' Home Baby", "Long Green", "The Jolly Green Giant"), 1965; Vogue EPL 18025 ("How to Stuff a Wild Bikini", "Give Her Lovin'", "Annie Fanny", "Don't You Just Know It), 1965; Vogue EPL 18065 ("You Got) The Gamma Goochee", "De Boom Le Boom", "It's Only The Dog", "Rosalie", 1966; Spain; Fontana 466 802 TE ("Louie Louie", "Money", "Twist and Shout", "You Can't Sit Down"), 1964; United Kingdom; Pye International NEP 44023 ("Louie Louie", "Haunted Castle", "Money", "Bent Scepter"), 1964; Pye International NEP 44040 ("Mojo Workout", "You Can't Sit Down", "Long Tall Texan", "Night Train"), 1965; Pye International NEP 44063 ("Fever", "Mashed Potatoes", "Twist & Shout", "The Waiting"), 1966)

=== Singles ===
Year	Song titles	Peak chart positions							Label	Album
Year	Song titles	Billboard Hot 100	Cashbox Top 100	Billboard R&B	Cashbox R&B 50	Record World (Note: Music Vendor until mid-1964.)	Canada (Note: CHUM chart 1963-1964. RPM chart 1965 and later.)	U.K.	Label	Album
1963	"Louie Louie" (Berry) b/w "Haunted Castle" (Easton) (Note: Written by Jack Ely and Don Gallucci, but credited to Lynn Easton. A 1966 legal settlement granted subsequent royalties to Ely.)	2 (Note: Dave Marsh asserts that "Louie Louie" "far outsold" the No. 1 record "Dominique", but that "proper decorum" was a factor in keeping it from Billboard's top spot.)	1	— (Note: Billboard R&B chart not published from November 30, 1963, to January 23, 1965.)	1	1	1	23	Jerden 712; Wand 143 (Note: Released on regional Jerden label in April. Released nationally on Wand label in October.)	In Person (Note: Alternate version included on Live and Unreleased.) (Note: Alternate version included on Live at the Castle) — (Note: Included as a bonus track on the 1993 CD reissue of The Kingsmen In Person.)
1964	"Money" (Gordy–Bradford) b/w "Bent Scepter" (Gallucci)	16	17	—	6	24	24	—	Wand 150	In Person (Note: Alternate version included on 15 Great Hits) (Note: Alternate version included on Since We've Been Gone.); In Person
1964	"Little Latin Lupe Lu" (Medley) b/w "David's Mood" (Lewis)	46	49	—	—	66	—	—	Wand 157	Volume II; Volume II
1964	"Death of an Angel" (Woods) b/w "Searchin' for Love" (Gust)	42	33	—	29	42	36	—	Wand 164	Volume II; Volume 3
1964	"The Jolly Green Giant" (Easton, Harris, Terry) b/w "Long Green" (Easton)	4	8	25	—	6	1	—	Wand 172	Volume 3 Volume II / Volume 3 (Note: "Long Green" released on both albums.)
1965	"The Climb" (Easton) b/w "The Waiting" (Gallucci-Easton)	65	45	—	—	39	—	—	Wand 183	On Campus; In Person
1965	"Annie Fanny" (Easton) b/w "Give Her Lovin'" (Easton)	47	43	—	—	29	13	—	Wand 189	On Campus — (Note: Included as a bonus track on the 1993 CD reissue of The Kingsmen Volume II. Also on the 1965 How to Stuff a Wild Bikini soundtrack album)
1965	"(You Got) The Gamma Goochee" (Mangiagli) b/w "It's Only The Dog" (Wayne)	122	98	—	—	95	—	—	Wand 1107	— — (Note: Included as a bonus track on the 1993 CD reissue of The Kingsmen Volume 3.)
1966	"Killer Joe" (Russell–Elgin–Medley) b/w "Little Green Thing" (Lewis)	77	81	—	—	66	—	—	Wand 1115	15 Great Hits (Note: Included as a bonus track on the 1993 CD reissue of Up and Away.); On Campus
1966	"The Krunch" (Note: Some copies have "The Crunch".) (Easton) b/w "The Climb" (Easton)	— (Note: "The Climb" charted previously as a 1965 A-side)	—	—	—	—	—	—	Wand 1118 (Note: Promotional release with white label and picture sleeve. Stock label copies also exist.)	— On Campus
1966	"Little Sally Tease" (Valley) b/w "My Wife Can't Cook" (Russ)	— (Note: Listed (unranked) July 9, 1966, in "Spotlight Singles", p. 16.)	— (Note: Listed (unranked) July 9, 1966, in "Pick of the Week", p. 6.)	—	—	— (Note: Listed (unranked) July 2, 1966, in "Four Star Picks", p. 23.)	—	—	Wand 1127	Up and Away — (Note: Included as a bonus track on the 1994 CD reissue of The Kingsmen On Campus.)
1966	"If I Needed Someone" (Note: "If I Need Someone" on label.) (Harrison) b/w "Grass Is Green" (Peterson–Mitchell)	— (Note: Listed (unranked) October 8, 1966, in "Spotlight Singles", p. 16.)	128	—	—	136	—	—	Wand 1137	Up and Away; Up and Away
1966	"Louie 64-65-66" (Berry) b/w "Haunted Castle" (Easton)	97	65	—	30	76	—	—	Wand 143 (Note: Re-release of 1963 original with retitled A-side.)	In Person —
1967	"Trouble" (Resnick–Levine) b/w "Daytime Shadows" (Easton–Tannen–Wildey)	— (Note: Listed (unranked) January 21, 1967, in "Spotlight Singles", p. 14.)	— (Note: Listed (unranked) February 4, 1967, in "Pick of the Week", p. 22.)	—	—	— (Note: Listed (unranked) January 21, 1967, in "Sleepers of the Week", p. 1.)	—	—	Wand 1147	Up and Away; Up and Away
1967	"Children's Caretaker" (Peterson) b/w "The Wolf of Manhattan" (Levine–Resnick)	— (Note: Listed (unranked) April 15, 1967, in "Spotlight Singles", p. 18.)	— (Note: Listed (unranked) May 6, 1967, in "Best Bets", p. 26.)	—	—	—	—	—	Wand 1154	Up and Away —
1967	"(I Have Found) Another Girl" (Curtis–Peterson) b/w "Don't Say No" (Bartholemew–Richardson) (Note: Bartholemew and Richardson were Barry Curtis and Dick Peterson of the Kingsmen.)	— (Note: Listed (unranked) May 20, 1967, in "Spotlight Singles", p.18.)	— (Note: Listed (unranked) May 20, 1967, in "Pick of the Week", p. 24.)	—	—	95	—	—	Wand 1157	Up and Away —
1967	"Bo Diddley Bach" (Sonny Curtis) b/w "Just Before the Break of Day" (Tillison)	128	139	—	—	143	—	—	Wand 1164 (Note: Both tracks produced by Snuff Garrett.)	— Since We've Been Gone
1968	"Get Out of My Life Woman" (Toussaint) b/w "Since You've Been Gone" (Dangel–Ormsby–Merrill)	—	—	—	—	—	—	—	Wand 1174	— —
1968	"On Love" (Bell–Turnbull) b/w "I Guess I Was Dreamin'" (Weston–Rabbitt)	—	— (Note: Listed (unranked) May 25, 1968, in "Best Bets", p. 22.)	—	—	—	—	—	Wand 1180	— —
1973	"You Better Do Right" (Kingsmen) b/w "Today'" (Kingsmen)	— (Note: Listed (unranked) April 7, 1973, in "Pop Picks", p.70.)	— (Note: Listed (unranked) March 31, 1973, in "Picks of the Week", p. 16.)	—	—	— (Note: Listed (unranked) March 31, 1973, in "Sleepers of the Week", p. 1.)	—	—	Capitol 3576	— —
* Most album cuts had crowd noise overdubs to simulate a live performance. * The late 1968 release on Earth 104 ("Feed Me"/"Just a B-side") is not included in the singles discography as it was released by Kingsmen management using studio musicians while the original group was on a recording and touring hiatus.

=== Appearances (1960s releases) ===
- Original Great Northwest Hits, Volume 1 (Jerden JRL 7001, 1964) – "Louie Louie"
- Original Great Northwest Hits, Volume 2 (Jerden JRL 7002, 1964) – "J.A.J."
- The Groups are the Greatest – The Greatest of the Groups (Scepter 518, 1964) – "Louie Louie", "Money", "Bent Scepter"
- Murray The K – The Fifth Beatle Gives You Their Golden Gassers (Scepter 524, 1964) – "Louie Louie", "Money"
- The Greatest on Stage (Wand 661, 1965) – "David's Mood", "Money", "Louie Louie"
- How to Stuff a Wild Bikini soundtrack (Wand 671, 1965) – "Give Her Lovin'", "How to Stuff a Wild Bikini" (Note: Only release of "How to Stuff a Wild Bikini".)
- The Hitmakers (Jerden JRL 7005, 1965) – "Twist and Shout", "All the Little Animals" (Note: Only release of "All The Little Animals".)
- KHJ Boss Goldens, Volume 1 (Original Sound KHJ 9365, 1965) – "The Jolly Green Giant"
- Wolfman's Favorite Oldies (Scepter 564, 1967) – "Louie Louie", "Killer Joe"
- Battle of the Bands, Volume 2 (Panorama 109, 1967) – "C.C. Rider"
- 보칼 넘버원! 제1집, (Daedo Records EU-138, 1968) – "Louie Louie" (Note: Korean various artists compilation.)

Discography notes

== Other uses of the name ==
Prior to this group's formation, another group called The Kingsmen operated in 1958 and was made up of members of Bill Haley & His Comets who were moonlighting from their regular work with Haley. This group scored a hit record (No. 35) on Billboard with the instrumental entitled "Week End", written by Rudy Pompilli, Franny Beecher, and Billy Williamson, backed with "Better Believe It" as the B side. They released a follow-up single on East West Records featuring "The Catwalk" backed with "Conga Rock". Although the Comets did the actual recordings, when the Kingsmen went on tour a different set of musicians performed instead of Haley's people. The band made at least one appearance on American Bandstand in 1958.

Many other groups have used the name "The Kingsmen", including a gospel vocal group formed in 1956 (also referred to as The Kingsmen Quartet), and bands that were later renamed as Flamin' Groovies, The Gants and The Statler Brothers. An a cappella group at Columbia University is traditionally known as the Kingsmen; former members include Art Garfunkel and the original lineup of Sha Na Na.
