= I Believe in Love (Bonnie Guitar song) =

Single by Bonnie Guitar

from the album I Believe in Love
- B-side: "Faded Love"
- Released: April 1968
- Recorded: January 1968; Hollywood, California, U.S.
- Genre: Country, Nashville Sound
- Label: Dot
- Songwriter: Boudleaux Bryant
- Producers: Bonnie Guitar, George Richey

Bonnie Guitar singles chronology
"Stop the Sun" (1967)	"I Believe in Love" (1968)	"Leaves Are the Tears of Autumn" (1968)

"I Believe in Love" is a song written by Boudleaux Bryant and recorded by American country artist, Bonnie Guitar.

The song was recorded in January 1968 and officially released as a single in April. "I Believe in Love" peaked at number ten on the Billboard Hot Country Singles chart, becoming her third and final top ten on any Billboard list. The single also became Guitar's final major hit as a musical artist. Additionally, "I Believe in Love" reached a peak of number thirty on the Canadian RPM Country Songs chart in August 1968. It became her final chart appearance on the latter chart. The single was later issued on Guitar's album for Dot Records, also entitled I Believe in Love.

== Chart performance ==
Chart (1968)	Peak position
U.S. Billboard Hot Country Singles	10
Canada RPM Country Songs	30
