= Jack Ely =

American guitarist and singer (1943–2015)

- Ely in 1978

Background information
- Born: September 11, 1943; Portland, Oregon, United States
- Died: April 28, 2015 (aged 71) Terrebonne, Oregon, United States
- Genres: Garage rock, Christian rock
- Occupations: Musician, horse trainer
- Instruments: Guitar, vocals
- Years active: 1959–2015
- Labels: Jerden, Wand, RCA, Bang

Jack Brown Ely (September 11, 1943 – April 28, 2015) was an American guitarist and singer, best known for singing the Kingsmen's version of "Louie Louie". Classically trained in piano, he began playing guitar after seeing Elvis Presley on television. In 1959, he co-founded the Kingsmen and with them recorded "Louie Louie" in 1963; Ely's famously incoherent vocals were partly the result of his braces and the rudimentary recording method. Before the record became a hit Ely was forced out of the group and began playing with his new band, the Courtmen. Ely died in Terrebonne, Oregon, on April 28, 2015, at age 71.

== Early life ==
Jack Ely was born on September 11, 1943, in Portland, Oregon. Both of his parents were music majors at the University of Oregon, and his father, Ken Ely, was a singer. His father died when he was four years old and his mother subsequently remarried.

Ely began playing piano while still a young child, and was performing recitals all over the Portland area before his seventh birthday. When he was eleven, a piano teacher provided what he termed "jazz improvisation lessons." The teacher would show Ely a section of a classical composition, and the boy would have to make up 15 similar pieces. He would be required to share each in class and then make up one on the spot.

On January 28, 1956, Ely watched Elvis Presley on television for the first time, and he decided that he wanted to play guitar. At his first guitar lesson, he was required to play "Mary Had a Little Lamb", an experience that Ely found so demeaning that he quit after that lesson and began picking out his favorite guitar riffs by ear. Ely played guitar and sang for the Young Oregonians, a travelling vaudeville show for entertainers under the age of 18. "We didn't get paid in money, we got paid in experience," Ely recalled.

== The Kingsmen ==
Ely was enrolled at Washington High School in Portland, Oregon. He did not play in the school band, but had a passion for singing. In 1959, Lynn Easton's mother invited him to play at a Portland hotel gig, with Ely singing and playing guitar with the backup band and Easton on the drum kit. The two teenagers had grown up together, as their parents were close friends. Easton and Ely performed at yacht club parties, and soon added Mike Mitchell on guitar and Bob Nordby on bass to round out a band. They called themselves the Kingsmen, taking the name from a recently disbanded group. The Kingsmen began their collective career playing at fashion shows, Red Cross events, and supermarket promotions, generally avoiding rock songs on their setlist. Ely played with the Kingsmen as he attended Portland State University.

Wand 143: Second pressing with "Lead vocal by Jack Ely" text

In 1962, while playing a gig at the Pypo Club in Seaside, Oregon, the band noticed Rockin' Robin Roberts's version of "Louie Louie" being played on the jukebox for hours on end. The entire club would get up and dance. Ely convinced the Kingsmen to learn the song, which they played at dances to a great crowd response. He unintentionally changed the beat of the entire song, basing it on Roberts's intro only. Ken Chase, host of radio station KISN, formed his own club dubbed "The Chase" to capitalize on these dance crazes. The Kingsmen became the club's house band and Ken Chase became the band's manager. Ely was begging Chase to let the band record their own version of "Louie Louie", and on April 5, 1963, Chase booked the band an hour-long session at the local Northwestern Inc. studio for the following day. The band had just played a 90-minute "Louie Louie" marathon.

Despite the band's annoyance at having so little time to prepare, the Kingsmen walked into the recording studio on April 6 at 10:00 am. In order to sound like a live performance, the group's equipment was arranged such that Ely was forced to lean back and sing into a boom microphone suspended high above the floor. "It was more yelling than singing," Ely said, "'cause I was trying to be heard over all the instruments." In addition, he was wearing braces at the time of the performance, further compounding his infamously slurred words. Ely sang the beginning of the third verse a few bars too early, but realized his mistake and waited for the rest of the band to catch up. In what was thought to be a warm-up, the song was recorded in its first and only take. The Kingsmen were not proud of the version, but their manager liked the rawness of their cover. The B-side was "Haunted Castle", composed by Ely and Don Gallucci, the new keyboardist. The one hour session cost either $36, $50, or somewhere in between and the band split the cost.

On August 16 during a band practice, Easton staged a "hostile takeover", telling Ely that he wanted to abandon the drums and become the frontman and singer. Ely would have to become the drummer, and since the band's name was registered to Easton only, he technically led the group. Ely was not happy with this turn of events, and he and Nordby left the band at once. At the time, the song had sold roughly 600 copies and it was thought that the Kingsmen would disband. When he found out "Louie Louie" was climbing up the Billboard charts, Ely attempted to rejoin the group, but was blocked by Easton who was intent on adding replacements.

In a 1998 interview Ely said, "My life stopped at that moment. It was my voice. I was the one who found the song. I was the one that arranged it. It was my band. And look what happened." Seeking "redemption and retribution", he formed his own "Kingsmen" group, touring as "The Original Singer of Louie Louie", and also recorded "Love That Louie" in 1964 for RCA Records as Jack E. Lee and the Squires.

A legal battle ensued and a 1966 settlement resulted in Ely ceasing to call his group the Kingsmen and Wand Records being required to credit Ely as lead vocalist on all future "Louie Louie" pressings. Ely received $6000 in royalties, and Easton had to stop lip-synching the song in live performances. Ely also received royalties going forward for "Louie Louie" and "Haunted Castle", plus a gold record for "Louie Louie" (which he never received).

== Later life and career ==
After a brief stint with Don and the Goodtimes, Ely began touring with his renamed group, the Courtmen. In 1966, they released "Louie Louie '66" and "Ride Ride Baby" with Bert Berns at Bang Records, but neither charted. With the Vietnam War on the horizon, Ely was conscripted into the army, and found his career had waned upon his return to the United States in 1968. Ely spiraled down into drug and alcohol addiction, but then spoke out against it with the Rockers Against Drugs.

He re-recorded "Louie Louie" with studio musicians in 1976 (released on 60's Dance Party, 1982, and other compilations) and again in 1980 (released on 10 Big Hits of the Rock 'n' Roll Era, 1980, and other compilations).

Ely lived at his farm in Terrebonne, Oregon, where he trained horses. He was a strong supporter of the Performance Rights Act, which would give royalties to recording artists and record labels. Since Ely was not the original author, he never received any money from the radio play of "Louie Louie." In an interview, he said, "It's not just about me. There are a lot of one-hit wonders out there just like me who deserve compensation when their recorded performances are played and stations get ad revenue from it."

In 2012, Ely released a Christian rock album, Love Is All Around You Now.

== Death ==
Ely died at his Oregon residence on April 28, 2015, at the age of 71, having long suffered from an unknown illness. Ely was a Christian Scientist, and "because of his religious beliefs we're not even sure what it [the illness] was," his son Sean Ely said. The younger Ely believed his father suffered from skin cancer.

At the time of his death he was survived by his wife of 16 years, Wendy Maxson Ely, three children, six grandchildren and two great-grandchildren.

== Discography ==
=== Singles ===
- "Louie Louie"/"Haunted Castle" (Jerden 712) 1963 (as The Kingsmen) – regional release
- "Louie Louie"/"Haunted Castle" (Wand 143) 1963 (as The Kingsmen) – national release; "Lead vocal by Jack Ely" on label after 1964 settlement; B-side changed to "Little Green Thing" on later pressings; re-released in 1966 as "Louie Louie 64-65-66" w/ "Haunted Castle" B-side
  2012 CD
- "Love That Louie"/"Octavepuss" (RCA 47-8452) 1964 (as Jack E. Lee and the Squires)
- "Louie Louie '66"/"David's Mood" (Bang B-520) 1966 (as Jack Eely [sic] and the Courtmen)
- "Ride Ride Baby"/"Louie Go Home" (Bang B-534) 1966 (as Jack Ely and the Courtmen)
- "Love Is All Around You Now"/"Highway Robbery" (Roar 201) 2012

=== Albums ===
- The Kingsman (Signet 3411-56J), 1990 (cassette only)
- Love Is All Around You Now (Mondo Tunes 001), 2012 (Internet release)

=== Other ===
- Ely's 1976 and 1980 re-recorded versions of "Louie Louie" appeared on multiple "original artist" compilations of 1960s hits as being by "Jack Ely" or "The Kingsmen featuring Jack Ely".
