= A Woman in Love (Bonnie Guitar song) =

""A Woman in Love""

Single by Bonnie Guitar

from the album Stop the Sun/A Woman in Love
- B-side: "I Want My Baby"
- Released: July 1967
- Recorded: June 1967; Hollywood, California, U.S.
- Genre: Country
- Label: Dot
- Songwriter: Charles Anderson
- Producers: Bonnie Guitar, George Richey

Bonnie Guitar singles chronology
"You Can Steal Me" (1967)	""A Woman in Love"" (1967)	"Stop the Sun" (1967)

"A Woman in Love" is a song written by Charles Anderson and recorded by American country artist, Bonnie Guitar.

The song was officially released as a single in July 1967, peaking at number four on the Billboard Hot Country Singles chart. "A Woman in Love" became Bonnie Guitar's second top-ten single on the Billboard country chart. It also became her highest-charting hit single on any Billboard chart. Additionally, "A Woman in Love" reached number thirteen on the Canadian RPM Country Songs chart in November 1967, becoming her first charting single on that list. The song was later released on Guitar's 1967 album, Stop the Sun/A Woman in Love on Dot Records.

== Chart performance ==
Chart (1967)	Peak position
U.S. Billboard Hot Country Singles	4
Canada RPM Country Songs	13
