= Paul Tutmarc =

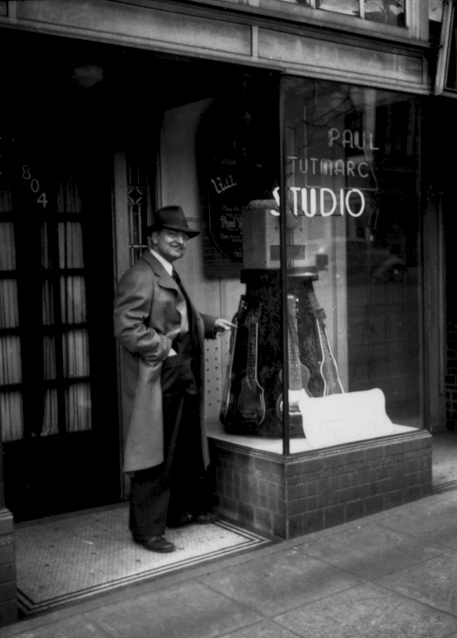
- Paul Tutmarc outside his Seattle music studio

Background information
- Born: May 29, 1896; Minneapolis, Minnesota, U.S.
- Died: September 25, 1972 (aged 76) Seattle, Washington, U.S.
- Genres: Country, Hawaiian, popular song
- Instruments: Vocals, Spanish guitar, ukulele, banjo, lap steel guitar, bass guitar, organ
- Years active: 1908–1972

Paul Tutmarc (May 29, 1896 – September 25, 1972) was an American musician and musical instrument inventor. He was a tenor singer and a performer and teacher of the lap steel guitar and the ukulele. He developed a number of variant types of stringed musical instruments, such as electrically amplified double basses, bass guitar, and lap steel guitars. His second marriage was to his former student Bonnie Buckingham, known as Bonnie Guitar.

== Career ==
As a child, Tutmarc sang in a church choir. As pre-teen, he sang and played guitar and banjo, and in his teens, he played Hawaiian-style acoustic steel guitar. He worked with a traveling vaudeville troupe. In his early 20s, Tutmarc moved to Seattle to work in the dock-area shipyards. In the mid-1920s, Tutmarc became known for his tenor voice. In the late 1920s, he performed on the radio and in a variety of theaters.

In the very early 1930s, Tutmarc began teaching guitar and experimenting with the electrification (and amplification) of various instruments including a piano, zither, and a Spanish-style guitar by using a wire-wrapped magnet as a "pickup" that could be amplified through a modified Atwater-Kent brand radio.

Tutmarc's Audiovox Manufacturing Co. was one of the first firms to produce an electric lap steel guitar, and Tutmarc himself was often the demonstrator and promoter. He invented a solid-body electric upright "bull-fiddle" in 1935 but it mainly served as a publicity tool. He manufactured lap steel guitars with his own "blade" pickup, and accompanying amplifiers. His real claim to fame was the development and marketing of the fretted and solid-body Audiovox Model 736 Bass Fiddle, from 1936, which was designed to be used in a horizontal position. That then-radical instrument is considered to be history's earliest electric bass guitar—and one that preceded the far more famous Fender Precision Bass by a decade and a half,and possibly also the Gibson bass EB model. Tutmarc also manufactured an accompanying bass amplifier, the Audiovox Model 936.

The Museum of Pop Culture in Seattle has an original Audiovox 736 Bass, found by historian Peter Blecha in the late 1990s. In March 2018 an original Audiovox 736 bass, one of four reported to still exist, was sold at auction for US$23,000.

Tutmarc continued performing until the late 1960s, and he kept on teaching until he died of cancer on September 25, 1972.

== Personal life ==
Tutmarc married his first wife Lorraine in 1921; their two children Jeanne and Paul Jnr. (known as "Bud") were born in 1922 and 1924 respectively. In 1944 Tutmarc married, and later recorded with, his former student Bonnie Buckingham, known as Bonnie Guitar (1923–2019). Together they had one child, Paula, (1950–2013). Bonnie and Paul split in 1955. Both Bonnie and Paula pursued their music careers; Paula under various stage names including Alexys, Iris Hill, and Cookie Irene.

Bud Tutmarc followed in his father's footsteps as a musician, playing the Hawaiian steel guitar, and instrument manufacturer. Bud Tutmarc's Serenader Bass was derived from his father's invention. Paul Tutmarc's great-grandson Shane Tutmarc is also a musician.
