= Phil Medley =

American songwriter (1916–1997)

Philip Medley (April 9, 1916 – October 3, 1997) was an American songwriter, notable for his composition "Twist and Shout", which he wrote along with Bert Russell. The song was made famous when it was covered by both the Isley Brothers and the Beatles. Medley also managed a music group called the Everglades, composed of Jerry Hayward (Lead), Robert Leak (a.k.a. Bobby "T-Boy" Taylor of "Magnetic Touch", father of Robert Taylor Jr.), James McCauthin, David Cox, and Herbie Hancock. Medley composed and produced a song for them entitled "Limbo Lucy" in 1962 on Capitol Records. Medley also wrote "A Million to One" and co-wrote, also with Russell, "If I Didn't Have a Dime" for Gene Pitney. He was also a co-writer of the song "Killer Joe", recorded by many bands including the Rocky Fellers, the Rivieras and the Kingsmen. In 1994, he played guitar for the Jeffersons at the Great Oak Farm Benefit.

Medley's niece is singer Sharon Brown, who had a top ten hit on the Billboard Hot Dance Club Play chart in 1982 with the song "I Specialize in Love".
