= Sunn =

Musical instrument amplifiers

Sunn Musical Equipment Corporation
- Formerly: Sunn Musical Equipment Company
- Company type: Private
- Industry: Musical instrument amplification
- Founded: 1965 in Tualatin, Oregon, US
- Founder: Conrad Sundholm; Norm Sundholm
- Headquarters: United States
- Products: Instrument amplifiers
- Owner: Fender (1985–2002); Sunn Musical Equipment Corporation (2023–present)
- Website: sunnamps.com

Sunn (stylized in all lowercase as sunn) is a brand of musical instrument amplifiers based in Tualatin, Oregon, United States.

== History ==
In early 1963, the Kingsmen, a band based in Portland, Oregon, became known for their hit version of the song "Louie, Louie". After its hit single, the band soon embarked on a 50-state national tour. Because the band was used to playing small hops and school dances, many of the members found themselves ill-equipped with the amplifiers that they were currently using. Bassist Norm Sundholm discovered that his bass amp was not nearly powerful enough to play larger concert halls. Sundholm enlisted the help of his brother Conrad to help solve his problem. By 1964, the Sundholm brothers had designed a high-powered concert bass amplifier. The early Sunn amplifiers relied heavily on tube amplifiers designed by David Hafler and preamps sold by the Dynaco Hi-fi company, with many of the first units actually containing power amplifier chassis sold by Dynaco (models MKII, MKIII, MKIV) as well as modified Dyna PAS1 preamplifiers. By 1965, the demand for Sundholm's amplifiers had increased to the point where the family garage could no longer be used as the manufacturing facility. At this point the Sunn amplifiers still relied on the Dyna power amp circuitry, reworked to fit Sunn's own chassis but still employing Dyna produced and branded transformers and the same electronic design. Thus, the Sunn Musical Equipment Company was founded. Throughout the original Sunn Amplifier line they employed Dynaco designed and built transformers (up to the 120 watt MK VI transformer set) and Hafler based power amp designs until Sunn stopped producing the original line of tube amplifiers in favor of the solid-state Concert and Coliseum models. Later Sunn produced the electronically unrelated Model T tube amps.

Fender acquired Sunn in 1985, relocating operations from Tualatin to Lake Oswego. The stated intent was to both revitalize the Sunn amplifier lines and to produce some Fender-branded models as well, which included the Standard Series (Princeton Chorus and Ultra/Ultimate Chorus, both solid-state) and M-80 Series, and are identified as USA-made amplifiers with an "LO"-prefix serial number.

Fender shut down the Sunn operation in 2002.

In 2023 a group of experienced music and electronics industry executives licensed the rights to build Sunn branded products and formed the Sunn Musical Equipment Corporation. The team includes executives from Mission Engineering, Bose, Fender, Charvel, Yamaha, Intel, Hastings and HP, as well as an advisory team made up of former Sunn engineers, designers and management.

== In popular culture ==
The band Sunn O))) was named after the company. The band’s name includes a modified typographic representation of the Sunn logo.
