= Bonnie Guitar =

American country music singer-songwriter (1923–2019)

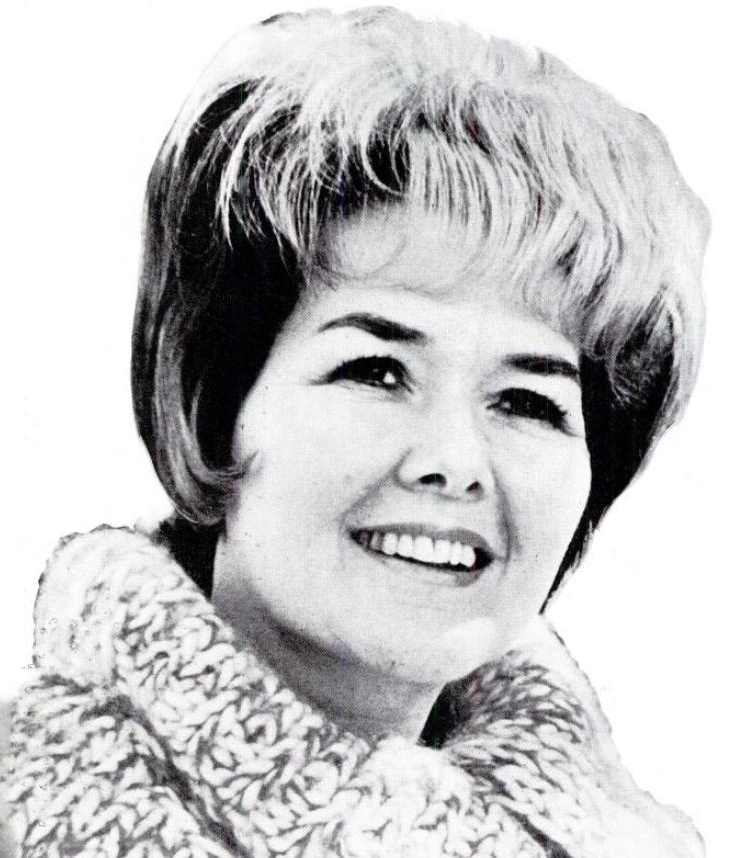
- Bonnie Guitar in 1966

Background information
- Born: Bonnie Buckingham; March 25, 1923; Seattle, Washington, U.S.
- Died: January 12, 2019 (aged 95) Soap Lake, Washington, U.S.
- Genres: Country, pop
- Occupations: Singer-songwriter, musician, businesswoman, horse/cattle breeder
- Instruments: Vocals, guitar
- Years active: 1956–1996
- Labels: Dot Records, Dolton Records, Columbia Records, MCA Records
- Spouses: Paul Tutmarc (m. 1944; div. 1955) Mario DePiano (m. 1969; died 1983)
- Website: Bonnie Guitar official website

Bonnie Buckingham (March 25, 1923 – January 12, 2019), better known as Bonnie Guitar, was an American singer, musician, producer, and businesswoman. She was best known for her 1957 song, "Dark Moon", which was a country-pop crossover hit. She became one of the first female country music singers to have hit songs cross over from the country charts to the pop charts.

She co-founded the record company Dolton Records in the late 1950s, that launched the careers of The Fleetwoods and The Ventures. In 1960, she left Dolton and became part owner of Jerden Records.

== Early life and rise to fame ==
Born in 1923 in Seattle, Washington, United States, to John and Doris Buckingham, Bonnie was initially raised in Redondo Beach along Puget Sound. Later, the family (including her five siblings) moved inland to a farm just outside the rural town of Auburn. She began performing at age 16, having taken up playing the guitar as a teenager, which led to her stage name, Bonnie Guitar. She later started songwriting.

In 1944 she married her former guitar teacher Paul Tutmarc; the couple had one daughter, Paula (born 1950), but split up in 1955, and Bonnie moved to Los Angeles. Through much of the 1950s, she worked as a session guitarist at quite a few small labels, like Abbot, Fabor, and Radio Recorders.

Through this studio work, Guitar gained recognition as a professional guitarist, contributing to recording sessions for artists such as Jim Reeves, Dorsey Burnette, Ned Miller, and the DeCastro Sisters. During this period, she developed an interest in pursuing a recording career as a vocalist.

Following the release of her first single, "Hello, Hello, Please Answer The Phone" on Fabor Records, Bonnie heard a demo of "Dark Moon" from Fabor's owner, Fabor Robinson, a tune written by Ned Miller, with whom she worked as a session guitarist. Robinson was dissatisfied with how Dorsey Burnette sang a version of it and offered it to Guitar. "I said, 'I'll give up my royalties and everything just to do this song,'" she told Robinson in recounting their collaboration on "Dark Moon" to Wayne Jancik in The Billboard Book of One-Hit Wonders. "I knew it was up for grabs and somebody was gonna get it. I got it, but he took me at my word, and I really did give up my royalties. It was one of the hardest things I ever put together. Ned [Miller] wrote it, but we tried in maybe five or six different ways in different studios before it came out right." The final version consisted of just two guitars and a bass backing Bonnie.

"Dark Moon" was originally issued by Fabor Records in February 1957. In a matter of days or weeks the song was reissued on Dot Records, and by early June 1957 it made the pop top 10 chart and country top 15.

== Early music success in 1957 ==
When Bonnie's rendition of "Dark Moon" impacted the pop and country charts she received recognition in the music business. Not only was she one of a handful of female country singers at that time, but also one of the few in the country field to manage a crossover hit.

The only other female country singer achieving a crossover success was Patsy Cline. Her single "Walkin' After Midnight" was a No. 2 country hit and a No. 12 pop hit. "Dark Moon" earned Bonnie national attention, and she made TV appearances on "The Ed Sullivan Show" (June 30) and Dick Clark's American Bandstand (October 29).

Like Patsy Cline, Bonnie was unable to replicate her crossover appeal. Follow-ups on Dot Records, "If You See My Love Dancing" and another song after called "Mister Fire Eyes" failed to have an impact on the pop chart, the latter only making it to No. 71. On the country chart though, the second became a Top 15 hit. However, due to her lack of pop success, her contract eventually ended with Dot Records.

== Running a record label and re-entering country music in the 1960s ==
Guitar however decided she would form her own record label called Dolphin Records which she co-founded with refrigerator salesman Bob Reisdorff. When the pair decided to rename the label Dolton Records (they were forced to, due an already-existing Dolphin label name), many of Guitar's singles including "Candy Apple Red" and "Born to Be With You" were released. In 1959, her own recording career was superseded by that of a high school trio called The Fleetwoods. The trio was signed to the Dolton label and soon had major pop hits in 1959, with two No. 1 hits, "Come Softly to Me" and "Mr. Blue".

Soon another group, The Ventures, were signed to Bonnie's Dolton label. They too had a hit with "Walk Don't Run". However, Guitar thought it was time she would get her own music career back on foot. She soon left Dolton, and went back to Dot Records where she recorded a series of country albums throughout the 1960s.

In 1961, she appeared as herself on an episode of To Tell The Truth with Johnny Carson, Ralph Bellamy, Dina Merrill, and Betty White as panelists. Only White correctly identified her.

In 1963, she took a temporary leave to record a concept album under contract with Charter Records. The album told a romantic story beginning with songs featuring themes about first sight, through courting, going steady, threats from others, getting engaged, getting it broken off, having the man marry someone else and finally having the woman live happily ever after on her own at the end. The original heyday of concept albums by such as Frank Sinatra and Nat King Cole had long gone by 1964, and the fashion for concept albums by those including Beatles and Pink Floyd were a few years away, so the album was shelved. Even though the album was never released commercially, in its original format, a single was released entitled "Outside Looking In" — however, it failed to show on either the country or pop charts. White label charter test pressings of the original concept album exist, however, and most of the songs on it found their way onto subsequent albums, with the remaining material such as the country remake version of "Dark Moon" and Ned Miller's "Lucky Star" being featured in a 1972 Paramount Records double-album compilation of her work.

It was in 1966 that she began a brief stint as one of the most successful female soloists in the country music field. "I'm Living in Two Worlds" became Guitar's first Top 10 Country hit (the record also hit the pop Hot 100). She scored an even bigger country success in 1967 with the No. 4 hit "A Woman in Love". That same year, she won the Academy of Country Music's "Top Female Vocalist" award. In 1968, "I Believe in Love" was another Top 10 hit. Guitar teamed up with Buddy Killen, and together they had a minor hit duet with "A Truer Love You'll Never Find (Than Mine)" which was issued in 1969 at a time when Guitar's chart success was starting to fade.

== Later career ==
In the 1970s, Guitar recorded for Columbia Records and MCA Records and had occasional minor hit records. She charted for the first time in many years in 1980 with the single "Honey On the Moon". In 1986, she recorded for the Tumbleweed label. She later continued performing and playing until she announced she was retiring in 1996. She lived in Soap Lake, Washington, and in 2014 started producing and writing music and still performed on weekends at the age of 92 with her band.

== Personal life and death ==
She raised cattle and quarter horses in Orting, Washington, with her second husband, Mario DePiano, whom she married in 1969. He died in 1983.

Bonnie Guitar died in Soap Lake, Washington on January 12, 2019, at the age of 95.
