= Jerden Records =

American record label

- Founded: 1960
- Founder: Jerry Dennon; Bonnie Guitar
- Defunct: 1971
- Status: Defunct
- Country of origin: U.S.
- Location: Seattle, Washington

Jerden Records was an independent record label which operated from May 1960 through April 1971.

It was based in Seattle and majority owned by Jerry Dennon and Bonnie Guitar, both of whom had been involved with Dolton Records and the careers of The Fleetwoods on that label. A split with Dolton over artistic control brought about the new Jerden label. Certain Jerden record issues were distributed by Liberty Records.

The label closed after the first year and its owners went their separate ways. Both ended up in Hollywood, Guitar as an artist for RCA Victor Records and then Dot Records and Dennon doing promotion work for Era Records.

Dennon's career was halted by military service, but in late 1962 he resurrected Jerden as full owner. He reissued recordings from Jerden's early days, including a disc by Bonnie Guitar issued in January 1963.

It was during this second life that The Kingsmen's "Louie Louie" arrived (1963) and it is this million selling disc that is the best known of all Dennon's products. In summer 1964 Jerden updated the label design with a turquoise background. In fall 1965 Jerden began a distribution agreement with ABC-Paramount Records. This agreement ended in October 1968.

Panorama Records was founded in 1964 by Jerry Dennon and Piccadilly Records in 1966. Piccadilly was used as a regional testing label, releasing artists exclusively only in the Northwest. If the record tested successfully, it was sold to national labels through licensing deals. Panorama was used in a similar manner. Both labels ended in 1968.

Burdette Records, founded in 1967 by Dennon, was the label that took Jerden's place for national exposure. Burdette was distributed by Tower Records, which was a division of Capitol Records. The Jerden label folded in 1970 but was revived from 1992 to 2001, issuing five volumes of Beatles interviews, as well as several volumes of presidential speeches and multiple Northwest-oriented collections.
