= Wand Records =

American record label

- Parent company: Scepter Records
- Founded: 1961
- Founder: Florence Greenberg
- Status: Defunct
- Genre: Various
- Location: U.S.

Wand Records was an American independent record label, started by Florence Greenberg in 1961 as a subsidiary of Scepter Records. Artists on Wand Records included The Isley Brothers, The Kingsmen, Mel Wynn & the Rhythm Aces, Chuck Jackson, and the Monzas.

In 1976, Greenberg retired from the business and sold her record labels to Springboard International. When Springboard went bankrupt, Gusto Records acquired the catalog. The Kingsmen acquired full ownership of their Wand catalog in court from Gusto for non-payment of royalties.

== Wand label artists ==
Chuck Jackson was the first artist signed to Wand. His single "I Don't Want to Cry" (Wand 106) went to No. 36 on the Billboard Hot 100 and No. 5 on the R&B chart in 1961. The Isley Brothers released their classic single "Twist and Shout" (Wand 124), which peaked at No. 17 on the Hot 100 and No. 2 on the R&B chart in 1962. In 1963, the Kingsmen released "Louie Louie" (Wand 143), which reached No. 2 on the Hot 100. Maxine Brown had a number for singles released on the label, including "Oh No Not My Baby" (Wand 162) in 1964.

Some artists to have one-off releases include Benny Gordon with "Gonna Give Her All The Love I Got", and a singer called Al Wilson. For some time there has been speculation and discussion among some Northern soul collectors and enthusiasts that the single "Help Me", composed and produced by Johnny Northern and Ralph Bailey, arranged by Robert Banks, is not the same Al Wilson who recorded "The Snake". It is believed by some that this may be a completely different singer who happened to have the same name.

=== List of artists ===
- Al Wilson (New York singer)
- Benny Gordon
- B.J. Thomas
- Bobby Bland
- Brenton Wood
- Canned Heat
- Chuck Jackson
- Clarence Reid
- Dee Clark
- Don and the Goodtimes
- The Esquires
- Freddie Hughes
- General Crook (musician)
- The Independents
- Isley Brothers
- Jackie Moore
- Jimmie Green
- Joe Jeffrey Group
- Johnny Copeland
- The Kingsmen
- The Last Five
- L.C. Cooke
- Lois Lane
- The Masqueraders
- Maxine Brown
- Mel Wynn & the Rhythm Aces
- The Monzas
- The Moving Sidewalks
- Nella Dodds
- The Next Five
- Roscoe Robinson
- Shirelles
- South Shore Commission
- Tammy Montgomery (Tammi Terrell)
- Timmy Shaw
- Walter Lee & the Leeds
- Dionne Warwick

== See also ==
- List of record labels
