= Here Are the Sonics =

Studio album by the Sonics
- Released: March 1965
- Recorded: 1964
- Studios: Audio Recording, Seattle, Washington
- Genres: Garage rock; rock and roll; proto-punk
- Length: 28:48
- Label: Etiquette
- Producers: Buck Ormsby; Kent Morrill

The Sonics chronology
Here Are the Sonics (1965)	Boom (1966)

Singles from Here Are The Sonics
- 1. "The Witch" / "Keep A-Knockin'" Released: November 1964; 2. "Psycho" / "Keep a Knockin'" Released: 1965; 3. "The Witch" / "Psycho" Released: 1965; 4. "Boss Hoss" / "The Hustler" Released: May 1965; 5. "The Witch" / "Like No Other Man" Released: November 1966; 6. "Psycho" / "Maintaining My Cool" Released: February 1967

Here Are the Sonics is the debut album by American garage rock band the Sonics, released in March 1965. The album features the original songs "The Witch" (a minor regional hit), "Psycho", "Boss Hoss" and "Strychnine", along with an assortment of rock and roll and R&B covers.

== Release ==
Here Are the Sonics was released in 1965 by record label Etiquette. It was re-released in 1999 by Norton Records.

== Music ==
According to Loren DiBlasi of Paste, the album "scraped off whatever polish rock 'n' roll had accumulated and jammed a distorted boogie into the mix behind the deranged squawking of Gerry Roslie."

== Reception ==
Professional ratings
Review scores
Source	Rating
AllMusic	4.5/5 stars
Q	4/5 stars

Cub Koda of AllMusic wrote that the album "show[s] a live band at the peak of its power, ready to mow down the competition without even blinking twice", calling it "Another important chunk of Seattle rock and roll history."

Loren DiBlasi of Paste Magazine said: "The Sonics didn't just point the way toward a louder, more chaotic rock sound with their debut; they also helped define how a garage rock album was made, with limited mics and lots of bleed congealing into a primordial stew of barely controlled commotion. It added up to a pre-cursor to just about every style of late 20th-century rock 'n' roll, including punk, post-punk and grunge."

The album was included in Robert Dimery's 1001 Albums You Must Hear Before You Die.

== Track listing ==
Side A
No.	Title	Writer(s)	Length
1.	"The Witch"	Gerry Roslie	2:41
2.	"Do You Love Me"	Berry Gordy, Jr.	2:19
3.	"Roll Over Beethoven"	Chuck Berry	2:49
4.	"Boss Hoss"	Roslie	2:24
5.	"Dirty Robber" (The Fabulous Wailers cover)	John Greek, Kent Morrill, Rick Dangel	2:03
6.	"Have Love Will Travel"	Richard Berry	2:38

Side B
No.	Title	Writer(s)	Length
1.	"Psycho"	Roslie	2:18
2.	"Money (That's What I Want)"	Gordy, Jr., Janie Bradford	2:01
3.	"Walking the Dog"	Rufus Thomas	2:46
4.	"Night Time Is the Right Time"	Lew Herman	2:58
5.	"Strychnine"	Roslie	2:13
6.	"Good Golly Miss Molly"	John Marascalco, Robert Blackwell	2:09

Reissue bonus tracks
No.	Title	Writer(s)	Length
13.	"Keep A-Knockin'"	Perry Bradford	1:56
14.	"Don't Believe in Christmas" (patterned after "Too Much Monkey Business" by Chuck Berry)	Roslie	1:47
15.	"Santa Claus" (contains elements from "Farmer John" by the Premiers)	The Sonics	2:52
16.	"The Village Idiot" (cover of "Jingle Bells")		2:39

== Personnel ==
The Sonics

- Gerry Roslie – organ, piano, lead vocals
- Andy Parypa – bass guitar, vocals
- Larry Parypa – lead guitar, vocals
- Rob Lind – saxophone, vocals, harmonica
- Bob Bennett – drums

Technical

- Buck Ormsby – production
- Kent Morrill – production
- Kearney Barton – engineering
- John L. Vlahovich – sleeve design
- Pete Ciccone/Immaculate Concepts – sleeve layout
- Jini Dellaccio – cover photography
