= Don and the Goodtimes =

American garage rock band

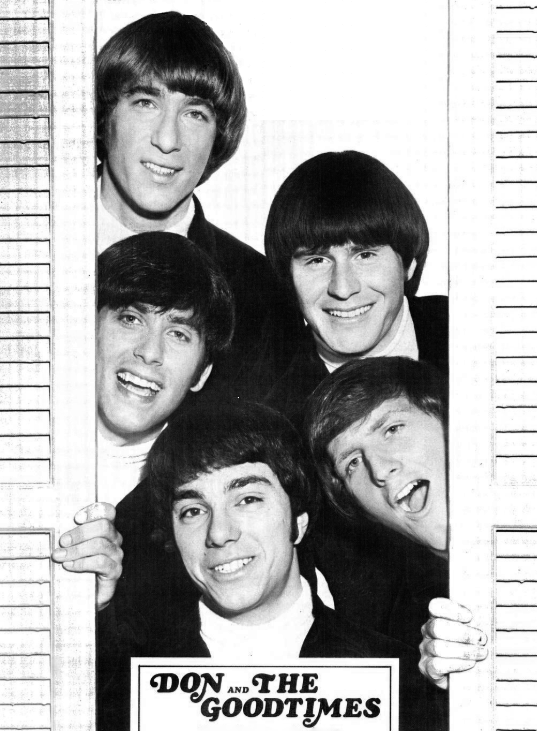
- Don and the Goodtimes in 1966. From top to bottom: Don McKinney, Charlie Coe, Rob Overman, Bobby Holden, Don Gallucci

Background information
- Origin: Portland, Oregon, United States
- Genres: Garage rock; R&B; pop
- Years active: 1964–1968
- Labels: Jerden; Wand; Dunhill; Epic
- Past members: Don Gallucci; Bobby Holden; Dave Child; Don McKinney; Jack Ely; Pierre Ouellette; Jim Valley; Charlie Coe; Ron "Buzz" Overman; Joey Newman; Jeff Hawks

Don and the Goodtimes were an American garage rock band, formed in Portland, Oregon, United States, in 1964. Fronted by Don Gallucci, former keyboardist of the Kingsmen, the group made a name for itself in the Northwest rock scene performing in a style similar to that of their contemporaries the Wailers and the Sonics. Over time Don and the Goodtimes honed their vocal harmonies and earned two hits on the Billboard Hot 100 in 1967, including their biggest hit, "I Could Be So Good to You". The band released their album, So Good, and later experimented with psychedelia under the moniker Touch before disbanding in 1969.

== History ==
Don Galluci (keyboards) was immersed in the Northwest rock scene early on as a member of the Kingsmen. He enjoyed early success with the band when they released the national hit, "Louie Louie", which features him playing the song's signature keyboard riff. However, Gallucci—just 15 years of age—was deemed too young to tour in support of the record and resigned from the group in early 1964. Gallucci formed his own band with Bobby Holden, a drummer he started jamming with at a nightclub called the Chase. Members from Holden's former band, the Invaders, joined the project, including Dave Child (bass guitar) and Don McKinney (saxophone, vocals). Ex-Kingsmen Jack Ely (vocals) performed with the group—albeit briefly—and Pierre Ouellette (lead guitar), a former guitarist for Paul Revere and the Raiders and future novelist, rounded-out the original Don and the Goodtimes line-up.

Thanks to Gallucci's connections in the music industry, the group was quickly signed by record producer Jerry Dennon of Jerden Records — the same producer of early Kingsmen recordings. The band traveled to Audio Recording Studio in Seattle to cover "Turn On", an instrumental piece that was garnering success for several local teen rock groups. "Turn On" was released on the A-side of the band's debut single and received airplay in the Northwest. Holden described Don and the Goodtimes early success: "We went on the road backing up this record and got some local airplay! We were an interesting band because we had these R&B roots but at the same time we realized that kids really liked show bands — like Paul Revere and the Raiders — so we amalgamated the two". For live performances, Don and the Goodtimes chose distinguishable attire—typically sporting suits and top hats. In 1965, after releasing their second single "There's Something On Your Mind", Jim Valley of the Viceroys was brought in to replace Ouellette and occasionally share lead vocals with McKinney.

The band in their signature top hats and jackets

Valley's role as a songwriter proved invaluable to the band on their next record, as he penned its A-side "Little Sally Tease". It furthered Don and the Goodtimes' popularity, and was covered by contemporaries such as the Standells and the Kingsmen. In mid-1965, the band was signed to Dunhill Records, and "Little Sally Tease" was released nationally. In 1966, the group made television appearances on the Lloyd Thaxton Show and Hollywood a-Go-Go, before commencing weekly performances on Dick Clark's show Where the Action Is. An album named after the program was recorded in the same year, and featured mainly renditions of popular tunes in the Northwest, including "Money (That's What I Want)", "The Witch", and "Jolly Green Giant". Commenting on Don and the Goodtimes' gritty R&B style, music critic Doug Shepherd wrote they "were one of the most adventurous bands in the region", and "perhaps the only band to cover 'The Witch' in a manner that did justice to the Sonics’ original".

Accepting an offer to join Paul Revere & the Raiders, Valley departed Don and the Goodtimes, and was replaced by Charlie Coe, another Raiders alumnus. Child and McKinney also left the band, and were substituted by Rob "Buzz" Overman and Jeff Hawks respectively. In 1967, the group settled in Los Angeles and began rehearsing their vocal harmonies in preparation for their next album. About this time Charlie Coe returned to the Raiders and was replaced by guitarist Joey Newman from the Northwest band The Liberty Tree. Joining them for recording was Jack Nitzsche, who produced and arranged the album, and A-list session musicians Ry Cooder, Glen Campbell, and Hal Blaine. The album, titled So Good, was released on Epic Records, and charted at 109 nationally on the Billboard 200. Its supporting single "I Could Be So Good to You" reached number 56 on the Billboard Hot 100, but fared better on Los Angeles's regional market, where it reached number 15. A non-album single "Happy and Me" was a minor hit, peaking at number 98.

Don and the Goodtimes released three more singles in 1968, none of which managed to continue their success. Overman and Holden left the group later in the year, effectively disbanding the band. Gallucci formed another band with Hawks and Newman and new members Bruce Hauser (bass guitar, vocals) and John Bordonaro (drums, vocals), naming it Touch. Refashioning themselves as a psychedelic rock troupe, Touch released one self-titled album in 1969. The group—unable to replicate their complex studio sound—refused to tour in support of the album and as a result sales were poor. Touch disbanded soon after. Gallucci went on to become a successful record producer, working most notably on the Stooges' second album Fun House, in 1970.

== Members ==
- Don Gallucci — keyboards (1964—1968)
- Bobby Holden — drums (1964—1968)
- Dave Child — bass (1964—1966)
- Don McKinney — lead vocals, saxophone (1964—1966)
- Jack Ely — vocals (1964)
- Pierre Ouellette — guitar (1964—1965)
- Jim Valley — guitar (1965—1966)
- Charlie Coe — guitar (1966—1967)
- Rob Overman — bass (1966—1968)
- Jeff Hawks — lead vocals, saxophone (1966—1968)
- Joey Newman — guitar (1967—1968)

== Discography ==
=== Albums ===
Year	Label	Title	Billboard 200
1967	Wand	Where The Action Is!!	
1967	Epic	So Good	#109

=== Singles ===
Year	Month	Label	A-side	B-side	Hot 100
1964	October	Wand	"Turn On"	"Make It"	
1965	May	Wand	"There's Something On Your Mind"	"Straight Scepter"	
1965	June	Jerden	"Little Sally Tease"	"You'll Never Walk Alone"	
1965	August	Dunhill	"Little Sally Tease"	"Little Green Thing"	
1965	October	Dunhill	"Big Big Knight (On A Big White Horse)"	"I'll Be Down Forever"	
1966	January	Dunhill	"Sweets for My Sweet"	"Hey There, Mary Mae"	
1966	May	Jerden	"Blue Turns To Grey"	"I'm Real"	
1966	July	Jerden	"You Were A Child"	"I Hate To Hate You"	
1966	October	Piccadilly	"You Were Just A Child"	"I Hate To Hate You"	
1967	March 16	Epic	"I Could Be So Good To You"	"And It's So Good"	#56
1967	June 23	Epic	"Happy And Me"	"If You Love Her, Cherish Her And Such"	#98
1967	October 6	Epic	"Bambi"	"Sally!! (Studio A at 6 O'Clock in the Morning)"	
1968	January 5	Epic	"May My Heart Be Cast Into Stone"	"Ball Of Fire"	
1968	March	Epic	"You Did It Before"	"Colors Of Life"	
