= 1970: The Complete Fun House Sessions =

Box set by The Stooges
- Released: 1999
- Recorded: 11–25 May 1970 at Elektra Sound Recorders, LA
- Genres: Proto-punk; hard rock; experimental rock; punk jazz; garage rock
- Length: 7:52:00
- Label: Rhino Handmade
- Producers: Don Gallucci (original session); Roland Worthington Hand (compilation)

The Stooges chronology
Metallic K.O. (1976)	1970: The Complete Fun House Sessions (1999)	Skull Ring (2003)

1970: The Complete Fun House Sessions is a seven-CD limited edition boxed set that commemorates and chronicles the entire session for Fun House, the second studio album by American proto-punk band The Stooges.

== The original album ==
Although when originally released, Fun House was not a big seller for either the band or Elektra Records, the album ended up being a favorite of critics like Lester Bangs and magazines like Creem. The album's reputation (as well as that of its eponymous predecessor and its 1973 follow up Raw Power) grew with the advent of punk, as the likes of Ramones, Sex Pistols and The Clash mentioned The Stooges in general, and Fun House in particular, as a major influence. Henry Rollins devoted most of a Spin magazine column to the album in 1985, furthering the reputation of the album, which was quietly put back in print not long afterward, with the first compact disc reissue occurring in 1988.

== About the box set ==
1970: The Complete Fun House Sessions was compiled from thirteen reels of multi-track reel-to-reel tape. Twelve reels of tape had been used during the sessions; the thirteenth reel was the one that held the takes that would be used for the album. In 1999, Rhino house engineers Bill Inglot and Dan Hersch mixed down every tape from end to end, placing the master takes that had been used for the master reel of the album back onto their original positions for the boxed set.

Six of the seven CDs in the box set contain every recording from the sessions. This includes not only multiple versions of all songs but also false starts, tune-ups and jokes or conversations between the musicians and producer. The seventh CD replicates the original "Down on the Street / 1970" mono 45 rpm single, featuring edited versions of the aforementioned tracks. The single version of "Down On The Street" features overdubbed organ, most likely played by producer Don Gallucci, who had played the same instrument when he was a member of The Kingsmen on their notorious garage rock classic "Louie Louie" (which the band would cover on the Metallic K.O. live album.)

For the liner notes, Stooges expert Ben Edmonds interviewed all of the surviving Stooges as well as several others who either were involved with or who admire the original album, including Henry Rollins. Instead of a book, this boxed set features Edmonds' extensive liner notes printed a section at a time across each of the first six discs' jewel case inserts.

The outer lid of the boxed set incorporates the original Fun House album artwork, while the inner box replicates the look of a cardboard record shipping box with the Elektra "stencil E" logo on the side, and the inserts of the first six CDs reproduce the front covers of the original session reels. The seventh CD is packaged in a reproduction of a plain paper 7" 45 sleeve.

1970: The Complete Fun House Sessions was one of the early releases from Rhino Records' limited-edition imprint Rhino Handmade. It was released in a one-time pressing of 3000 copies, sold out within a year of its release, and helped fully establish Rhino Handmade's reputation for collector's-interest releases. The set was re-released in November 2010 by Rhino Handmade and is not individually numbered to maintain the collectability of the original release.

In 2005, highlights from the many unreleased tracks on the album, plus the single versions of "Down On The Street" and "1970", were compiled by Rhino for use on the second disc of the deluxe double-CD reissue of Fun House. The box set was also reissued in digital download form on August 27, 2005 exclusively at the iTunes Music Store, to commemorate Rhino Records' 27th Anniversary. The box set is also notable for the long version of "L.A. Blues" titled "Freak", clocking in at over 17 minutes in length and featuring a more aggressive performance than the official release.

== Track listing ==
=== Disc one ===
1. "Fun House" (Tape glitch fragment) – 0:22
2. "Studio dialogue" – 0:39
3. "1970" (Incomplete) – 1:51
4. "Studio dialogue" – 0:20
5. "1970 take 1" – 7:04
6. "1970 take 2" – 3:05
7. "Studio dialogue" – 0:30
8. "1970 take 3" – 7:35
9. "1970 take 4" – 6:02
10. "Studio dialogue" – 0:14
11. "Loose" (Demo) – 1:14
12. "Studio dialogue" – 0:06
13. "1970 take 5" – 5:48
14. "Loose take 1" (labeled as "I'm Loose") (False start) – 1:37
15. "Loose take 2" – 3:41
16. "Down on the Street take 1" – 2:05
17. "Studio dialogue" – 0:12
18. "Loose take 3" – 3:45
19. "Down on the Street take 2" (False start) – 3:31
20. "Down on the Street take 3" (False start) – 0:21
21. "Studio dialogue" – 0:34
22. "See That Cat" ("T.V. Eye") – 5:15
23. "Studio dialogue" – 0:11
24. "1970 take 1" – 6:27
25. "Fun House take 1" – 10:23
26. "Studio dialogue" – 0:09
27. "Lost in the Future" (False start) – 0:27
28. "Studio dialogue" – 0:08
29. "Lost in the Future" (False start) – 1:10

=== Disc two ===
1. "Lost in the Future take 1" – 5:42
2. "Studio dialogue" – 0:11
3. "Lost in the Future take 2" (False start) – 1:22
4. "Lost in the Future take 3" – 4:35
5. "Studio dialogue" – 0:15
6. "Loose take 1" – 3:38
7. "Studio dialogue" – 0:19
8. "1970 take 1" – 6:18
9. "Loose take 2" – 3:41
10. "Loose take 3" (False start) – 0:26
11. "Studio dialogue" – 0:32
12. "Loose take 4" – 3:38
13. "Studio dialogue" – 0:14
14. "Loose take 5" – 3:39
15. "Studio dialogue" – 0:08
16. "Loose take 6" – 3:43
17. "Loose take 7" (False start) – 1:10
18. "Loose take 9" – 3:41
19. "Loose take 11" – 3:41
20. "Loose take 12" – 3:42
21. "Loose take 13" – 3:47
22. "Loose take 14" – 3:42
23. "Loose take 15" – 3:42
24. "Slide" ("Slidin' the Blues") – 4:35
25. "Studio dialogue" – 0:12
26. "Loose take 16" – 3:44
27. "Loose take 17" (False start) – 0:27
28. "Loose take 18" (False start) – 1:00
29. "Loose take 19" – 3:38

=== Disc three ===
1. "Loose take 20" – 3:42
2. "Studio dialogue" – 0:20
3. "Loose take 21" (False start) – 3:15
4. "Studio dialogue" – 0:44
5. "Loose take 22" – 3:40
6. "Studio dialogue" – 0:14
7. "Loose take 23" – 3:42
8. "Loose take 24" – 3:44
9. "Loose take 25" (False start) – 3:14
10. "Loose take 26" (False start) – 1:59
11. "Studio dialogue" – 0:13
12. "Loose take 27" – 3:38
13. "Loose take 28" – 3:34
14. "Down on the Street take 1" – 3:57
15. "Down on the Street take 2" – 4:11
16. "Down on the Street take 3" – 4:08
17. "Down on the Street take 4" – 4:15
18. "Studio dialogue" – 0:07
19. "Down on the Street take 5" – 4:14
20. "Studio dialogue" – 0:19
21. "Down on the Street take 6" – 4:23
22. "Down on the Street take 7" (False start) – 0:21
23. "Down on the Street take 8" – 4:16
24. "Down on the Street take 9" (False start) – 0:25
25. "Down on the Street take 10" – 4:25
26. "Down on the Street take 11" (False start) – 0:41
27. "Studio dialogue" – 0:27
28. "Down on the Street take 12" (False start) – 1:23
29. "Down on the Street take 13" – 4:01
30. "Down on the Street take 14" (False start)– 2:11
31. "Down on the Street take 15" – 3:42

=== Disc four ===
1. "T.V. Eye take 1" – 5:21
2. "T.V. Eye take 2" (False start) – 4:29
3. "Slide" ("Slidin' The Blues") – 1:00
4. "T.V. Eye take 3" – 5:29
5. "T.V. Eye take 4" (False start) – 0:33
6. "T.V. Eye take 5" – 5:55
7. "T.V. Eye take 6" – 5:43
8. "Studio dialogue" – 0:26
9. "T.V. Eye take 7 – 5:21
10. "T.V. Eye take 8" – 5:21
11. "Studio dialogue" – 0:17
12. "T.V. Eye take 9" – 4:17
13. "T.V. Eye take 10" (False start) – 0:12
14. "T.V. Eye take 11" – 4:16
15. "T.V. Eye take 12" – 4:46
16. "T.V. Eye take 13" – 4:17
17. "T.V. Eye take 14" – 4:40
18. "Studio dialogue" – 0:17
19. "1970 take 1" – 5:28
20. "Studio dialogue" – 0:13
21. "1970 take 2" – 5:19
22. "Studio dialogue" – 0:10
23. "1970 take 3" – 5:09

=== Disc five ===
1. "1970 take 4" – 5:44
2. "Studio dialogue" – 0:23
3. "1970 take 5" – 5:24
4. "1970 take 6" (False start) – 1:00
5. "1970 take 7" – 5:44
6. "1970 take 8" – 5:15
7. "Fun House take 1" (False start)– 3:09
8. "Fun House take 2" – 10:15
9. "Fun House take 3" – 11:19
10. "Studio dialogue" – 0:39
11. "Fun House take 4" – 8:21
12. "Fun House take 5" – 7:45
13. "Studio dialogue" – 0:38
14. "Dirt take 1" – 7:29
15. "Dirt take 2" – 7:04

=== Disc six ===
1. "Dirt take 3" – 7:03
2. "Studio dialogue" – 0:29
3. "Dirt take 4" – 7:06
4. "Dirt take 5" – 6:38
5. "Dirt take 6" – 6:37
6. "Dirt take 7" (False start) – 0:44
7. "Dirt take 8" – 6:51
8. "Dirt take 9" – 6:55
9. "Dirt take 10" – 7:07
10. "Dirt take 11" (False start) – 0:07
11. "Dirt take 12" – 7:00 – 7:02
12. "Freak [Later Titled "L.A. Blues"] take 1" – 17:24
13. "Freak [Later Titled "L.A. Blues"] take 2" – 4:55

=== Disc seven ===
1. "Down on the Street" (Mono single edit) – 2:42
2. "I Feel Alright (1970)" (Mono single edit) – 3:18
