= Monyaka =

American reggae band

- Origin: Brooklyn, New York, United States
- Genres: Reggae, funk
- Years active: 1974–present
- Labels: Hevyaka, Easy Street, A&M, Vanguard
- Members: Beres Barnett (vocals, guitar); Errol Moore (guitar); John Allen (keyboards); William Brown (keyboards); Larry McDonald (percussion); Val Douglas (bass); Richie Bertram (drums)

Monyaka is an American reggae band formed in Brooklyn, New York that was most active during the 1980s and early 1990s.

== History ==
Monyaka was founded in 1974 by guitarist/singer Errol Moore as the Soul Supersonics, the members originally from Jamaica. The band spent most of their time backing up visiting reggae stars before setting up their own record label, Hevyaka, in 1977 and releasing single "Rocking Time" and album Classical Roots.

It took five years for further releases to come out of the group, by which time the group had renamed to Monyaka (Swahili for "good luck"); in 1982, they released "Stand Up Strong". This itself was not particularly successful, however follow-up single "Go Deh Yaka" was a no. 14 hit in the UK, with then current bass player Paul 'Computer Paul' Henton and no. 48 on the Billboard Dance Music/Club Play Singles. They then released Reggaenomics, which, while unsuccessful, spawned Monyaka's final appearance on any chart; "Reggaematic Funk", which made no. 83 in the UK.

Monyaka is highly respected as one of the promulgators of the Brooklyn reggae sound and during the late 1970s and early 1980s were the most requested backing band, backing musicians such as Dennis Brown, Burning Spear, Black Uhuru, Marcia Griffiths, The Mighty Diamonds, Culture, The Meditations, Ken Boothe, Steel Pulse, Peter Tosh and Jimmy Cliff.

== Discography ==
=== Albums ===
- Classical Roots (1983), Hevyaka
- Reggaenomics (1984), Easy Street

=== Singles ===
- "Rocking Time" (1977), May Dawn
- "Dread for Some" (1977), Hevyaka
- "Another Love" (1981), Medious - B-side of "Never Love Another" by Nagasa feat. Mill Henry
- "Stand Up Strong" (1982), Mutiny Shadow International
- "Go Deh Yaka (Go To the Top)" (1983), Easy Street/Polydor/BCM - UK no. 14, Billboard Dance Music/Club Play Singles no. 48
- "Reggaematic Funk" (1983), Easy Street - UK no. 83
- "Go Deh Yaka" (1984), Taxi
- "Got The Beat For Christmas" (1985), A&M - Monyaka presents deejays Hollywood And Tango
- "Round the Corner" (1985), Kaya
- "Street People (It Ain't Easy)" (1985), A&M
- "Do You Know" (198?), High Steppers
