= Easy Street Records =

Record store in Seattle, Washington

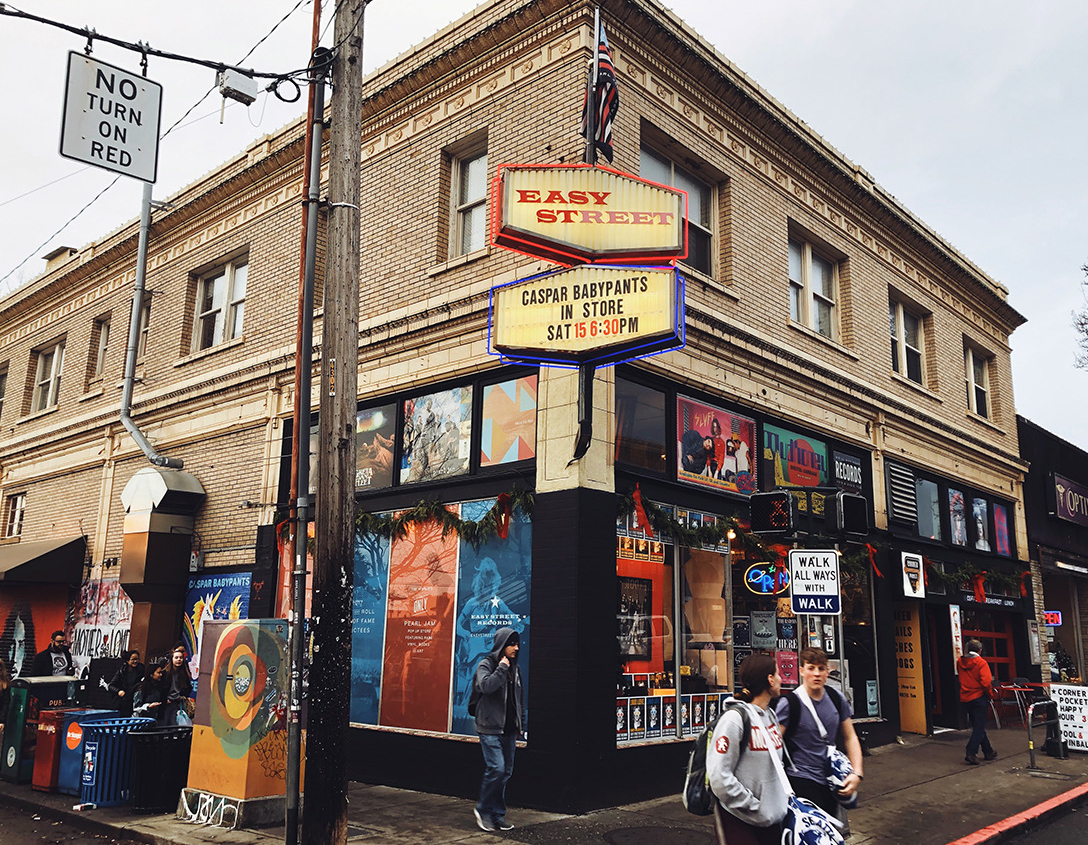
Easy Street Records

Easy Street Records is an independent record store located in Seattle, Washington. Easy Street opened its store in West Seattle in 1988, and later added a cafe/bar, which serves coffee, breakfast, lunch, beer, wine, and cocktails. Easy Street Records often hosts live in-store performances by national and local musicians. The store carries new and used vinyl records, CDs, DVDs, new books, magazines, t-shirts and company-branded merchandise. In 2018, Rolling Stone named Easy Street one of the ten best record stores in the US. The publication also included the store in its 2010 article "Best Record Stores In the USA". Time magazine featured the store in its article "10 Great American Record Shops" On October 10, 2012, Easy Street was named King County's "Best Small Business" in the 2nd annual King County Executive's Small Business Awards. In November 2012, Seattle mayor Mike McGinn "recognized Easy Street Records for their stability, longevity, and involvement in Seattle's music community, while embodying Seattle's pioneering spirit and reflecting Seattle at its best." In 2017, the Travel Channel named Easy Street one of "Eight Must-Visit American Record Stores". In 2023, Easy Street was named West Seattle's Business Of The Year by the West Seattle Chamber Of Commerce at their annual Westside Awards presentation. Easy Street is a member of the Coalition of Independent Music Stores (CIMS) and a founding member of Record Store Day. In May of 2026, the Music Business Association honored Easy Street with the prestigious Indie Retailer of the Year award.

== History ==
The original Easy Street records was opened in Bellevue, Washington by Kim Harris and his wife Diana Vaughan Harris and during the 1980s it became a popular hangout for members of the Eastside's heavy metal scene. Queensrÿche brought their first demo to the Harrises who would help them record their debut EP and manage the band from 1982 to 1986.

Matt Vaughan, Harris' stepson, worked at his family's record store throughout his teen years. In 1987, with his parents wanting to close the shop to focus on their management company (Harris Music Group) and the other store he worked at ready to go out of business simultaneously, Vaughan approached both owners and offered to consolidate the two stores into one.

Vaughan opened the new Easy Street Records in the business district of West Seattle (known as "The Junction") at some point in late 1987 and in August of 1989 moved the store to its current location in the historic Hamm Building, in a space previously occupied by a drug store on the primary corner of the Junction. In the early 90s, Vaughan managed local Grunge band Gruntruck and worked as a booking agent, using the income from these extra gigs to subsidize the store and open his first branch store at the Park Place shopping center in Kirkland, which operated from 1992 to about 2001.

=== In-Store Performances, Easy Street Cafe, & Queen Anne Store ===
In 1997, Vaughan leased the space next door (previously Joe's Grill) and turned it into a free all-ages venue hosting in-store performances by such acts as Mudhoney, Rocket From The Crypt, Luna, Dog's Eye View, among others. Easy Street had hosted a few in-stores prior to the expansion, but the additional room enabled the store to upgrade the sound and lighting, and increase capacity, making these events feel more like real shows. These early in-stores inspired Vaughan to reconfigure the store to host bands and artists on a more regular basis. To date, Easy Street has hosted over 2,000 in-store performances.

In 1999, the kitchen was remodeled, a coffee bar was installed, and they opened a full-service cafe opening at 7am. It is among the most popular brunch destinations in Seattle, serving a large selection of music-themed menu items (e.g., James Browns, Dolly Parton Stack, Johnny Cash Special, Notorious B&G, Soundgarden Burger). The cafe is also a popular choice for "grab-n-go" espresso drinks. In March 2012 the Seattle Metropolitan magazine added the cafe to their "Breakfast Hall of Fame". In December 2017 it was also featured in an episode of the Travel Channel's Man v. Food, hosted by Casey Webb. In 2022, Easy Street opened a cocktail bar and lounge upstairs in their vinyl room. Among their signature drinks are the Proud Mary, My Paloma, and Harder They Rum. They also offer rotating beer selections on tap and a selection of Northwest wines. Customers are free to walk through the store with their "walktails," sit outside in the new patio area, or at the bar itself.

In 2002 Vaughan opened a second, much larger store in the former Tower Books location on Mercer Street in Seattle's Queen Anne neighborhood. The new store provided the extra room Vaughan needed to build a stage and soon national touring artists began performing there, including Lou Reed, Elvis Costello, Kings of Leon, Patti Smith, Paul Westerberg, Franz Ferdinand, Lana Del Rey, Dierks Bentley, Robyn, Jack Johnson, Jurassic 5, Wanda Jackson, Steve Earle, Regina Spektor, John Doe, Dick Dale, My Morning Jacket and many others. Easy Street is a strong supporter of Northwest artists, and has hosted in-store performances by Mudhoney, the Shins, Macklemore, the Cave Singers, Brandi Carlile, Shabazz Palaces, Ayron Jones, Damien Jurado, Presidents of the USA, Minus the Bear, Band of Horses, the Head & the Heart and Blue Scholars, to name but a few.

=== Live At Easy Street ===
On April 25, 2005, Easy Street was chosen to host the national ten-year anniversary conference for CIMS (the Coalition of Independent Music Stores), an independent record retailers convention and Pearl Jam guitarist Mike McCready felt the band could do something special as a "thank you" gesture to these retailers. Vaughan proposed a surprise, invite-only in-store performance at the intimate West Seattle location. During one of several meetings with the band's management about logistics, Pearl Jam singer Eddie Vedder showed up and stated his desire to make it work, and the show was confirmed soon after. On April 29, the retailers were bussed to the West Seattle store for what was described as a "work party". The band appeared, much to everyone's surprise, and proceeded to play a special set for the crowd of 200. This event and the subsequent exclusive release is considered to be one of the catalysts that helped create Record Store Day in 2007. KEXP's Kevin Cole stated, "Pearl Jam’s in-store — and their insistence that the Live at Easy Street EP be exclusive to independent stores — helped create the momentum for the creation of Record Store Day.” Pearl Jam later decided to release a special EP of the highlights from the show. Titled Live at Easy Street, its two CD pressings sold out, and remained out of print for over a decade until April 13, 2019, when it was finally released on vinyl for Record Store Day. It was the best selling record on Record Store Day 2019 and the following week.

The following artists have also released albums recorded at Easy Street:

- Gov't Mule - Mule on Easy Street (2006)
- Brandi Carlile - Live at Easy Street Records (2007)
- The Sonics - Live At Easy Street (2016)
- Duff McKagan - Live At Easy Street (2023)
- Brandi Carlile - Live At Easy Street Vol. 2 (2026)

In addition, several artists have recorded their in-store performances for radio broadcasts, including Elvis Costello, the Shins, My Morning Jacket and Brad.

=== Queen Anne Store closure ===
On January 2, 2013, owner Matt Vaughan announced the closure of Easy Street's Queen Anne store, effective January 18, 2013. Vaughan cited a significant increase in rent as the primary reason for the closure. In his statement Vaughan added that Chase Bank would be the new tenant. On closing night, Yo La Tengo played to a packed house for the final in-store at the Queen Anne location.

=== The Sonics (And Guests) At Easy Street ===
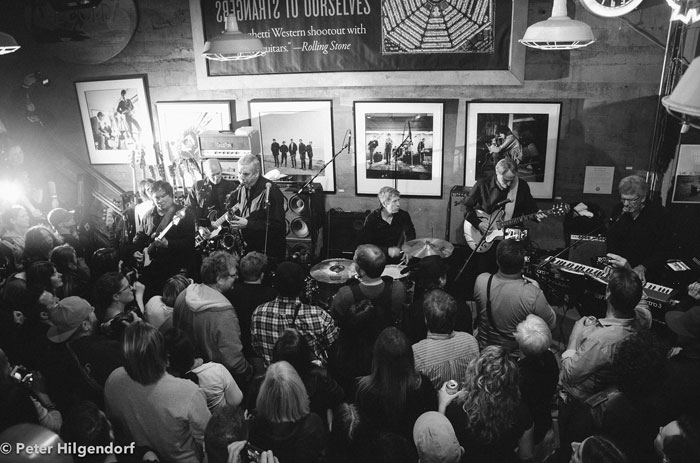
The Sonics perform at Easy Street Records on Record Store Day 2015

On April 18, 2015, Easy Street presented a special Record Store Day in-store performance by the legendary Northwest band, the Sonics, who had just released their first album in nearly 40 years, This Is The Sonics. Tickets went on sale the day before the event, with all proceeds going toward funding Seattle radio station KEXP's move to larger headquarters at the Seattle Center. The event was billed as the Sonics (and Special Guests), which raised a great deal of speculation and excitement about who the guests would be. At 10 pm on Record Store Day, with the store packed to capacity, the Sonics took the stage, and as night went on, they welcomed Pearl Jam's Eddie Vedder and Mike McCready, Chris Ballew (Presidents of the USA), Ben Shepherd (Soundgarden), Van Conner & Mark Pickerel (Screaming Trees), original Sonics bassist Andy Parypa, Calvin Johnson (Beat Happening), Matt Lukin (Mudhoney), Emily Nokes (Tacocat), Bill "Kahuna" Henderson (Girl Trouble), and Rod Moody (Swallow). KEXP recorded and filmed the entire event, and the album The Sonics Live At Easy Street was released on vinyl April 16, 2016.

=== Sasquatch! Music Festival ===
From 2003 to 2018 Easy Street was the exclusive retailer for the Sasquatch! Music Festival, which took place every Memorial Day weekend in George, Washington. Each year the Easy Street Sasquatch! booth hosted signing sessions with many of the festival's top performers. Sasquatch! helped launch many of the region's most famed artists. Sasquatch founder Adam Zacks discontinued the festival in 2018, but in 2021 he launched his next venture, the Thing Festival, a three-day music festival in Port Townsend, Washington. In 2023, Easy Street was announced as the retail sponsor for Thing Festival.

== Murals ==
Easy Street is well known for its large eye-catching hand-painted murals on its exterior walls. For years, they were regularly updated with covers of the most recent music releases, but eventually Easy Street settled on two murals that would remain permanently. The first, a mural paying tribute to Mother Love Bone and its late vocalist Andrew Wood, was hand painted by the band's bassist Jeff Ament, now with Pearl Jam. The second, of Soundgarden vocalist Chris Cornell, was designed by Jeff Ament, Barry Ament, and Joe Spix, and hand painted by acclaimed artist Son Duong. Easy Street owner Matt Vaughan explained, “We just didn’t have the heart to replace either of these two, they were too special to this neighborhood and the Northwest community. Those are here for as long as we are”.
