= Boom (The Sonics album) =

Studio album by the Sonics
- Released: February 1966
- Recorded: 1965–1966
- Studio: Wiley-Griffith, Tacoma, Washington
- Genre: Garage rock; proto-punk
- Length: 30:59
- Label: Etiquette
- Producer: Kent Morrill; Buck Ormsby

The Sonics chronology
Here Are the Sonics (1965)	Boom (1966)	Introducing the Sonics (1967)

Singles from BOOM
- 1. "Shot Down" / "Don't Be Afraid of the Dark" Released: July 1965; 2. "Cinderella" / "Louie Louie" Released: October 1965

Boom is the second studio album by the American garage rock band the Sonics, released in February 1966.

== Release ==
Boom was released in 1966 by record label Etiquette ET-ALBS-027.

It was re-released in 1999 by Norton Records NW 905.

== Reception ==
Professional ratings
Review scores
Source	Rating
AllMusic	4.5/5 stars

Cub Koda of AllMusic called the album "every bit as explosive and influential as their debut outing". They rated it 4 1/2 stars.

== Legacy ==
Like its predecessor Here Are the Sonics (1965), Boom was influential on later punk rock music (see protopunk).

== Track listing ==
Side A
No.	Title	Writer(s)	Length
1.	"Cinderella"	Gerry Roslie	2:39
2.	"Don't Be Afraid of the Dark"	Gerry Roslie	2:16
3.	"Skinny Minnie"	Bill Haley, Milt Gabler, Rusty Keefer, Catherine Cafra	2:11
4.	"Let the Good Times Roll"	Leonard Lee	1:56
5.	"Don't You Just Know It"	Huey "Piano" Smith, John Vincent	2:49
6.	"Jenny, Jenny"	Enotris Johnson, Little Richard	2:16

Side B
No.	Title	Writer(s)	Length
1.	"He's Waitin'"	Gerry Roslie	2:35
2.	"Louie, Louie"	Richard Berry	2:52
3.	"Since I Fell for You"	Buddy Johnson	3:55
4.	"Hitch Hike"	Marvin Gaye, William Stevenson, Clarence Paul	2:41
5.	"It's All Right"	Chris Andrews	2:10
6.	"Shot Down"	Gerry Roslie	2:08

Reissue bonus tracks
No.	Title	Writer(s)	Length
13.	"The Hustler"	Gerry Roslie	2:03
14.	"The Witch (Alternate Take)"	Gerry Roslie	2:36
15.	"Psycho (Live)"	Gerry Roslie	1:55
16.	"The Witch (Live)"	Gerry Roslie	2:54

== Personnel ==
The Sonics

- Gerry Roslie – keyboard, vocals
- Andy Parypa – bass guitar, vocals
- Larry Parypa – lead guitar, vocals
- Rob Lind – saxophone, vocals
- Bob Bennett – drums

Technical

- Kent Morrill – Production
- Buck Ormsby – Production
- Bill Wiley - Engineer
