= Tall Cool One =

Tall Cool One may refer to:

- Tall Cool One (novel), the fourth novel in the "A-List" series by Zoey Dean 2005
- "Tall Cool One" (The Fabulous Wailers song), 1959 and 1964
- "Tall Cool One" (Robert Plant song) 1988
