= Jini Dellaccio =

American photographer

- Jini Dellacio, self-portrait
- Born: 31 January 1917; Indiana, U.S.
- Died: 3 July 2014 (aged 97)
- Occupation: Photographer
- Website: jinidellaccio.com

Jini Dellaccio (née Duckworth; January 31, 1917 – July 3, 2014) was an American photographer best known for her images of rock and pop acts of the 1960s, particularly in the Pacific Northwest. Her photographs of the Sonics, the Wailers, Merrilee Rush, the Daily Flash and many others were frequently used for album covers, posters, and publicity stills, and - along with her shots of major acts such as Neil Young, the Rolling Stones, the Beach Boys, and The Who - have been widely reproduced in books, CDs, articles, and gallery exhibitions.

== Early life and career ==
Born and raised on a family farm in Indiana, Jini (pronounced "Jeanie") Duckworth's father was an auto mechanic and her mother was a beautician. Her large family was artistically and musically inclined. Jini's mother was a self-taught violinist, her father played drums, and her sister played piano. After graduating from high school in 1935 she played saxophone with a number of different all-girl Swing jazz touring revues for 12 years.

While performing in Hollywood, Florida with the Sweathearts of Swing during World War II, she met her husband-to-be, Carl Dellaccio, who was serving in the Navy. “We talked every night. That was the end of it for me," Jini said. After the war the couple moved to Chicago, Illinois, where Carl attended the University of Chicago, via the GI Bill. After they married in 1946, Jini continued playing music professionally for a while, then began attending the Art Institute of Chicago, where she studied painting and became interested in photography, purchasing a $70 used Leica at Altman's, a Chicago camera shop.

In 1953, the couple moved to Long Beach, California where Carl had been offered a high school level Spanish and Italian teaching job. Jini did pottery for a while before developing a successful career as a freelance fashion photographer. During this period she purchased a Rolleiflex camera, and then a Hasselblad 500-C, which (though she would occasionally use other types) became her primary camera. The resulting photos, Dellaccio said, were “absolutely gorgeous.” A model, as pleased with the shots as Dellaccio, showed them to one of her Hollywood connections, who said, “Now he is a photographer.” The model took great pleasure in telling him, “This happens to be a lady”. From that point on, Dellaccio was seen as a symbol of gender equality and excellence in the music/photography industry. "Anything they'd ask – ‘Oh yes, I can do that,’” Dellaccio said. “And I would do it." In 1958, she joined her brother Paul on a tour of the South Sea Islands and took along her Leica, capturing one of her most cherished images, of the Tasman Sea. The fashion gig lasted ten years, ending when Carl was offered a job with the Tacoma, Washington Public Schools district in 1961. The couple moved to nearby Gig Harbor. In 1962 the Tacoma Art Museum exhibited some of Dellaccio's work, including fashion photos and pictures taken on the South Pacific excursion.

== Rock and roll photographer ==
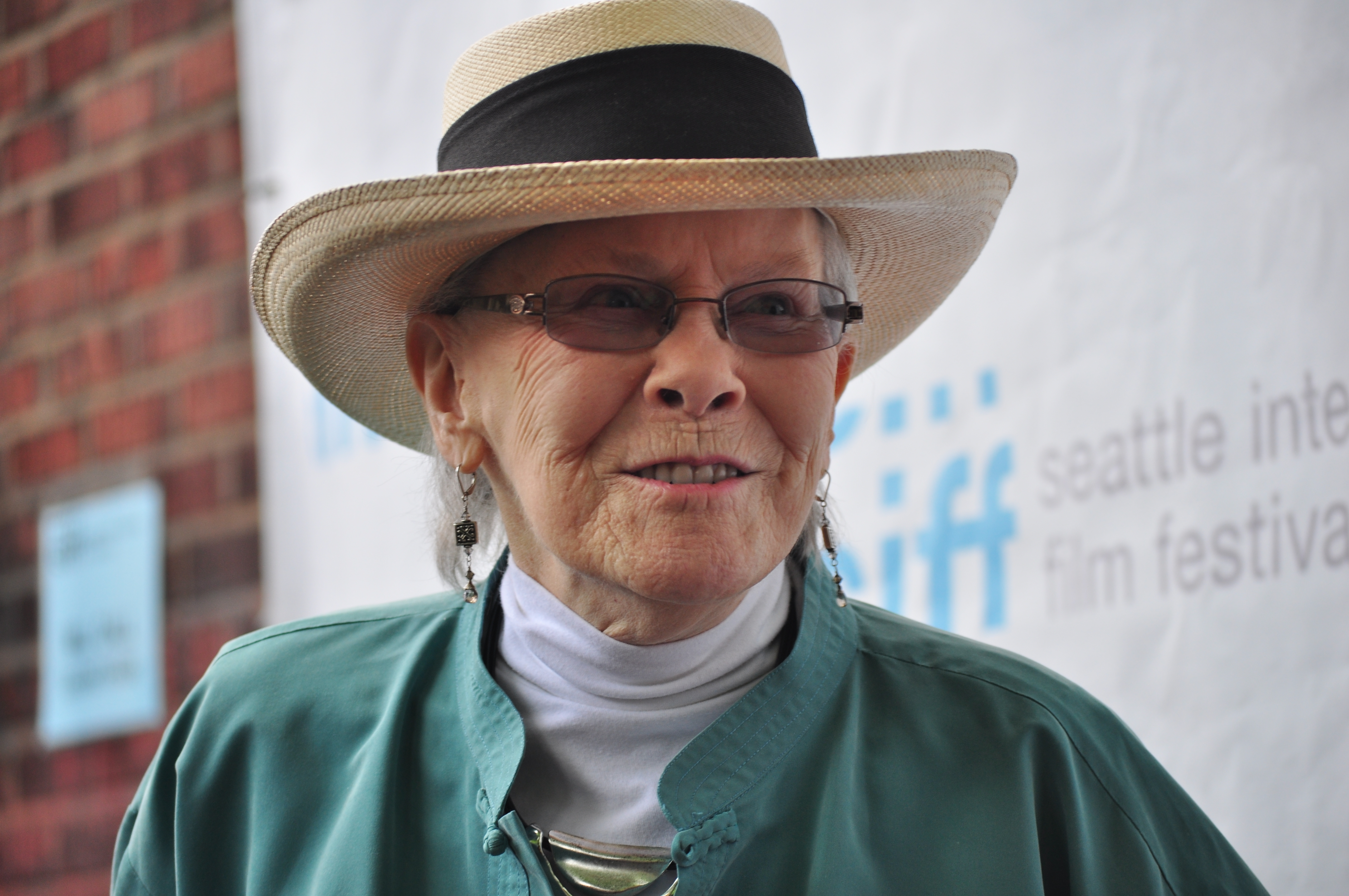
Dellaccio, 2013

By 1964 the members of one of the Northwest's most popular rock bands, the Wailers, based in Tacoma, were looking to upgrade the quality of the cover art of their records, which they released on their own label, Etiquette Records. They contacted graphic designer John Vlahovich, who recommended they speak to promotions-man Barrie R. Jackson. Jackson had seen Dellaccio's exhibit at the Tacoma Art Museum, and suggested that they ask her to do the album cover shoot. She agreed, but instead of photographing them at her home studio, she had them walk around a local park. The resultant photos were used on the Vlahovich-designed cover of the album Wailers, Wailers, Everywhere, which was a regional best-seller. Dellaccio was soon in high demand, her photographic style seeming to have captured what DJ and concert impresario Pat O'Day described as "the Northwest cool".

Although 20 or more years older than most of her subjects, Dellaccio felt an affinity for the Northwest's rough-edged proto-punk music scene and its characters. Avoiding the standard, formal studio techniques of the time, she frequently photographed bands outdoors, and utilized the unique background of the Pacific Northwest as the frame for her album cover shoots. "I started doing pictures, started getting inspired. Because I could see how beautiful these kids looked out in the trees," she said. Dellaccio's signature approach was to have the bands climbing trees, peering through the mist, or surrounded by great works of architecture and sculpture in their Beatle boots. The intrinsic weather, namely the mist, of the Northwest was a recurring feature in her photography. Her black-and-white images of sharply-dressed young musicians, sometimes clowning but more often skulking in naturally beautiful settings created an unusual and distinctive look. Dellaccio did not limit her work to the outdoors. She utilized a variety of different spaces. Her in-studio work often made use of moody lighting and staggered, non-uniform poses. Her photography also featured locations such as the University of Washington, where she photographed musicians at iconic sites such as Red Square, Suzzallo Library, and the 4 Pillars. Her unique style placed her firmly in the vanguard of a new and more creative style of commercial photography that would take root in the late 1960s and 1970s.

Among the dozens of Northwest bands she photographed were Merrilee Rush & the Turnabouts, Paul Revere and the Raiders, the Galaxies, Don and the Goodtimes, Mr. Lucky and the Gamblers, the Bootmen, the Bards, the Daily Flash, Emergency Exit, Bodine, and City Zu. Her images of the Sonics and the Wailers, in particular, have become garage-rock icons.

In addition to session work, Dellaccio's attraction to the burgeoning music scene led her to documenting live performances by both regional acts and touring stars such as the Rolling Stones, the Yardbirds, the Who, Herman's Hermits, the Shangri-Las, the Lovin' Spoonful, the Beach Boys, the Mamas and the Papas, Gary Lewis & the Playboys, Johnny Rivers, and others. Recalled Wailers bassist Buck Ormsby: "[She was] asked to do some publicity shots. The next thing I know, she's taking pictures of everyone: the Wailers, Sonics, everyone. And it wasn't that she just started shooting publicity shots, she was going to gigs, hanging out; it was like she just fell in love with the music."

As notice of Dellaccio's skills spread, she occasionally travelled to California for jobs, including a memorable 1967 session with Neil Young, which was featured in Neal Young News, 2009. "[Jini] said, 'If you get on the roof, we'd have the sky'. So he said, 'I can get up there all right. Now what?' And [Jini] said, 'Fly like a bird.'"

She continued regularly photographing bands and musicians into the 1970s.

== Later life and career ==
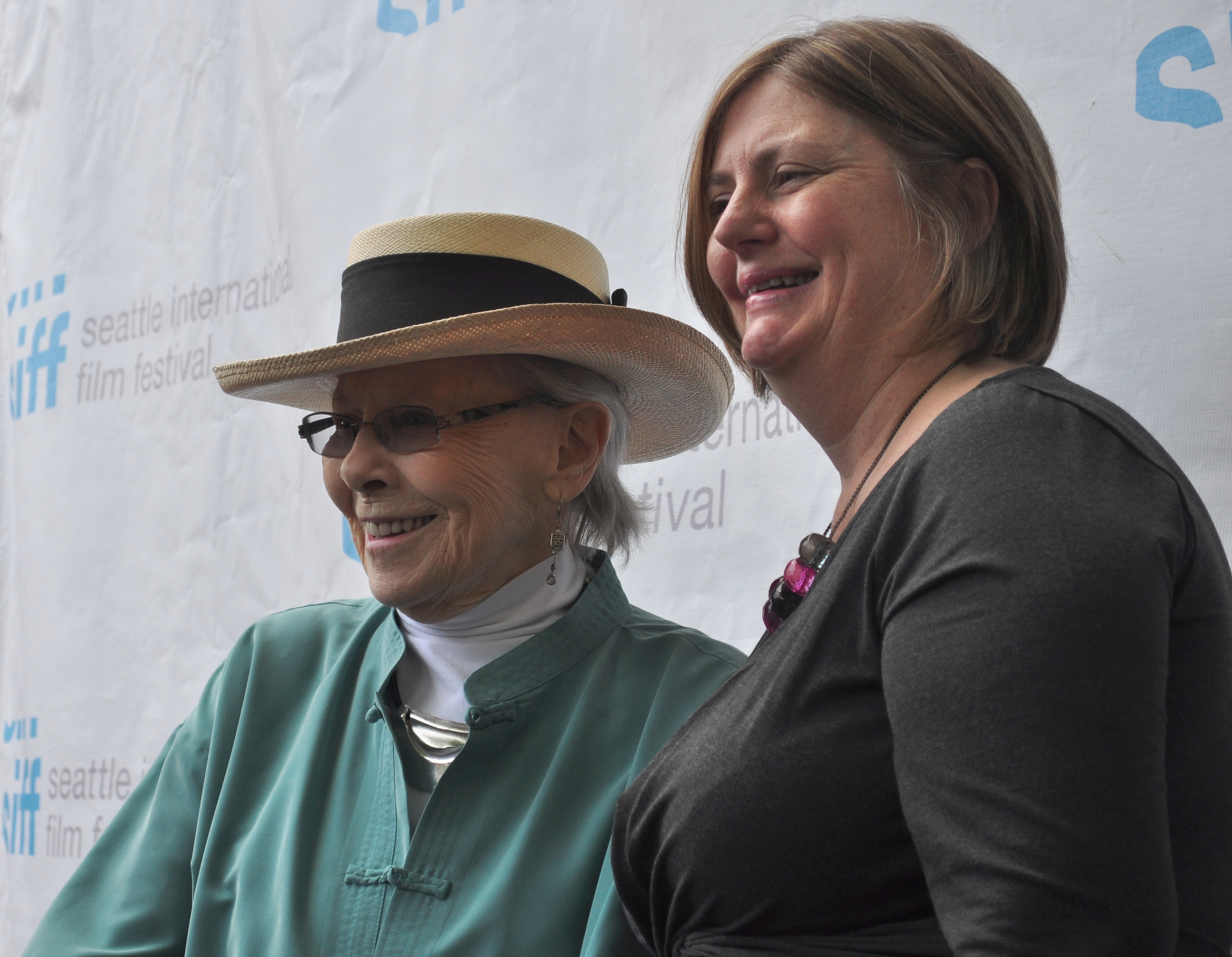
Dellaccio with film director Karen Whitehead at the world premiere of Her Aim Is True, Seattle International Film Festival, May 26, 2013.

In the 1980s, Jini and Carl Dellaccio moved to a retirement community in Sequim, Washington, and then to Arizona in 1991. Shortly after the move to Arizona Carl suffered a major stroke. Jini cared for him for thirteen years, until his death on September 7, 2004. "[Jini] said, ‘I'm so lucky I found you. And I want to tell you, you don't need to worry about me. I'm going to start doing pictures again,’” Jini said. “And when I said that to [Carl], I leaned back to get a better look at his expression. Lo and behold, a little smile on this one side of his face."

Beginning in the late 1980s, there have been several retrospective exhibitions of her work. Her Aim Is True, a documentary on her life and work by British filmmaker Karen Whitehead, had its world premiere at the Seattle International Film Festival on May 26, 2013.

Dellaccio later switched to a Hasselblad digital camera. She continued to honor her promise to Carl through her photography. Jini died at age 97, on July 3, 2014, in Seattle.
