= Paul Sand =

American actor and comedian (born 1932)

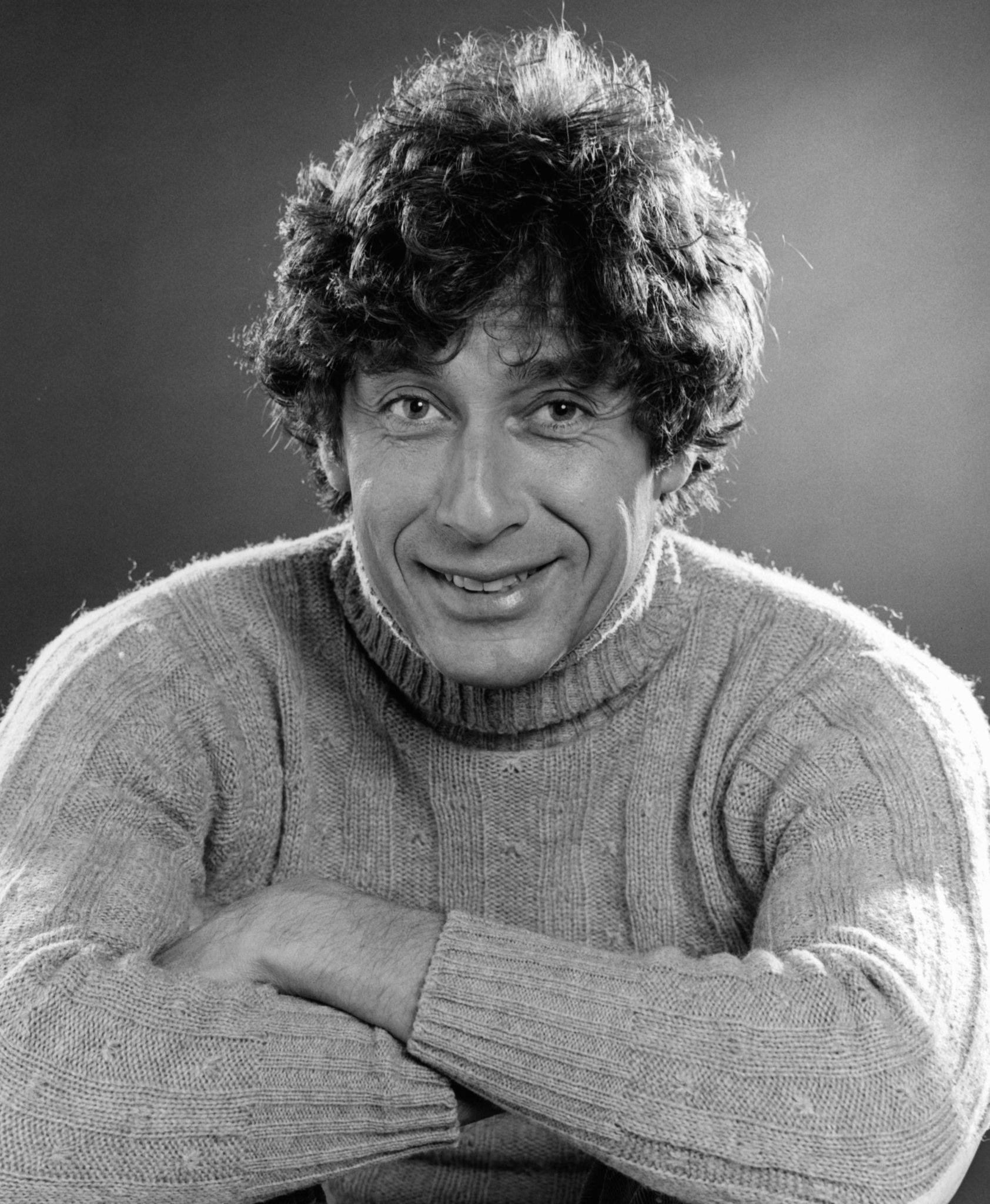
- Sand in Friends and Lovers (1974)
- Born: Pablo Sanchez; March 5, 1932 (age 94); Santa Monica, California, U.S.
- Occupations: Actor, comedian
- Years active: 1960–present
- Known for: Friends and Lovers

Paul Sand (born March 5, 1932) is an American actor and comedian.

== Background ==
Sand was born Pablo Sanchez in Santa Monica, California, in 1932, the son of Ernest Rivera Sanchez, an aerospace tool designer, and Sonia Borodiansky (aka Sonia Stone), a writer. He is of Russian Jewish and Mexican American ancestry.

== Career ==
At the age of 11, he started at Viola Spolin's Children's Theatre Company. From here, he attended Los Angeles State College before moving to Paris when he was 18. In Paris, Sand met Marcel Marceau, who was so impressed by his talents that he asked Sand to join his touring mime troupe.

In 1960, along with Alan Arkin and others, Sand was a cast member of The Second City improvisational comedy troupe in Chicago, which had just been established the previous year. In 1966, he co-starred with Linda Lavin and Jo Anne Worley in the off-Broadway production The Mad Show, inspired by Mad Magazine.

In 1971, Sand received a Tony Award for Best Performance by a Featured Actor in a Play for his work on Broadway in Paul Sills' Story Theatre and two Drama Desk Awards for Outstanding Performances on Broadway in Story Theatre and Metamorphosis. One of Sand's fellow cast members in Story Theatre was actress Valerie Harper, who, in 1970, had been signed to play Rhoda Morgenstern on the CBS-TV situation comedy The Mary Tyler Moore Show. During that show's first season, Sand was cast as Robert C. Brand, a tax auditor, who falls in love with Mary Richards (Moore) in the 11th episode "1040 or Fight". MTM Enterprises produced Friends and Lovers, in which Sand portrayed Robert Dreyfuss, a double bass player in the Boston Symphony Orchestra who falls in love easily but has little success with women. It premiered in the fall of 1974. Despite some favorable reviews and decent ratings, it was considered a disappointment and was cancelled in January 1975 after fifteen episodes had been filmed.

Sand also appeared in such motion pictures as The Hot Rock with Zero Mostel, The Second Coming of Suzanne alongside Sondra Locke, and The Main Event starring Barbra Streisand and Ryan O'Neal.

In the fall of 1986, Sand, joined the cast of the NBC sitcom Gimme a Break! starring Nell Carter, then approaching its sixth year on prime-time television.

== Filmography ==
=== Film ===
- A Great Big Thing (1968) - Morrie
- Viva Max! (1969) - Moreno
- The Hot Rock (1972) - Greenberg
- Every Little Crook and Nanny (1972) - Benny Napkins
- The Second Coming of Suzanne (1974) - Lee Simon
- The Great Bank Hoax (1978) - Richard Smedley
- The Main Event (1979) - David
- Wholly Moses! (1980) - Angel Of The Lord
- Can't Stop the Music (1980) - Steve Waits
- The Legend Of Sleepy Hollow (1980)
- Teen Wolf Too (1987) - Coach Finstock
- The Last Fling (1987) ABC Monday Night Movie - Jack
- Frozen Assets (1992) - McTaggert
- Layin' Low (1996) - Augie
- Camp Stories (1997) - Moishe
- Brittle Glory (1997)
- The Volunteers (1997) - Goldberg
- Zoo (1999) - Harold Ratsess
- Chuck & Buck (2000) - Barry
- Adam & Steve (2005) - Norm
- Queer Eye for the Homeless Guy (2005, Short) - Harry the Homeless Guy
- Sweet Land (2005) - Old Frandsen
- Queen of the Lot (2010) - Ernesto / Dependency Buster
- Simple Being (2014) - Teacher
- Loren & Rose (2022) - Phil

=== Television ===
- Shower of Stars (1955) - Himself - dancer (uncredited)
- That Was the Week That Was (1964)
- Mr. Broadway (1964) - Photographer
- Occasional Wife (1966) - Harvey
- Bewitched (1966) - Bill Whalen
- The Mary Tyler Moore Show (1970) - Robert C. Brand
- The Governor & J.J. (1970) - Lionel Newton
- The Carol Burnett Show (1972–1974) - Himself / Himself - Guest
- Paul Sand in Friends & Lovers (1974–1975) - Robert Dreyfuss also, producer
- Once Upon a Brothers Grimm (1977) - Wilhelm Grimm
- Wonder Woman (1978) - Del Franklin
- Fantasy Island (1978) - Duke Manducci
- Supertrain (1979)
- Taxi (1981) - Craig Eagen
- Laverne & Shirley (1981) - David
- Gloria (1982) - Boffo the Clown
- Alice (1983) - Alan
- The Love Boat (1983) - Wally Denton
- St. Elsewhere (1983–1984) - Dr. Michael Ridley
- Domestic Life (1984) - Dr. Carl Pate
- Cagney & Lacey (1985) - Robert Wolitzer
- Murder, She Wrote (1985) - Horace Lynchfield
- Trapper John, M.D. (1985) - Philip Devonshire
- Who's the Boss? (1985–1987) - Packard / Wally
- It's a Living (1986) - Brian Phipps
- Magnum, P.I. (1986) - Denny Prine
- Gimme a Break! (1986–1987) - Marty
- The Twilight Zone (1987) - Bluestone (segment "Time and Teresa Golowitz")
- thirtysomething (1987) - Andy Aronson / Jim / Rex
- Empty Nest (1989-1991) - Avery / Poko
- Quantum Leap (1989) - Charlie
- True Colors (1990–1991) - Leonard Davis
- Baby Talk (1991) - Paul
- Night Court (1991) - Prof. Jarvis Crowley
- Eerie, Indiana (1992) - Charles Furnell / Simon Holmes
- Danger Theatre (1993) - Jimmy Jakes (segment "Move My Lips")
- L.A. Law (1994) - Headmaster Ted Waldron
- The X Files (1994) - Gird Thomas
- Dr Quinn, femme médecin(1995)- Le grand-père du bébé sauvé (Famille Bishop)
- The Secret World of Alex Mack (1997) - Charles 'Chappy' Furnell
- Sabrina the Teenage Witch (1997) - Dr. Rafkin
- Dharma & Greg (1998) - Salazar
- Maggie Winters (1998) - Brad
- Sliders (1999) - Dr. Malcolm White ("Map of the Mind" episode 5/12)
- E! True Hollywood Story (2001, documentary) - Himself
- Curb Your Enthusiasm (2002) - Guy Bernier
- Joan of Arcadia (2003–2005) - Rabbi Polonski
- Palm Royale (2024) - Axel Rosenhips
