= The Second Coming of Suzanne =

- Directed by: Michael Barry
- Written by: Michael Barry
- Produced by: Ralph Buris
- Starring: Sondra Locke; Paul Sand; Jared Martin; Gene Barry; Richard Dreyfuss
- Cinematography: Isidore Mankofsky
- Edited by: Frank Mazzola
- Music by: Don Caverhill
- Production company: Barry Films
- Distributed by: George Ritter Films
- Release date: August 14, 1974
- Running time: 90 minutes
- Country: United States
- Language: English
- Budget: $2.4 million

The Second Coming of Suzanne is a 1974 American drama film directed by Michael Barry. It stars Jared Martin as an obsessed San Francisco indie film maker who hires a beautiful woman called Suzanne (played by Sondra Locke) to star as a female Christ in his next film. Paul Sand co-stars as Suzanne's artist boyfriend. Richard Dreyfuss appears as a member of the crew who becomes concerned at the increasingly weird antics of the rest of the ensemble, which culminate in the crucifixion of Suzanne on a local hill. The film was inspired by the lyrics of Leonard Cohen's song "Suzanne", as heard on the soundtrack. The director's father Gene Barry is also featured, as a TV presenter, in a somewhat opaque sub-plot. The film music was recorded by Touch.

Shot in 1972 but shelved for two years, The Second Coming of Suzanne garnered mixed reviews from critics and minimal box office revenues. It did gain some notoriety due to a racy-for-its-time sex scene between Locke and Sand.

== Cast ==
- Sondra Locke as Suzanne
- Paul Sand as Lee Simon
- Jared Martin as Logan
- Richard Dreyfuss as Clavius
- Gene Barry as Jackson Sinclair
- Gregory Enton as Heath
- Penelope Spheeris as Margo
- Rudy Lavalle as Cameraman
- David Moody as Soundman
- Robert Feero as S.F.

== Production ==
Principal photography was originally set to start September 1, 1971, but was delayed until the following summer. Gene Barry raised the financing from private sources. Filming finally began July 31, 1972 in San Francisco and surrounding areas, and lasted "six or eight weeks". Locations include Sam's Anchor Café, Angel Island and the Lyford House in Tiburon, the Bay Bridge toll plaza, Golden Gate Park and downtown Berkeley.

== Reception ==
The Second Coming of Suzanne won three medals for best first feature, film editing and cinematography at the Atlanta Film Festival. Joe Pollack of the St. Louis Post-Dispatch gave the movie two out of five stars, calling it "visually fascinating, but also strangely disconnected and extremely self-indulgent." Jacoba Atlas, writing for the Los Angeles Free Press, called it "banal in the extreme," and the San Francisco Examiner's Michele Lomax echoed that the movie is "without soul." Syndicated critic Rex Reed, however, hailed it as "an arresting, poetic puzzle of a film that stimulates and hypnotizes by utilizing every aspect of the cinematic medium...courageous, free-swinging filmmaking, full of surprises and freshness...it's exciting." John H. Dorr of The Hollywood Reporter praised the movie's unusual atmosphere, saying it "unfolds from image to magic image with an innovative beauty" and "lingers long in the mind." New York Daily News reviewer Kathleen Carroll said it is "an artistic triumph" and "a dazzling surrealistic trip." A mixed review from The Oregonian's Ted Mahar stated that the film is "technically first class but its content [is] like something cooked up by the freshman class."

== See also ==
- List of American films of 1974
- List of avant-garde films of the 1970s
