= Richard E. Council =

American actor

Richard E. Council (born October 1, 1947, in Tampa, Florida), sometimes credited as Richard Council, is an American film, television and stage actor.

== Early life ==
Council grew up on his family farm in Florida.

== Career ==
Early theatre credits include a small part opposite John Wood in Sherlock Holmes in 1974, as well as Harold Pinter's The Caretaker at Long Wharf Theatre. In 1979, he joined the company of Lexington Conservatory Theatre with the world premiere of Grinder's Stand by Oakley Hall III, followed by a starring role in Of Mice and Men a year later, a role that resonated with him. "From my unique vantage as the son of a farmer, doing this play is my golden opportunity to draw on those memories and experiences," he said. Later, as the company moved to Albany and became Capital Repertory Theatre, he starred in Hall's adaptation of Frankenstein with an "towering performance."

His Broadway credits include Conversations with My Father and I'm Not Rappaport, both plays by Herb Gardner; The Royal Family, The Merchant of Venice and The Philadelphia Story, all plays directed by Ellis Rabb. At the Lincoln Center Theater he performed opposite Stockard Channing in The Little Foxes directed by Jack O'Brien. Off-Broadway he appeared in Nine Armenians by Leslie Ayvazian at the Manhattan Theatre Club, Isn't It Romantic by Wendy Wasserstein at the Lucille Lortel Theatre and Isadora Duncan Sleeps with The Russian Navy by Jeff Wanshel at the American Place Theatre. He played Michael Blake on CBS Television's Love of Life from 1976 to 1978. Notable feature film appearances include Die Hard with a Vengeance, Canadian Bacon, Witness to the Mob, I'm Not Rappaport, and Thirteen Conversations About One Thing.

== Filmography ==
=== Film ===
Year	Title	Role	Notes
1985	Streetwalkin'	Sadistic John	
1986	The Manhattan Project	Government Aide	
1988	The River Pirates	Mr. Morris	
1990	Just Like in the Movies	Robert	
1993	Carlito's Way	Diamond Room Man	
1994	Quiz Show	Reporter #1	Uncredited
1995	Die Hard with a Vengeance	Otto	
1995	Canadian Bacon	Russian President	
1995	Killer: A Journal of Murder	Cop	
1996	Camp Stories	Older Paul	
1996	The First Wives Club	Security Guard	Uncredited
1996	I'm Not Rappaport	Butcher	
1997	A Further Gesture	FBI Agent No. 1	
1998	Karma Local	Henchman	
2000	Unbreakable	Noel	
2001	Thirteen Conversations About One Thing	Del Strickland	
2004	The Loss of Nameless Things	The Creature / Lenny	
2006	Diggers	Guy in Truck	Uncredited
2009	When the Evening Comes	Rudy	
2011	Caris' Peace	—N/a	

=== Television ===
Year	Title	Role	Notes
1981	As the World Turns	Ari Triandos	Episode dated 14 May 1981
1987	Kate & Allie	Jerry	Episode: "Kate and the Cab Driver"
1989	Kojak: Fatal Flaw	Doorman	Television film
1993–2000	Law & Order	Various roles	3 episodes
1994	The Cosby Mysteries	Joe Danelli	Episode: "Home, Street Home"
1996	Cosby	Customer	Episode: "The Best Little Antique Shop in Astoria"
1998	New York Undercover	Kharkov	Episode: "Pipeline"
1998	Witness to the Mob	Louie Di Bono	Television film
2001	Third Watch	Bartender	Episode: "True Love"
2001	Deadline	Detective Haake	Episode: "Just Lie Back"
2001	Ed	Matthew Crain	Episode: "Goodbye Sadie"
2004	Law & Order: Criminal Intent	Detective Mellon	Episode: "Consumed"
2010	You Don't Know Jack	Judge David Breck	Television film
2015	Louie	Club Owner	Episode: "The Road: Part 2"
