= Golden Crest Records =

Former American record label

- Industry: Music Label
- Founded: 1956; 70 years ago
- Founder: Clark Galehouse
- Defunct: 1983
- Headquarters: United States
- Parent: Shelley Products

Golden Crest Records was an American music label. In its original incarnation it produced records from 1956 until 1983 and was headed by Clark Galehouse. It was a subsidiary of Shelley Products in Huntington Station. The label released The Fabulous Wailers instrumental hit "Tall Cool One". Ace Records released a Best of Golden Crest album. The label's collection is in the Library of Congress.

== Discography ==
- James F. Burke albums
  - The All-Star Concert Band (Golden Crest Records, 1960)
  - The Burke/Phillips All-Star Concert Band (Golden Crest Records, 1961)
- John Cacavas A Touch of Plush (John Cacavas conducting the Queen's Hall Light Orchestra)
- Mark Thomas albums
  - Images (with Christine Croshaw) (Golden Crest Records, 1982)
  - Contrasts (with Christine Croshaw) (Golden Crest Records, 1983)
- Paul Brodie albums
- Wind Quintet (Schoenberg) album
- Gigi
  - A Touch of Plush - John Cacavas conducting the Queen's Hall Light Orchestra
- Fisher Tull album
- Leonard Falcone album
- Jack Winerock album
- William Bell album
- Scott Joplin album
- John Garvey album
- Coenraad Bloemendal album
- Malcolm Bilson album
- The Chessmen album
- Billy Mure
- The Montells
