= Camp Stories =

- Film poster
- Directed by: Herbert Beigel
- Written by: Herbert Beigel
- Produced by: Scott Macaulay
- Starring: Paul Sand; Jerry Stiller; Zachary Taylor; Elliott Gould
- Cinematography: Paul Gibson
- Edited by: Meg Reticker
- Music by: Evan Beigel; Roy Nathanson
- Production company: Forensic Films
- Distributed by: Artistic License Films
- Release dates: March 21, 1996 (New York City); April 18, 1997 (U.S.)
- Running time: 99 minutes
- Country: United States

Camp Stories is a 1996 independent comedy film written and directed by Herbert Beige. The film stars Paul Sand, Elliott Gould, Jerry Stiller, Zachary Taylor, and Jason Biggs. It takes a comic look at a Jewish summer camp in the 1950s. The film premiered in March 1996 and later received a limited theatrical release in April 18, 1997 in the United States.

== Plot ==
In the summer of 1958, 15-year-old David Katz is constantly defying authority figures at Camp Ararat, an Orthodox Jewish summer camp in the Poconos that he is enrolled in. A movie buff, David would rather spend his time in movie theaters and tries to sneak away to a cinema. He especially riles the paranoid camp counsellor Chaim, who believes David is having an affair with his wife. The adolescent antics continue with the boys arranging midnight rendezvous at the nearby girls' camp. Among the camp staff, there is also a power struggle over who will succeed the camp’s founder, Schlomo, a conservative man who declares rock and roll music obscene. The struggle comes down to Chaim and Moishe, the latter who sees David as a "good kid".

== Cast ==
- Zachary Taylor as David Katz
  - Elliott Gould as older David
- Jerry Stiller as Schlomo
- Ben Shenkman as Yehudah
- Kris Park as Paul
  - Richard Council as older Paul
- Paul Sand as Moishe
- Ted Marcoux as Chaim
- Talia Balsam as Mary
- Scott Cohen as Schnair
- Jason Biggs as Abby
- Susan Vanech as Sally
- Bret Barsky as Malcolm
- Rick Hochman as Rick Stevens
- Andrew Barlow as Milty
- Susan Bruce as Sarah
- Erin Liz Peck as Rachel

== Reception ==
Stephen Holden of The New York Times praised the film, asserting that it is "more honest than most 1950s nostalgia films in its portrayal of teen-age life." Holden added "the political jockeying among staff members to succeed the camp's ultraconservative founder, Schlomo (Jerry Stiller), mirrors the cultural conflicts just beginning to surface in America (and in Judaism), symbolized by the bubbling up of rock-and-roll." Holden also concluded that this "tender" film is "beautifully acted".

Other reviews found the film cliché-ridden. Kevin Thomas of the Los Angeles Times wrote "Beigel’s clear commitment to his people and their stories and some good actors--Taylor, especially--keep us involved, even though the film tends to be repetitious", and said the film surprisingly lacks scenes of "religious observance and instruction".
