= Friends and Lovers (TV series) =

1974 American TV series

- Title card with text "Friends & Lovers." A card with the text "Paul Sand in" immediately preceded it in the opening credits.
- Genre: Sitcom
- Created by: James L. Brooks; Mary Tyler Moore; Allan Burns
- Directed by: James Burrows
- Starring: Paul Sand; Michael Pataki; Penny Marshall; Dick Wesson; Steve Landesberg; Craig Richard Nelson; Jack Gilford; Jan Miner
- Country of origin: United States
- Original language: English
- No. of seasons: 1
- No. of episodes: 15

Production
- Executive producers: James L. Brooks; Allan Burns; Mary Tyler Moore; James Burrows
- Producer: Paul Sand
- Running time: 30 minutes
- Production company: MTM Enterprises

Original release
- Network: CBS
- Release: September 14, 1974 – January 4, 1975

Friends and Lovers (also known as Paul Sand in Friends and Lovers) is an American sitcom starring Paul Sand, which centers on a musician in Boston, Massachusetts, and his relationships. It was Sand's only starring role in a television series. The show aired from September 14, 1974, to January 4, 1975.

== Cast ==
- Paul Sand as Robert Dreyfuss
- Michael Pataki as Charlie Dreyfuss
- Penny Marshall as Janice Dreyfuss
- Dick Wesson as Jack Riordan
- Steve Landesberg as Fred Meyerbach
- Craig Richard Nelson as Mason Woodruff
- Jack Gilford as Ben Dreyfuss
- Jan Miner as Marge Dreyfuss

== Synopsis ==
Robert Dreyfuss is a young bachelor and double-bass player who returns to Boston after living in Denver, Colorado, for three years and wins a job playing with the Boston Symphony Orchestra. He is a romantic who falls in love easily with the women he meets but has little luck with them because he is shy, passive, dour-faced, and tends to say the wrong things at the wrong time. In sharp contrast, his older brother Charlie is aggressive, loud, physically fit, and athletic. Charlie is protective of Robert, while Charlie's affection-starved wife Janice constantly mocks Robert for his romantic failures.

Robert often gets caught in the middle of the arguments to which Charlie and Janice are prone. Charlie and Janice have a three-year-old son named Brendan, who is mentioned in the first episode, but Brendan never appears in the show and is never discussed in any other episode. Ben and Marge are Robert and Charlie's parents. In the orchestra, Robert makes friends with an Austrian violinist, Fred Meyerbach, who has a strained relationship with his father. They must deal with the young, sarcastic, and overweight conductor, Mason Woodruff, and the antagonistic orchestra manager, Jack Riordan.

== Production ==
Paul Sand was a rising star – he had won a Tony Award on Broadway and received good reviews for his appearances on The Carol Burnett Show and The Mary Tyler Moore Show – when MTM Enterprises decided to give him his situation comedy in 1974. In order to provide the show with the maximum possible exposure to new viewers, CBS aired Friends and Lovers on Saturday at 8:30 p.m. between two blockbuster hit situation comedies, All in the Family at 8:00 p.m. and The Mary Tyler Moore Show at 9:00 p.m. – arguably the best time slot for a new series in the autumn of 1974. The show also received much publicity, touted as the "sleeper" hit of the fall 1974 season.

James L. Brooks and Allan Burns created and were the executive producers of the show. Writers included Linda Bloodworth-Thomason, Gordon Farr, Lowell Ganz, Steve Gordon, Andrew Johnson, Monica Mcgowan Johnson, Arnold Kane, Allan Leicht, Coleman Mitchell, Phil Mishkin, Geoffrey Neigher, Mary Kay Place, Steve Pritzker, and Bud Wiser. Episode directors were Peter Bonerz, Bob Claver, Tim Kiley, Robert Moore, Alan Rafkin, and Jay Sandrich.

The show was filmed in color before a studio audience.

== Episodes ==
No.	Title	Original release date
1	"Getting to First Bass"	September 14, 1974
Robert returns to Boston from Denver, auditions for the orchestra, lands a job with it, meets Fred, reconnects with his ex-girlfriend, and falls for an untalented new student. Henry Winkler guest-stars as an egotistical cellist; Bo Hopkins and Lynne Lipton also guest-star.
2	"The Big Fight"	September 21, 1974
Robert shushes a muscled loudmouth and gets egged into a fight with him. Max Gail guest-stars.
3	"Love Thy Neighbor"	September 28, 1974
Robert wants romance with a neighbor who broke up with her husband.
4	"Fiddler in the House"	October 5, 1974
Robert's life is disrupted when Fred's father, a violin virtuoso who is affable but feels superior to those around him, comes to visit. Teri Garr and Leon Askin guest-star.
5	"The Cinderella Story"	October 12, 1974
Robert falls for a ballerina dancing the part of Cinderella. Andrea Marcovicci guest-stars.
6	"Ben and Marge Are Back"	October 19, 1974
Robert and Charlie's parents Ben and Marge return from Arizona and reveal that they have lost all of their money and will be staying in Boston.
7	"Moran's the Man"	October 26, 1974
A friend invites Robert to date the same woman he has been dating, creating a romantic triangle. Robert Klein, Mariette Hartley, and Pamela Bellwood guest-star.
8	"A Date with Robert"	November 2, 1974
Attempting to find a classy date to take to an important dinner, Robert can do no better than a woman who works as a part-time bus driver. Beverly Sanders and Dena Dietrich guest-star.
9	"Dreyfuss and Dreyfuss, Associates"	9 November 1974
Charlie designs a gas station and enters an architectural competition. Gordon Jump guest stars.
10	"Smart Move"	16 November 1974
Robert feels that everyone around him is pressuring him to get married and buy a house. Sharon Spelman guest-stars.
11	"Maid in the Snow"	23 November 1974
Janice plans a romantic Thanksgiving holiday with Charlie at a ski resort, but Charlie ruins it by inviting Robert, Fred, and Fred's girlfriend Trudy – then Robert comes down with a cold and hurts his back and Janice must care for him in the cabin while the others are out skiing. Karen Morrow guest-stars.
12	"All's Well That Ends"	30 November 1974
Robert plays coach in a romance between a baseball player and a stewardess.
13	"Just the Ticket"	7 December 1974
Robert gets his father Ben a job at the orchestra's ticket office.
14	"The Groupie"	14 December 1974
A determined 14-year-old flutist announces to Robert that she is his groupie and pursues him both at work and at home. Susan Neher and Robin Strasser guest-star.
15	"From Russia with Lust"	4 January 1975
A girl-crazy Soviet pianist moves in with Robert.

== Cancellation ==
Some critics expressed disappointment in Friends and Lovers – the Boston Herald American's Anthony La Camera called it "a downright disappointment", and the Boston Globe's Percy Shain said it was "mundane and average, with few laughs" – but others gave it more favorable reviews. The premiere episode, which aired on September 14, 1974, was the 14th-most-watched show of the week, and during its run, the show had good ratings – for example, a 36 share in early October 1974 – and was the 25th most-viewed television show of the season. However, its ratings paled in comparison to those of the shows before and after it; it lost viewers from All in the Family, which had a 51 share in early October 1974, and network executives believed that it did not provide a good lead-in audience for The Mary Tyler Moore Show, viewership of which fell from previous seasons to a 39 share by early October 1974. Especially given the high hopes the network had had for the show, it was considered a ratings disappointment for its highly advantageous time slot and, in fact, one of the bigger disappointments of the fall 1974 season.

CBS cancelled the show after only 15 episodes, the last of which was broadcast on January 4, 1975. Along with The Texas Wheelers (which ABC yanked from its schedule after just four episodes), Friends and Lovers was one of the first two MTM Enterprises shows ever to be cancelled.

In January 1975, two weeks after it last aired, Friends and Lovers was replaced in its time slot by a new show, The Jeffersons. A better fit for CBS's Saturday evening line-up, with an average Nielsen rating of 27.6 in its first season compared to the 20.7 average for Friends and Lovers, The Jeffersons was a major hit which aired in first-run production for the next ten years.
