= Elyse Weinberg =

Canadian-American singer-songwriter (1945–2020)

- Also known as: Cori Bishop; Elyse
- Born: October 25, 1945; Chatham, Ontario, Canada
- Died: February 20, 2020 (aged 74); Ashland, Oregon, U.S.
- Occupation: Singer-songwriter
- Instrument(s): Vocals, guitar
- Years active: 1963–1971, 2000s–2020
- Labels: Tetragrammaton, Orange Twin

Elyse J. Weinberg (October 25, 1945 – February 20, 2020) was a Canadian-American singer-songwriter. In later life she used the name Cori Bishop.

== Biography ==
Weinberg was born in Chatham, Ontario, Canada. She and her family moved to Montreal when she was 12, and she started playing guitar. She began playing in folk clubs, and studied at McGill University, before dropping out in 1963 to pursue a music career in Toronto, where she played regularly in clubs and at the Mariposa Folk Festival. She later commented: "There was quite a scene – Neil Young, Joni Mitchell, Ian and Sylvia, Gordon Lightfoot. We all hung out and played together." After travelling to Europe and Israel, she returned to Toronto and formed a folk-rock band, O.D. Bodkins & Company, with Ken Koblun (formerly a bandmate of Young in the Squires) and others.

She moved briefly to New York, and then to Los Angeles to meet up with her friend Neil Young, who had just formed Buffalo Springfield. She stayed with Cass Elliot, who introduced her to her manager, Roy Silver. After hearing Weinberg's songs, Silver signed her to the Tetragrammaton label, co-owned by Silver with Bill Cosby and others. Weinberg released her first album, Elyse, in 1969. With Young on guitar, a studio band called Touch, and produced by Don Gallucci, the album was described as a "mixture of death-fixated medieval folk, imaginative pop arrangements and very 60's psychedelic rock". According to some sources it reached the Billboard album chart, but this is not confirmed by Joel Whitburn's books which do not mention it. Weinberg was also featured in a Newsweek article which compared her with Joni Mitchell and Laura Nyro. Writer Harlan Ellison described her as a "mythical creature with blue-eyed soul". She appeared on The Tonight Show singing Bert Jansch's "'Deed I Do", which was released as a single. Another of her songs, "Band of Thieves", was sung by Cher in the movie Chastity; wrongly credited as a Sonny Bono composition and called "Chastity's Theme", it was later credited to Weinberg.

Weinberg recorded a second album, Greasepaint Smile, produced by David Briggs and featuring both Young and Nils Lofgren. However, the record label went bankrupt before the record could be released. Another album was recorded at London's Trident Studios (an acetate exists). She continued to perform occasionally at the Troubadour in Los Angeles, and was then signed to David Geffen's Asylum Records, for whom she made further unreleased recordings for another album, Wildfire. However, her relationship with manager Roy Silver soured, and her proposed album was shelved.

She gave up her music career, later saying: "I kept writing songs, but as I entered onto a spiritual path, I just drifted away from that lifestyle, which was fortunate." Developing an interest in numerology, she changed her name to Cori Bishop, and continued to live in Los Angeles before moving to Santa Fe, New Mexico in the early 1990s, and then to Ashland, Oregon, where she worked in insurance.

In 2000, she was contacted by musician Andrew Rieger of the band Elf Power, who had picked up a copy of her LP. She agreed that it be reissued, with a bonus track featuring Neil Young. As a result of the new attention, she began performing again with a band, as Baby Cori and the Buds. In 2009, as Elyse, she released a new album, In My Own Sweet Time. Her second album, Greasepaint Smile, was also released on CD. Her songs were covered by Vetiver, Dinosaur Jr., and Courtney Barnett.

Elyse Weinberg died in 2020, aged 74, from lung cancer.
