= Reggaematic Funk =

Single by Monyaka

from the album Reggaenomics
- Released: 1983
- Genre: Electronic, Hip Hop, Reggae
- Length: 8:01 (vocal mix); 5:09 (radio edit)
- Songwriter(s): Errol Moore
- Producer(s): Errol Moore

Reggaematic Funk is a 1983 single by Monyaka. It made #83 on the UK Singles Chart.
