= Touch (1960s band) =

American progressive rock band

Touch was a 1960s American progressive rock band who recorded one album, 1968's eponymous Touch. They consisted of John Bordonaro (drums, percussion, vocals), Don Gallucci (keyboards, vocals), Bruce Hauser (bass, vocals), Jeff Hawks (vocals), and Joey Newman AKA Vern Kjellberg (guitar, vocals).

Vocal duties were shared across the group: Newman sang lead on "Seventy Five" (often misattributed to Hawks), Hauser sang lead on "Friendly Birds" and "Alesha and Others," Bordonaro sang the opening verse of "The Spiritual Death of Howard Greer," and "Miss Teach" featured lead vocals from Gallucci, Hauser, and Bordonaro across its three verses.

== History ==
After leaving The Kingsmen, Gallucci founded Don and the Goodtimes with drummer Bob Holden. An early version of the band included Jack Ely. They had a No. 56 pop hit in the US with "I Could Be So Good to You," produced and arranged by the legendary Jack Nitzsche. By this time earlier Goodtimes members had been replaced by vocalist Jeff Hawks, guitarist Joey Newman and bassist/vocalist Ron "Buzz" Overman.

By the end of 1967, following the release of Sgt. Pepper's Lonely Hearts Club Band, the Goodtimes were beginning to feel like they were "just rearranging the deck chairs on the Titanic" and felt the need to move on. Accordingly Gallucci and Hawks wrote what the sleevenotes to the Eclectic Discs CD reissue of the album calls the "lysergic soaked" epic "Seventy Five". In a 2026 interview, Gallucci described the origin of "Seventy Five": late one night in 1967 at Columbia's recording studio, after the Goodtimes' hit "I Could Be So Good to You" stalled in the wake of Sgt. Pepper, he wrote the opening section. He and guitarist Joey Newman named it "Seventy Five" because, as Gallucci recalled, "This doesn't sound like anything people do today. It sounds like something from another time." The feedback the band received was that they were "about ten years ahead of their time." Gallucci, Hawks, and Newman teamed up with Hauser and Bordonaro, and they set themselves up in a Moorish-style castle in the Hollywood Hills where they set to work on writing the songs for the album.

After signing with Coliseum Records, but before recording Touch, the group recorded the music tracks for the Elyse Weinberg LP using the name "The Band of Thieves", after her song of the same name. Gene Shiveley engineered the sessions at Sunset Sound Recorders.

The Touch recordings took place at Sunset Sound with Gene Shiveley as engineer. In a 2026 interview, Gallucci clarified the circumstances of the famous studio visits: Hendrix heard the buzz about the band, arrived unannounced, and paid the studio for time so he could sit in the booth and listen to the unfinished tracks. Jagger arrived carrying the 8-track of Beggars Banquet, liked what he heard from Shiveley, and the Touch sessions stopped for a week while Shiveley mixed the Rolling Stones album at Sunset Sound. Grace Slick also visited within two to three weeks of the others.

The band also released a single, "Miss Teach"/"We Feel Fine", from the album, but folded soon after for personal reasons.

In an article for Record Collector, Kris Needs wrote that Touch has gone on to be "regarded as a cornerstone" of American progressive rock, and noted its status as a valuable collector's item until its 2004 reissue on the label Eclectic. He added of the record:

Creating psychedelic sounds using normal instruments, tone generator and studio effects, Touch is widescreen, melodic, texturally rich and suitably surreal on titles such as 'The Spiritual Death of Howard Greer', along with the spectacular 'Seventy Five'. The album has since been acknowledged as a major influence on Yes and post-Gabriel Genesis, along with arena proggers Kansas. Though big with UK DJs ... Touch proved too exotic for the US as it drifted into hard rock, found it hard to recreate the album live, and split. Gallucci elaborated on the band's inability to tour in a 2026 interview: synthesizers did not yet exist, he used a pump organ that required physical pumping to achieve certain tones, guitar effects pedals were brand new technology, and too many studio effects could not be replicated with available live sound equipment. "Now it's a piece of cake," Gallucci said. "Then it was impossible." "

== Legacy and rediscovery ==
Gallucci believed for decades that the album was a commercial failure that few people heard. He only learned of Kansas guitarist Kerry Livgren's endorsement when the album was reissued on Renaissance Records in the 1990s. Livgren's liner note contribution described pulling over on a highway at 2 AM while driving through the Midwest when he first heard "Seventy Five" on the radio, and buying two copies the next day—"one to absorb and one for posterity."

Gallucci discovered the album's cult following years later through YouTube comments, where listeners described how the album had changed their lives or inspired them creatively. He characterized the response as people finding something "encouraging—to reach out, to spread your wings."

Hip-hop producer J Dilla sampled "Seventy Five" on the track "Lazer Gunne Funke."

== Discography ==
=== Album ===
Touch

Original LP, 1968:

1. "We Feel Fine" 4:41
2. "Friendly Birds" 4:53
3. "Miss Teach" 3:29
4. "The Spiritual Death of Howard Greer" 8:52
5. "Down at Circe's Place" 4:00
6. "Alesha and Others" 3:05
7. "Seventy Five" 11:12
- Total time: 40:12

CD release in 2004, Eclectic Disks ECLCD 1005. Tracks 8-12 are bonus tracks:

1. "We Feel Fine" 4:39
2. "Friendly Birds" 4:51
3. "Miss Teach" 3:29
4. "The Spiritual Death of Howard Greer" 8:52
5. "Down at Circe's Place" 3:59
6. "Alesha and Others" 3:04
7. "Seventy Five" 11:47
8. "We Finally Met Today" (unreleased single 1968) 3:41
9. "Alesha and Others" (live studio demo 1968) 3:14
10. "Blue Feeling" 11:45
11. "The Spiritual Death of Howard Greer" (live studio demo 1968) 8:07
12. "The Second Coming of Suzanne" (film music 1973) 12:19
- Total time: 79:22

=== Singles ===
- "Miss Teach" / "We Feel Fine" (Coliseum 45-2712, 1968)
- "We Feel Fine" / "Down at Circe's Place" + "We Finally Met Today" (Fruits de Mer Records Crustacean 88, UK reissue, 2018)
