= Pierre Ouellette =

American novelist

- Born: 1945 (age 80–81); Seattle, Washington, U.S.
- Occupations: Advertising and public relations, novelist
- Writing career
- Genre: science fiction
- Notable work: The Deus Machine
- Literary movement: hard SF
- Musical career
- Instruments: guitar, vocals
- Years active: 1963–1980s
- Formerly of: Paul Revere & the Raiders, Don and the Goodtimes

Pierre Ouellette (born 1945) is an American science fiction author and former musician.

== Career ==
=== Music ===
When Ouellette was a teenager and living in Portland, Oregon, he was a guitarist in many local bands. He was briefly a member of Paul Revere & the Raiders in 1963, and in 1964, was a founding member of Don and the Goodtimes, performing with them until late 1965, when he was replaced by Jim Valley; while in The Goodtimes, Ouellette played on the bands first five singles. In 1979, he was a founding member of The Sludge Bros.

=== Writing ===
He wrote the science fiction thrillers The Deus Machine (Villard Books, 1994) and The Third Pandemic (Pocket Books, 1996). Writing under the name of Pierre Davis, his third novel A Breed Apart was published in 2009 by Bantam-Dell. A fourth book, entitled Origin Unknown was published in July 2011. His fifth book, titled The Forever Man, was published in January 2014 by Alibi Books, a Random House imprint. His latest novel, Bakersfield, a crime story set in mid-1950s California, was due out in September 2018 from Jorvik Press. In 2000, Ouellette sold the advertising and PR agency he co-founded.

== Personal life ==
Ouellette lives in Portland, Oregon.
