= Don Gallucci =

American musician and producer (born 1948)

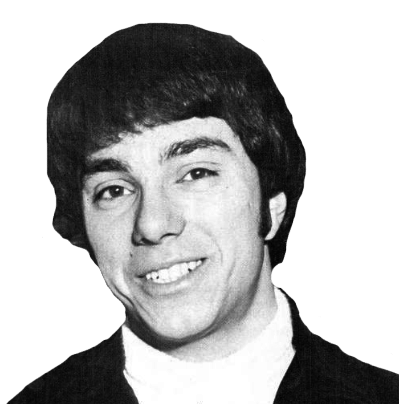
- Don Gallucci in 1967

Background information
- Also known as: Don Burton Caverhill
- Born: Donald Frank Gallucci; October 31, 1947 (age 78); Portland, Oregon, US
- Genres: Rock, psychedelic
- Occupations: Musician, producer
- Instrument: Keyboards
- Years active: 1962–1977, 2005–present
- Formerly of: The Royal Notes, The Kingsmen, Don and the Goodtimes, Touch

Don Burton Caverhill (born October 31, 1947 as Donald Frank Gallucci) is an American musician and producer. He was the keyboard player for the Kingsmen, performing the signature opening riff on "Louie Louie". After stints with Don and the Goodtimes and Touch, he produced the Stooges' Fun House in 1970. He then changed his surname to Caverhill and continued performing, composing, and producing on multiple albums and film soundtracks before retiring from music in 1977 to work in real estate.

== Career ==
=== The Kingsmen ===
1963 Kingsmen "Louie Louie" lineup. Gallucci at far left.

Gallucci was the keyboard player in the Royal Notes and a freshman in high school when he was asked to join the Kingsmen. At 15, he played the famous electric piano intro on "Louie Louie", which became a staple in garage rock, and also co-composed (with Jack Ely) the single's B side, "Haunted Castle". When "Louie Louie" became a national hit, Gallucci was forced out of the band because he was too young to tour.

=== Don and the Goodtimes ===
After leaving the Kingsmen, Gallucci formed his own band, Don and the Goodtimes, in 1964. Originally from Portland, Oregon, they moved to Los Angeles in 1967 and released several singles and albums, including a No. 56 pop hit with "I Could Be So Good to You," produced and arranged by Jack Nitzsche. They also performed on many popular television shows, including The Lloyd Thaxton Show, Hollywood a Go Go, and weekly performances on Where the Action Is.

=== Touch ===
In 1968, Gallucci disbanded the Goodtimes and with some of the members formed Touch, a psych-pop group, that "may have possibly been the first American progressive rock band".

The recording sessions for Touch, their only album, were attended by Jimi Hendrix, Mick Jagger, Grace Slick, and other local rock luminaries. The album performed poorly in the U.S., partly due to lack of a supporting tour (and the difficulty of producing it's "innovative, seminal" sounds live), but was played heavily by U.K. DJs in London underground clubs and influenced local musicians.

The group was short-lived, releasing one album and one single, but is regarded today as a cornerstone of early prog rock.

=== Producing/composing ===
In early 1970, Gallucci was hired by Elektra Records as a staff producer. In May 1970, Jac Holzman, head of Elektra, asked him to produce a new album for The Stooges. The album, Fun House, was their second, recorded in Los Angeles in two weeks, from May 11 to May 25, 1970. Gallucci was flown to New York to hear the band live; he was impressed and decided the album should have a "live performance" feel without actually being live. To emulate a live recording sound, he stripped off all of the studio carpeting and soundproofing and had singer Iggy Pop use a handheld microphone. Gallucci’s overdubbed electric organ was added to an alternate take of "Down on the Street", which was released as a single. AllMusic praised his producing of the album, recognizing his "energetic and immediate production". In 2003, Rolling Stone ranked Fun House No. 191 on their list of 500 Greatest Albums of All Time, maintaining the rating in a 2012 revision, and moving it up to No. 94 in the 2020 reboot of the list.

Also in 1970, he produced the first album by Crabby Appleton with one track, "Go Back", peaking at No. 36 on the Billboard chart. Gallucci changed his surname to "Caverhill" around 1973 and composed music for the 1974 films The Last Porno Flick and The Second Coming of Suzanne.

== Later events ==
Gallucci/Caverhill left the music business in 1977 and worked in real estate. He and his wife Debby previously lived in a home in Beverly Hills designed by architect Zoltan Pali. It was sold in 2020. The house was used in the music video for "Starboy" by The Weeknd and several television commercials.

In 1994, the Mummies released "Don Gallucci's Balls", a track from their 1994 album Party at Steve's House (Pin-Up Records 94012), as "a tribute to the Kingsmen member and Stooges producer".

In 2022, Caverhill released a digital album, Light.

== Discography ==
Albums

- The Kingsmen in Person — The Kingsmen — performer/composer — 1963
- Harpo — Jim Valley with Don and the Goodtimes — performer/composer — 1966
- So Good — Don and the Goodtimes — performer — 1967
- Where The Action Is! — Don and the Goodtimes — performer/composer — 1967
- Elyse — Elyse Weinberg — producer/performer — 1968
- Touch — Touch — performer/composer — 1968
- The Anders & Poncia Album — Anders & Poncia — performer — 1969
- Subway to the Country — David Ackles — performer — 1969
- Crabby Appleton — Crabby Appleton — producer — 1970
- Fun House — The Stooges — producer — 1970
- Richard Twice — Richard Twice — arranger/performer — 1970
- Simon Stokes and the Nighthawks — Simon Stokes and the Nighthawks — arranger — 1970
- Bring America Home — Timber — producer — 1971
- Gypsy Moth — Steve Ambrose — producer/composer/arranger/performer — 1972
- Rod Taylor — Rod Taylor — performer — 1973
- Catman — Sherman Hayes — arranger — 1973
- Rainbow Rider — Brothers — producer/arranger/performer — 1973
- Stepson — Stepson — performer — 1977
- Light — Don Caverhill — composer/arranger/performer — 2022

Singles

- "Take a Look at Me" — Mr. Lucky and the Gamblers — producer — 1966
- "Heaven Help The One" — High Flying Bird — producer — 1970
- "(It's Just a) Matter of Time"/"Steamboat" — Starbuck — producer — 1970
- "Rain" — Dorothy Morrison — arranger — 1972
- "Edna Scream"/"The Prophet" — Guy Brothers — producer/arranger — 1973

== Film and television ==
- The Last Porno Flick (aka Those Mad, Mad Moviemakers) — composer — 1974
- The Second Coming of Suzanne — composer — 1974
- Dear Darling — producer — 2005
- Crypto Game — composer — 2018
- Farewell — composer/actor — 2024
