= Tall Cool One (The Fabulous Wailers song) =

Single by The Fabulous Wailers
- B-side: "Road Runner"
- Released: 1959
- Genre: Garage rock
- Length: 2:30
- Label: Golden Crest
- Songwriters: Rich Dangel; Kent Morrill; John Greek

"Tall Cool One" is a 1959 instrumental song by The Fabulous Wailers.

== Background ==
The tune had originally been called "Scotch on the Rocks", but foreseeing problems with teen audiences, Golden Crest Records changed it to "Tall Cool One".

== Chart performance ==
A moderate success in 1959, the song was re-released in 1964 and entered the Top 100 a second time, charting as well as the first time around at number 38.

=== Chart history ===
Chart (1959)	Peak position
U.S. Billboard Hot 100	36

=== Chart history ===
Chart (1964) re-release	Peak position
U.S. Billboard Hot 100	38
Canada CHUM Chart	6
