= This Is the Sonics =

This Is The Sonics

Studio album by the Sonics
- Released: March 31, 2015
- Studios: Soundhouse Studios, Seattle, Washington, US
- Genre: Garage rock
- Length: 32:48
- Language: English
- Label: Revox
- Producer: Jim Diamond

The Sonics chronology
Sinderella (1980)	This Is The Sonics (2015)

This Is the Sonics is a 2015 studio album by American garage rock band the Sonics. Released via their own Revox label, it is the band's first full-length album of new material in 48 years. The album has received positive reviews from critics.

== Reception ==
Professional ratings
Review scores
Source	Rating
AllMusic	4/5 stars
The Austin Chronicle	3.5/5 stars
Consequence	C+
Pitchfork	7.5/10
PopMatters	6/10
Record Collector	3/5 stars
Rolling Stone	4/5 stars
Vancouver Sun	4/5 stars

Editors at AnyDecentMusic? rated this release 6.9 out of 10, aggregating seven reviews. According to the review aggregator Metacritic, This Is The Sonics received "generally favorable reviews" based on a weighted average score of 78 out of 100 from 13 critic scores.

Kenneth Partridge of The A.V. Club rated this album a B, writing that "the group leans heavy on covers, just like back in the day, and still excels at roughing up old blues and R&B tunes" and stating that the original songs are weaker tracks. Editors at AllMusic rated this album 4 out of 5 stars, with critic Mark Deming writing "This Is the Sonics is a joyously raw blast of full-bore garage rock stomp that comes perilously close to matching the furious energy of their iconic Etiquette Records sides from the '60s" and it is "an outstanding return to duty for one of the great primal rock & roll bands of the '60s". This album was also included among AllMusic's best of 2015. The Austin Chronicle published a review from critic Tim Stegall, who rated this album 3.5 out of 5 stars, stating that The Sonics are "more punk at 70 than a truckload of Sex Pistols 45s, and still decimate every other band in your record collection. In Classic Rock, Paul Moody scored This Is The Sonics 4 out of 5 stars, stating that "while nothing quite matches the brutalist stomps of your youth, there’s a savage intensity at work here". At Consequence of Sound, Adam Kivel rated this album a C+, praising individual tracks and elements and stating that some of the album is fun to listen to, but critiquing that "there are some distracting clunkers amidst the fun".

Keith Cameron of Mojo scored this album 3 out of 5 stars. stating that it "emits the same primal heat that's inspired successive generations of garage-dwellers, from The Cramps through Mudhoney to The White Stripes". Jason Heller of Pitchfork gave This Is The Sonics a 7.5 out of 10, stating that "The Sonics are alive and viciously well" and praised the choice to have Jim Diamond produce this music. Rich Giraldi of PopMatters rated this album a 6 out of 10, stating that it "plays out like the other three Sonics records: a gassed-up mixture of originals and rhythm and blues standards" that has some highlights, but also includes "missteps" and the production is too clean for the band's sound. In Rolling Stone, Will Hermes gave this album 4 out of 5 stars, praising the band's skill by stating that "they can still teach their garage offspring a thing or two" and also writing that "the new songs sound vintage; so do the covers".

== Track listing ==
1. "I Don't Need No Doctor" (Jo Armstead, Nick Ashford, Valerie Simpson) – 2:41
2. "Be a Woman" (Dave Faulkner) – 2:22
3. "Bad Betty" (Rob Lind, Jim Davies) – 2:08
4. "You Can't Judge a Book by the Cover" (Willie Dixon) – 2:56
5. "The Hard Way" (Ray Davies) – 2:14
6. "Sugaree" (Marty Robbins) – 2:36
7. "Leaving Here" (Holland–Dozier–Holland) – 2:55
8. "Look at Little Sister" (Hank Ballard) – 3:33
9. "I Got Your Number" (Bob Halligan Jr.) – 2:43
10. "Livin' in Chaos" (Freddie Dennis, the Sonics) – 3:04
11. "Save the Planet" (Gerry Roslie) – 3:04
12. "Spend the Night" (Lind) – 2:37

== Personnel ==
The Sonics

- Freddie Dennis – bass guitar, lead vocals
- Rob Lind – saxophone, harp, vocals
- Larry Parypa – guitar, vocals
- Gerry Roslie – piano, keyboards, lead vocals
- Dusty Watson – drums, vocals

Additional personnel

- Jim Davies – harp on "Leaving Here"
- Jim Diamond – keyboards, piano, production, engineering, mixing at Ghetto Recorders, mastering at Ghetto Recorders, Detroit, Michigan, United States
- Jack Endino – assistance
- Diego Figueroa – inside photography
- Erick Montes – artwork, layout
- Geoff Peveto – artwork, layout
- Kimberly Zsebe – back cover photography

== See also ==
- 2015 in American music
- List of 2015 albums
