= The Witch (song) =

Single by the Sonics

from the album Here Are the Sonics
- B-side: "Keep A-Knockin'"; "Psycho" (re-release)
- Released: November 1964; 1965 (re-release)
- Recorded: 1964
- Studio: Audio Recording, Seattle, Washington
- Genre: Garage rock; R&B; proto-punk; psychedelic rock
- Length: 2:40
- Label: Etiquette
- Songwriter: Gerry Roslie
- Producer: John "Buck" Ormsby

The Sonics singles chronology
"The Witch" (1964)	"Psycho" (1965)

"The Witch" is a song by the American garage rock band the Sonics, written by vocalist Gerry Roslie, and first released as the group's debut single in November 1964. It also appears on the Sonics' debut album Here Are the Sonics. Among the most frantic and heaviest rock recordings of the era, "The Witch" is regarded as quintessential in the development of punk rock despite the fact the tune never reached national success. Since the song's original release, "The Witch" has appeared on numerous compilation albums, most notably the 1998 reissue of Nuggets: Original Artyfacts from the First Psychedelic Era, 1965–1968.

== Background ==
The Sonics were founded in 1960, primarily performing as an R&B instrumental troupe with a shuffling line-up. In late-1963, the group's membership stabilized with the addition of three members of a local band known as the Searchers. Among them was keyboardist-turned-lead vocalist Gerry Roslie, who they discovered could sing in a similar style as Little Richard. With the reconfigured lineup, the Sonics became one of the more popular live attractions in the Northwest, and received attention from John "Buck" Ormsby, who played bass guitar for the Fabulous Wailers. Invited to a rehearsal session at drummer Bob Bennett's garage in 1964, Ormsby initially was unimpressed with the group's selection of cover songs. A prototype to the guitar riff that highlights "The Witch" was played, convincing Ormsby to sign the Sonics to his co-owned record label Etiquette Records.

Lyrically, "The Witch" was originally intended to be a composition about a local dance craze; however, it was re-written to describe a tale of a treacherous woman. The song also is marked by its pounding, stop-start melody, and a relentlessly aggressive tempo. One music critic writing for Penn's Picks advises listeners to take notice to "how Gerry Roslie’s raw, gravly vocals, Larry Parypa’s 'dark, overdriven' guitar (that rivals Dave Davies in tone) and Rob Lind’s raw saxophone work in perfect unison with one another in creating one hell on an intense song". Recording in Ormsby's Audio Recording Studio in Seattle, Washington, the Sonics were satisfied only when all the VU meters were continuously in the red, much to the dismay of the sound engineers.

== Release and reception ==
"The Witch" was released on the Sonics' debut single in November 1964. Backed by a cover of Little Richard's "Keep A-Knockin'", the song was too progressive for many markets, but eventually began receiving airplay through smaller radio stations in Seattle. Bassist Andy Parypa recalled how Seattle's KJR station played "The Witch": "O'Day later told me that eventually the song had reached number one in sales, but the station policy said it was too far out to chart at number one. The station only played it after kids got out of schools". Overall, the tune reached number two regionally, and was re-released in early-1965 with "Psycho", another Sonics original, to avoid paying royalties for their Little Richard cover. In March 1965, "The Witch" was featured as the opening track to the group's debut album Here Are the Sonics. The song was issued three other times by the band: in 1966, 1979, and 1998.

Although "The Witch" never broke the national charts, it remains an important composition in rock history. Arguably one of the heaviest songs of its era, "The Witch", along with "Psycho", inspired countless punk rock groups of the 1970s. In addition, the song is one of three tracks by the Sonics (the most of any band) featured on the 1998 reissue of the groundbreaking compilation album Nuggets: Original Artyfacts from the First Psychedelic Era, 1965–1968.
