= The Sonics =

American garage rock band

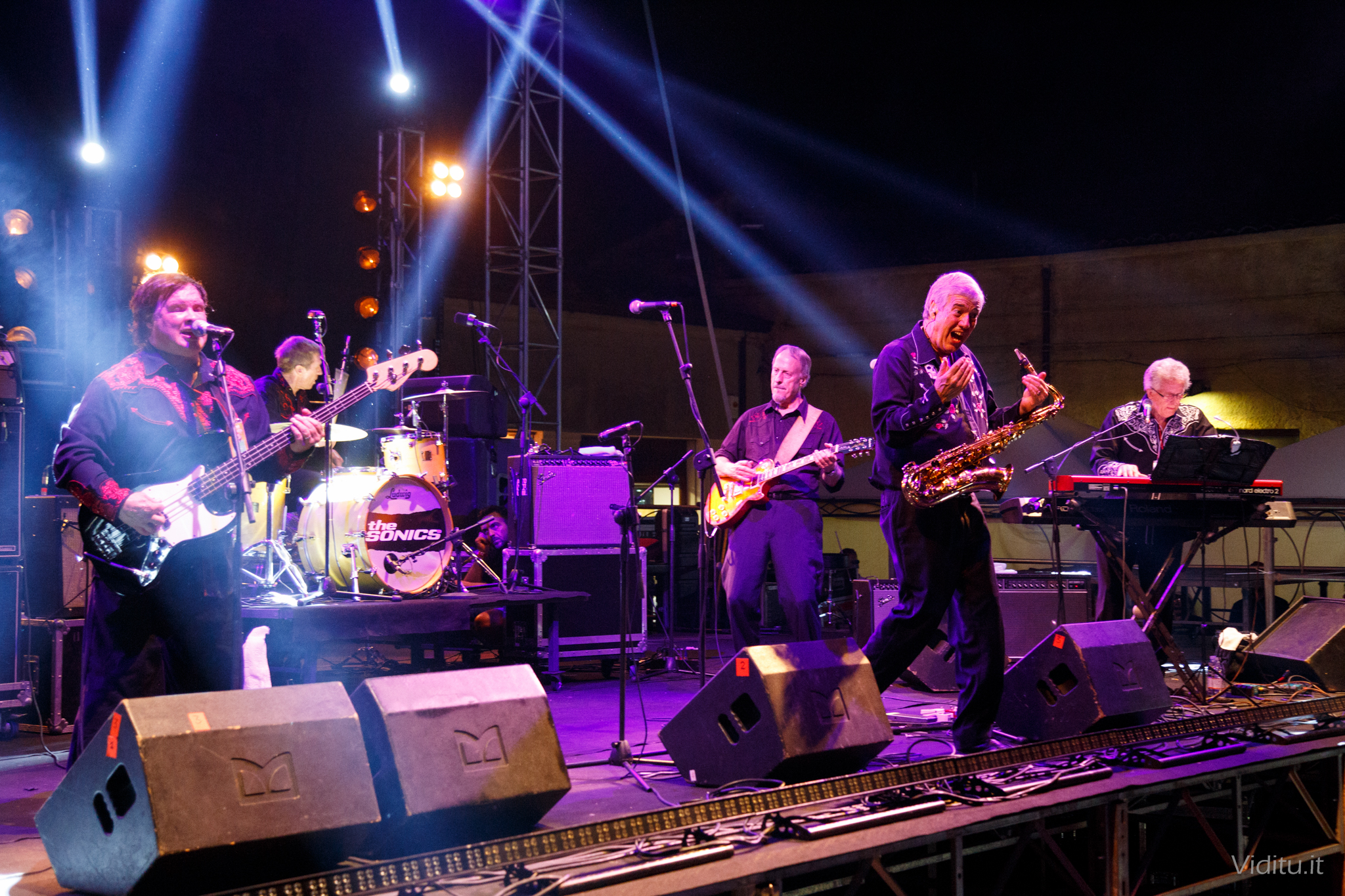
- The Sonics performing at Ypsigrock on August 7, 2015. Left to right: Freddie Dennis, Dusty Watson, Larry Parypa, Rob Lind, Gerry Roslie

Background information
- Origin: Tacoma, Washington, U.S.
- Genres: Garage rock; proto-punk; rock and roll
- Years active: 1960–1968; 1972; 1980; 2007–present
- Labels: Etiquette; Jerden; Bomp; Revox
- Members: Gerry Roslie; Rob Lind; Larry Parypa; Dusty Watson; Freddie Dennis
- Past members: Andy Parypa; Bob Bennett; Ricky Lynn Johnson; Don Wilhelm; Mitch Jaber; Stuart Turner; Jerry Parypa; Tony Mabin; Rich Koch; Marilyn Lodge; Bill Dean; Ray Michelsen; George Fencil-Wallace; Michael Gone; George Crowe; James Butsch; Suzie Kattayama; GoodTime Charlie Lewis

The Sonics are an American garage rock band from Tacoma, Washington, formed in 1960. Their aggressive, hard-edged sound has been a major influence on punk and garage music worldwide, and they have been named inspirations to the White Stripes, LCD Soundsystem, Nirvana, The Hives, and other musical artists.

The band performed several early rock standards such as "Louie, Louie" and "Skinny Minnie", as well as original compositions like "Strychnine", "Psycho" and "The Witch". Their catalogue is generally based around simple chord progressions, often performed with a speed and tonal aggression that was novel for the time, making the band a notable influence on later punk rock bands, such as the Stooges and the Cramps.

== Biography ==
=== 1960s ===
The Sonics were formed in 1960 in Tacoma, Washington by teen-aged guitarist Larry Parypa, with the encouragement of his music-loving parents. The earliest lineup included Parypa, drummer Mitch Jaber, and guitarist Stuart Turner; Parypa's brother Jerry briefly played saxophone, and their mother occasionally filled in on bass at rehearsals. In 1961, Parypa's older brother Andy became the bass player, and Tony Mabin took over as their new saxophone player.

When Turner left for the army, Rich Koch (who had previously played with the Wailers) joined as lead guitarist, and Marilyn Lodge became their first singer, the band having been an instrumental combo up to that point. A new drummer, Bill Dean, replaced Jaber.

Koch and Lodge left the band in 1963. Local star Ray Michelsen became the band's singer after having sung with several other popular bands on the local scene. Larry began looking for a drummer to replace Dean, who he felt was uncommitted to the band, and found Bob Bennett playing in a band called the Searchers, with keyboardist Gerry Roslie and sax player Rob Lind. Ray Michelsen was looking to leave the band, so the Parypas hired Bennett, Roslie, and Lind, and let their previous saxophonist Mabin go. The well-known lineup was in place, but the Sonics' career did not begin in earnest until 1964, when Gerry Roslie started singing lead vocals. With Roslie as lead singer, the band started playing gigs at local venues such as the Red Carpet, Olympia's Skateland, the Evergreen Ballroom, Perl's (Bremerton), the Spanish Castle Ballroom, and St. Mary's Parish Hall.

They soon were scouted by Buck Ormsby, bassist for popular Northwest band the Wailers, and signed to Etiquette Records, the Wailers' own record label. Their first single was "The Witch" (with Little Richard's "Keep A-Knockin" as the B-side) in November 1964. The record was popular with local kids, and went on to become the biggest selling local single in the history of the Northwest despite its radio airplay being restricted because of its bizarre subject matter.

Early in 1965, Etiquette released the Sonics' debut album, Here Are The Sonics, which was produced at Audio Recording in Seattle, Washington with famed Pacific Northwest recording engineer Kearney Barton. It was recorded on a two-track tape recorder, with only one microphone to pick up the entire drum kit. It was here that they began to pioneer some of their infamously reckless recording techniques. A second album, Boom, was followed in February 1966. During the recording, the Sonics ripped the soundproofing off the walls at the country and western-oriented Wiley/Griffith studio in Tacoma to "get a live-er sound." The covers of both albums feature the photography of Jini Dellaccio.

Their heyday began to come to a close when the band transferred to Jerden Records in late 1966, and headed to Hollywood to record the poorly selling album Introducing the Sonics with Larry Levine at Gold Star Studios. Although it has been rumoured that Jerden executives pushed the Sonics into a more polished sound, the band itself had decided to follow new influences in modern music, resulting in songs that were quite different from their raucous early recordings. The band, however, was not satisfied with the material on Introducing the Sonics, calling the cleaner, slicker recordings "the worst garbage".

The original band fell apart between 1966 and 1968, with members leaving to attend university or join other bands; saxophonist Rob Lind became a fighter pilot in the Vietnam War. Eventually, all of the original members left, except Gerry Roslie, with new members continuing on with the name Sonics (later 'Jim Brady and the Sonics') until 1980, although it was a completely different band, at times even incorporating string and horn sections.

=== Reformations ===
The original Sonics reunited briefly in 1972 for a live show at Seattle's Paramount Theater, with the recording of this show released as Live Fanz Only by Etiquette. In 1980, a new Sonics fronted by Gerry Roslie recorded the album Sinderella, which featured versions of the original band's material.

The emergence of punk rock in the late '70s and grunge in the '90s led to new interest in the Sonics, and much of their material was re-released by labels in the US and Europe. Larry and Andy Parypa continued performing with various bands in the Northwest, while Roslie, Lind, and Bennett pursued careers outside of music.

A further surge of interest in the Sonics was sparked by the use of their version of Richard Berry's "Have Love, Will Travel" in a 2004 Land Rover TV ad.

In 2007, the Sonics reunited again, this time for the Cavestomp garage rock festival in Brooklyn (November 2–4, 2007). The line up featured original members Gerry Roslie on vocals and keyboards, Larry Parypa on guitar, and Rob Lind on tenor sax, with Ricky Lynn Johnson (of the Wailers) on drums and Don Wilhelm (of the Daily Flash) on bass and vocals.

In 2008, the Sonics recorded a live session for Mark Lamarr's BBC Radio 2 show God's Jukebox on March 22. They played their first ever shows in London on Friday March 21 and Sunday March 23; later that year, "Have Love, Will Travel" was prominently featured on the soundtrack of Guy Ritchie's hit film RocknRolla.

Since then, they have played the Primavera Festival in Barcelona, followed by Bilbao, then the Sjock Festival in Belgium, Norway, and the Azkena Rock Festival in Vitoria in the Basque Country.

Their first show in their home region since their last Seattle reunion in 1972 was on Halloween 2008 at the Paramount Theatre in Seattle, where they were introduced and joined onstage for several songs by Steven Van Zandt. Kent Morrill (front man of the Wailers) made a surprise appearance to help sing his signature song "Dirty Robber". Bob Bennett was also present to sit in on drums albeit only for a few songs and only while Ricky Lynn Johnson played in unison.

In 2009, Freddie Dennis, formerly of Freddie and the Screamers, the Kingsmen, and the Liverpool 5, took Wilhelm's place as bassist and vocalist. The following year they released 8, an EP featuring both live cuts and four new songs produced by Larry Parypa and Jack Endino at Sound House Recording in Seattle.

In 2012, Johnson was replaced by drummer Dusty Watson, who has played with Slacktone, Agent Orange, Dick Dale, the Surfaris, Davie Allan and the Arrows, Lita Ford, the Supersuckers, The Boss Martians, Fur Dixon, Jon and the Nightriders, and others.

The Sonics headlined the fifth annual Muddy Roots Music Festival over Labor Day weekend in 2014. That same year, Muddy Roots Recordings published the previously unreleased song "Bad Betty" on a 7" record (split with Mudhoney) for Record Store Day.

On January 21, 2015, the band announced they would be releasing a new album, their first in over 40 years, entitled This Is The Sonics. The album was released via their own imprint, Revox on March 31. The band also announced a tour to support the new album.

On May 2, 2016, an announcement was posted by Rob Lind on the band's Facebook site that Gerry Roslie and Larry Parypa would no longer be continuing as touring members of the band although they will still be involved in recording and Larry will occasionally be playing live with the band. Their positions are being filled on a touring basis by Jake Cavaliere of the Lords of Altamont on keyboards and Evan Foster of the Boss Martians on guitar.

Drummer Bob Bennett died in February 2025.

== Influence ==
Kurt Cobain of Nirvana said in an interview with Nardwuar the Human Serviette on CITR-FM, discussing drum sounds, "I, I have to admit...The Sonics recorded very, very cheaply on a two track you know, and they just used one microphone over the drums, and they got the most amazing drum sound I've ever heard. Still to this day, it's still my favorite drum sound. It sounds like he's hitting harder than anyone I've ever known."

The White Stripes named The Sonics as one of the bands that influenced them the most, calling them "the epitome of '60s punk" and claiming they were "harder than the Kinks, and punk long before punk".

LCD Soundsystem repeatedly name-checked The Sonics, among other bands, in their debut single, "Losing My Edge".

Nicholaus Arson of the Hives cites The Sonics' version of "Have Love, Will Travel" as a favorite.

The German country band the BossHoss named themselves after the Sonics' song "Boss Hoss".

A 1993 tribute album entitled Here Ain't The Sonics was released on PopLlama Records, featuring contributions from Mono Men, Screaming Trees, Thee Headcoats, the Cynics, Mojo Nixon and the Original Sins.

== Band members ==
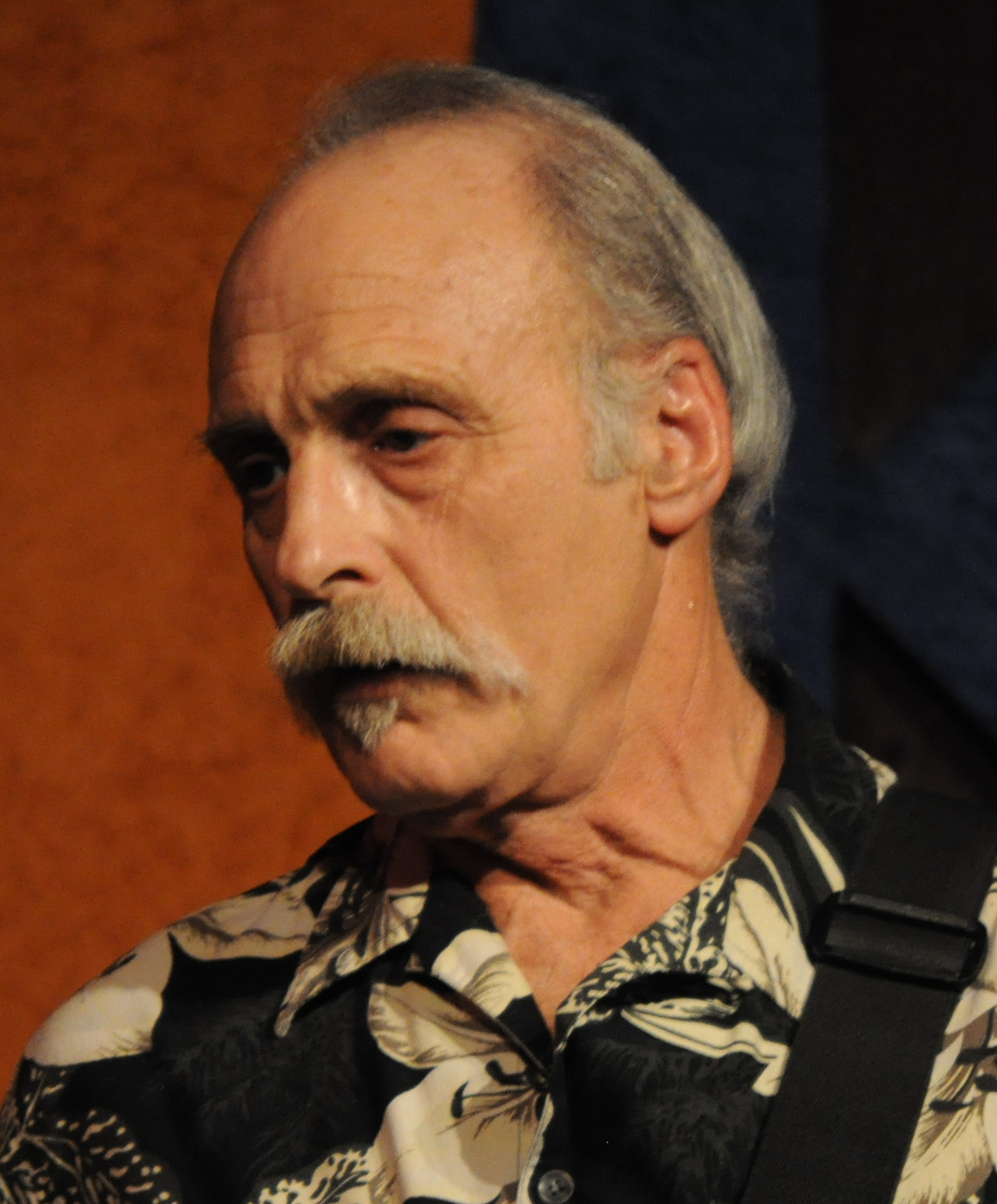
Andy Parypa, 2011

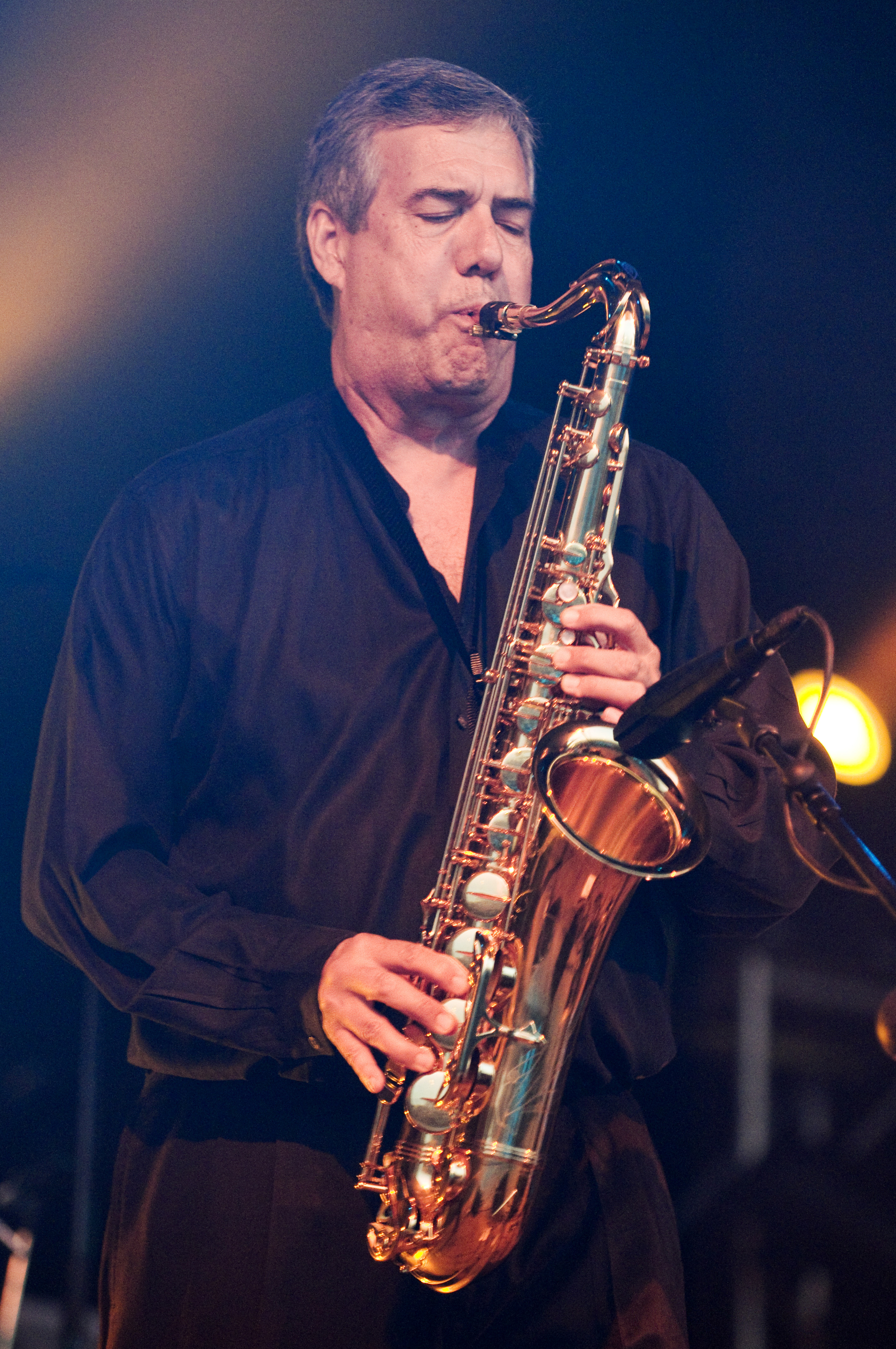
Rob Lind, 2008

The classic Sonics lineup, as recorded on Here Are The Sonics and Boom:

- Rob Lind – saxophone, vocals, harmonica
- Gerry Roslie – organ, piano, lead vocals
- Andy Parypa – bass guitar, vocals
- Larry Parypa – lead guitar, vocals
- Bob Bennett – drums

Current touring lineup:

- Rob Lind – saxophone, vocals, harmonica
- Dusty Watson – drums
- Freddie Dennis – bass guitar, vocals
- Jake Cavaliere – keyboards, vocals
- Evan Foster – guitar

In 2016, it was announced that Roslie and Larry Parypa would no longer tour with the band. They were replaced by Cavaliere and Foster. Saxophonist Lind is the sole original member in the touring band.

Timeline

== Discography ==
=== Studio albums ===
- Here Are The Sonics (Etiquette Records, 1965)
- Boom (Etiquette, 1966)
- Introducing the Sonics (Jerden, 1967)
- Sinderella (Bomp, 1980)
- This Is the Sonics (Revox, 2015) #21 Billboard Heatseekers; #25 Billboard Tastemakers

=== Compilations and live albums ===
- Merry Christmas (Various Artists album, Etiquette, 1966)
- Explosives (Buckshot, 1973)
- The Sonics (SRT, 1978)
- Fire and Ice (First American, 1983; re-released as Fire & Ice: Lost Tapes Vols. 1 & 2 in 1996)
- Full Force! (Line, 1984; re-released as Full Force! The Best of The Sonics in 1987)
- The Ultimate Sonics (Etiquette, 1991)
- Maintaining My Cool (Jerden, Munster Records, 1991)
- Psycho-Sonic (Big Beat, 1993)
- This Is... The Savage Young Sonics (Norton, 2001)
- The Jerden Years 1966-69 (Munster, 2004)
- Busy Body!!! Live in Tacoma 1964 (Live, Norton, 2007)
- The Sonics Live at Easy Street Record Store Day Release (Re:VOX & Easy Street Records 2016)

=== Singles ===
- "The Witch" / "Keep A-Knockin'" (Etiquette, 1964)
- "The Witch" / "Psycho" (Etiquette, 1965)
- "Psycho" / "Keep A-Knockin'" (Etiquette, 1965)
- "Boss Hoss" / "The Hustler" (Etiquette, 1965)
- "Don't Be Afraid Of The Dark" / "Shot Down" (Etiquette, 1965)
- The Sonics' "Don't Believe In Christmas" / The Wailers' "Christmas Spirit" (Etiquette, 1965)
- "Cinderella" / "Louie Louie" (Etiquette, 1965)
- "You Got Your Head On Backwards" / "Love Light" (Jerden, 1966)
- "Like No Other Man" / "Love Light" (Jerden, 1966)
- "The Witch" / "Like No Other Man" (Jerden, 1966)
- "Psycho" / "Maintaining My Cool" (Jerden, 1966)
- "Love-itis" / "You're In Love" (Jerden, 1967)
- "Lost Love" / "Any Way The Wind Blows" (Piccadilly, 1967)
- "Any Way The Wind Blows" / "Lost Love" (UNI, 1967)
- "Dirty Old Man" / "Bama Lama Bama Loo" (Burdette, 1975)
- "The Witch" / "Bama Lama Bama Loo" (Great Northwest, 1979)
- "The Witch" / "Keep A-Knockin'" (Norton, 1998)
- "Psycho" / "Have Love Will Travel" (Norton, 1998)
- "Cinderella" / "He's Waitin'" (Norton, 1998)
- "Boss Hoss" / "The Hustler" (Norton, 1998)
- "Strychnine" / "Shot Down" (Norton, 1998)
- The Sonics' "Louie Louie" / The Wailers' "Louie Louie" (Norton, 1998)
- "Don't Believe In Christmas" / "Santa Claus" (Norton, 1998)
- "Bad Betty" / "I Like It Small" [Mudhoney] (Muddy Roots, 2014)

=== EPs ===
- Live Fanz Only (Live at Seattle's Paramount Theater, 1972) (Etiquette, 1986)
- 8 (The Sonics Record Co./Re:Vox, 2010, 2011 on Re:Vox)
