= Evergreen Ballroom =

Former event venue in Olympia, Washington (1931-2000)

Coordinates: 47°02′11″N 122°44′46″W

The Evergreen Ballroom was a music venue at 9121 Pacific Avenue SE in Olympia, Washington. Referred to as "The 'Green" by locals, it was a popular dancehall for nearly 70 years. In its heyday, famous musical acts of all genres performed at the Evergreen. The venue served as a central community gathering place until it was destroyed by a fire in 2000.

== History ==
On May 23, 1931, contractors William Sholund and Emmett Brown opened the Evergreen Pavilion along a section of U.S. Route 99 called the "old Tacoma and Olympia Highway" (now Pacific Avenue). It was a prime location between Seattle and Portland, Oregon. Less than six months after opening, the Evergreen was mysteriously destroyed by fire on November 9, 1931.

The new Evergreen dance hall was opened by Sholund on July 25, 1932. At the time, it was one of the largest maple-floor ballrooms in the United States, measuring 74 by 120 ft. It cost $15,000 to build and more than 140,000 ft of lumber was used for the construction. The venue featured plywood furnishing, state-of-the-art ventilation, an orchestra shell, and a restaurant ran by Sholund's wife Mary Sholund.

Sholund, who played the violin, led the ballroom's house band, which included his own sons: trumpeter Irving Sholund, clarinet and saxophonist Ronald Sholund, and drummer Vernon Sholund. He also booked regional bands such as the Mere Howard Orchestra and the Merle Howard Orchestra to play at dances. Sholund operated the Evergreen Ballroom until his death in 1946.

During the Swing era when jazz was the most popular genre of music, Sholund diversified the acts he booked. Famous big band bandleaders such as Louis Armstrong, Duke Ellington, Count Basie, Benny Goodman, Harry James, and Lionel Hampton performed at the Evergreen in the 1940s. These shows would broadcast live via KTAC in Tacoma, Washington.

In the 1950s and 1960s, the Evergreen was a tour stop for leading rockabilly, rock 'n' roll, blues, and rhythm & blues acts of the day. Among the notable performers to be showcased were Fats Domino, Little Richard, Chuck Berry, Jerry Lee Lewis, Johnny Cash, Ray Charles, James Brown, B.B. King, Ike & Tina Turner, Jackie Wilson, and Marvin Gaye.

The Sholund family owned the Evergreen until Irving Sholund died in 1963. The venue was sold to real estate developer and broker Richard Campbell in 1964. By the late 1970s, the Evergreen was rundown and had changed ownership a few times. In December 1983, drummer Fon Morcus purchased the Evergreen and proposed to open a "semi-nude, Las Vegas showgirl production." His plan was opposed by the county commissioners, but he eventually won the case. After a few months of strip shows at the venue, Morcus switched the entertainment to country western.

In the late 1990s, J.B. Johnson, a local disc jockey convinced Morcus to make some changes to modernize the Evergreen by playing "a more contemporary mix of hip-hop, top 40, R&B and alternative music." The Evergreen emerged as the home of a local hip-hop scene that held annual talent shows in 1998 and 1999.

By 2000, billiard tournaments were being held at the venue and there were talks of opening up a casino.

The Evergreen was destroyed by arson on July 20, 2000. The building was not insured at the time of the fire.

== Notable performers ==
Notable acts who performed at the Evergreen Ballroom include:

- Fred Astaire
- Ginger Rogers
- Duke Ellington
- Earl Hines
- Lionel Hampton
- Jack Teagarden
- Louis Armstrong
- Charlie Parker
- Nat King Cole
- Fats Domino
- Bo Diddley
- Bobby "Blue" Bland
- Little Junior Parker
- Little Richard
- Little Willie John
- Johnny Cash
- Etta James
- Jerry Lee Lewis
- Chuck Berry
- Little Richard
- B.B. King
- Ike & Tina Turner
- James Brown
- Marvin Gaye
- Hank Ballard
