= The Fabulous Wailers =

American rock band (principally 1958–1969)

- Origin: Tacoma, Washington, United States
- Genres: Proto-punk; rock and roll; frat rock; garage rock; instrumental rock
- Years active: 1958–1969; Occasional later reunions
- Labels: Golden Crest, Etiquette, United Artists, Bell
- Past members: Original line-up: John Greek; Richard Dangel; Kent Morrill; Mike Burk; Mark Marush; Later members: "Rockin' Robin" Roberts; John "Buck" Ormsby; Gail Harris; Ron Gardner; Neil Andersson; Dave Roland; Denny Weaver
- Website: http://www.thefabulouswailers.com/

The Wailers, often known as The Fabulous Wailers, were an American rock band from Tacoma, Washington. They became popular in the Pacific Northwest from the late 1950s to the early 1960s, performing saxophone-driven R&B and Chuck Berry rock and roll. Their biggest hit was "Tall Cool One", first released in 1959, and they have been credited as being "one of the very first, if not the first, of the American garage bands."

== Career ==
The group was formed – originally as The Nitecaps – in 1958, by five high school friends:

- John Greek (27 October 1940 – 6 October 2006) – rhythm guitar, trumpet
- Richard Dangel (1 December 1942 – 2 December 2002) – lead guitar
- Kent Morrill (2 April 1941 – 15 April 2011) – keyboards, vocals
- Mark Marush (15 August 1940 – 9 August 2007) – tenor sax
- Mike Burk (b. 1942) – drums

In late 1958, the group recorded a demo of an instrumental written by Dangel, Morrill and Greek, which found its way to Clark Galehouse of New York based Golden Crest Records. He liked the track and had it re-recorded by the band in Lakewood in February 1959; its title "Tall Cool One" was apparently suggested by Morrill's mother. Released as a single, it reached # 36 on the Billboard Hot 100 and # 24 on the R&B chart. The band made the cross-country trip to New York to record an LP, The Fabulous Wailers, which was released in December 1959 and featured two vocals by Morrill as well as instrumentals. They also appeared on Dick Clark's nationally televised American Bandstand, and toured the east coast. A second instrumental from their first recording session, "Mau-Mau", made # 68 on the Billboard pop chart, but their third single, "Wailin'", failed to make the chart.

The band decided to return to the Northwest, rather than staying in New York as their record label wished, and they were dropped from their contract. Around the same time, they added lead vocalist "Rockin' Robin" Roberts (Lawrence Fewell Roberts II), a charismatic frontman who had previously been the singer with rival Tacoma band the Bluenotes. John Greek left the group in acrimonious circumstances, and was replaced by bassist John "Buck" Ormsby (b. Seattle, 1941–2016). Ormsby, Morrill and Roberts then formed Etiquette Records and, in 1961, the label released its first single, a cover version of Richard Berry's "Louie Louie". For contractual reasons the single was credited to Roberts, but was performed by the whole band. Their recording became a local hit and was distributed nationally by Imperial Records, but did not make the national chart. However, its style, with its trademark 1-2-3, 1-2, 1-2-3 riff, inspired other groups from the Seattle area, most notably the Kingsmen of Portland, Oregon, to record the same song.

The Wailers continued to perform locally and, according to Morrill, one of their biggest fans was the young Jimi Hendrix, then starting to perform guitar. The band performed both with and without Roberts, who studied at the University of Washington, the University of Puget Sound, and Oregon State University, eventually achieving a master's degree in biochemistry. They also occasionally featured teenage girl singer Gail Harris, notably on the live album The Fabulous Wailers at the Castle, recorded in 1961, which has been described as "undoubtedly one of the most influential albums in Seattle rock & roll history." In all, the band recorded and released four albums on their own Etiquette label between 1962 and 1966, as well as a succession of singles. They also helped instigate the recording career of The Sonics, whose first two albums were issued by the label, and helped begin Jini Dellaccio's career as a rock'n'roll photographer when they hired her to shoot cover photos for their album Wailers, Wailers, Everywhere.

Mark Marush left The Wailers in 1962 and was replaced by Ron Gardner, who also handled lead vocals; Dangel and Burk left in 1964 and were replaced by guitarist Neil Andersson and drummer Dave Roland respectively. Continuing to perform live as well as recording, the band added a trio of girl backing singers, known as the Marshans. Also in 1964, "Tall Cool One" was re-promoted by the Golden Crest label, and again made the Billboard pop chart, this time peaking at # 38. In 1965 Roberts made his final recordings with the group, and, in 1967, guitarist Neil Andersson was replaced by Denny Weaver. Roberts was killed, aged 27, in a car crash in late 1967.

The band split up in 1969, by which time Kent Morrill was the only remaining original member. Morrill, Dangel and Ormsby, with other musicians, reunited as The Wailers for occasional concerts from the 1970s onwards. In 1979, they joined with Burk, Gardner, and Gail Harris to play a reunion show.

== Later activities ==
Ormsby re-established the Etiquette label in the mid-1980s, and issued a Wailers compilation, The Boys from Tacoma, in 1993. The Wailers' song "Out of Our Tree" was featured in the 1998 CD version of the Nuggets: Original Artyfacts From the First Psychedelic Era collection. Several of the Wailers' tunes were also covered by The Ventures, and the two bands released an album together, Two Car Garage, in 2009 to celebrate their 50 years in existence.

Ron Gardner died in 1992. Richard Dangel died of an aneurysm in 2002. John Greek died in 2006, Mark Marush in 2007, and Kent Morrill died of cancer on 15 April 2011. Ormsby died in Mexico on his 75th birthday, October 29, 2016.

== Discography ==
=== Studio albums ===
- The Fabulous Wailers (Golden Crest, 1959) (also known as The Wailer's (sic) Wail)
- The Fabulous Wailers At The Castle (Etiquette, 1962)
- Wailers and Company (Etiquette, 1963)
- Wailers, Wailers, Everywhere (Etiquette, 1965)
- Out of Our Tree (Etiquette, 1966)
- Outburst! (United Artists, 1966)
- Walk Thru The People (Bell, 1968)

=== Collaborative albums ===
- Merry Christmas (with the Galaxies and the Sonics, Etiquette, 1965)
- Two Car Garage (with The Ventures, Blue Horizon, 2009)

=== Compilations ===
- Tall Cool One (Imperial, 1964)
- The Boys from Tacoma (compilation, Etiquette, 1993)

=== Singles ===
- "Tall Cool One" (Golden Crest, 1959)
- "Mau-Mau" (Golden Crest, 1959)
- "Wailin'" (Golden Crest, 1960)
- "Louie Louie" (Rockin' Robin Roberts with the Wailers, Etiquette, 1961)
- "Mashi" (Etiquette, 1962)
- "Doin' the Seaside" (Etiquette, 1962)
- "We're Goin' Surfin'" (Etiquette, 1963)
- "Seattle" (Etiquette, 1963)
- "Frenzy" (Etiquette, 1964)
- "Don't Take It So Hard" (Etiquette, 1964)
- "You Weren't Using Your Head" (Etiquette, 1965)
- "Dirty Robber" (Etiquette, 1965)
- "Out of Our Tree" (Etiquette, 1965)
- "It's You Alone" (Etiquette / United Artists, 1966)
- "Think Kindly Baby" (Etiquette / United Artists, 1966)
- "You Won't Lead Me On" (United Artists, 1966)
- "I'm Determined" (Viva, 1967)
- "You Can't Fly" (Bell, 1968)
