= List of songs recorded by Iggy Pop =

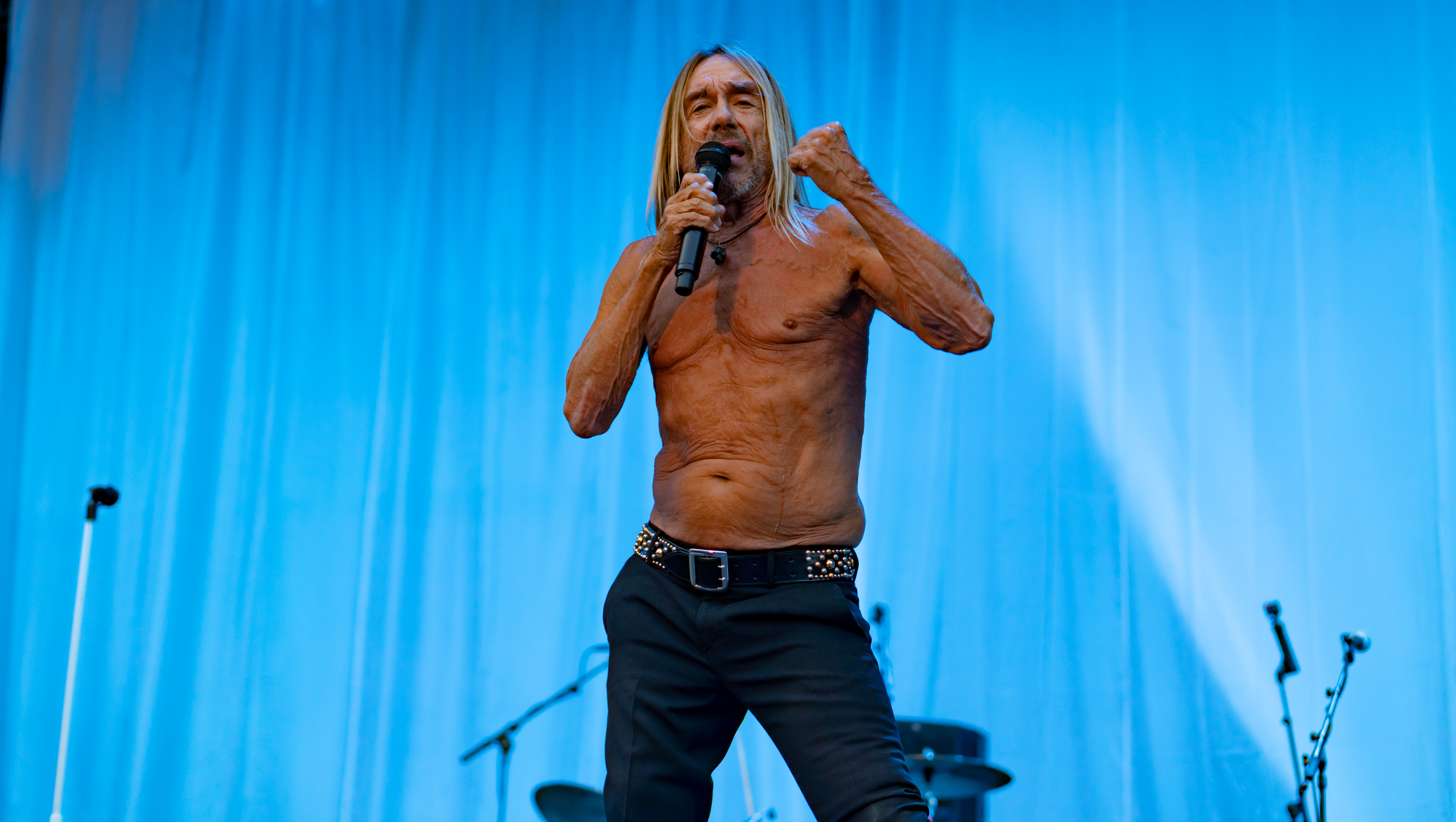
Iggy Pop performing in 2018

American musician Iggy Pop has recorded over 300 songs in a career spanning six decades. Known as the "Godfather of Punk", he began his career as a drummer with local bands from Ann Arbor, Michigan, including the Iguanas, who recorded several songs in the studio in 1965, among them a cover of Bo Diddley's "Mona" and Pop's first original, "Again and Again". After departing that group, he joined the Prime Movers, in which the band members gave him the nickname "Iggy". From 1967 to 1974, Pop was the frontman of the rock band the Stooges, who released three albums–The Stooges (1969), Fun House (1970), and Raw Power (1973), which were not commercially successful but were influential in the development of punk rock.

After the breakup of the Stooges, Pop launched a solo career with two albums produced by David Bowie, The Idiot and Lust for Life, both released in 1977. The same year, a group of recordings Pop made with former Stooges member James Williamson was released as Kill City. Pop reunited with Williamson for 1979's New Values, after which Pop experimented with new wave sounds on Soldier (1980), Party (1981), and Zombie Birdhouse (1982). He reteamed with Bowie on 1986's Blah-Blah-Blah, featuring his first hit single in the US, a cover of Johnny O'Keefe's "Real Wild Child (Wild One)". In 1990, he had his first top 20 hit with "Candy", a duet with Kate Pierson of the B-52s, from the album Brick by Brick. Throughout the 1990s, he continued recording, releasing American Caesar in 1993, the Stooges-like Naughty Little Doggie in 1996, and the less-intense Avenue B in 1999.

Pop has continued to experiment and collaborate since the 2000s. For 2003's Skull Ring, Pop recorded with his former Stooges bandmates, the Trolls (a Pop-fronted rock band who made their debut on 2001's Beat 'Em Up), Peaches, Green Day, and Sum 41. He toured again with the Stooges and released two more albums with them: 2007's The Weirdness and 2013's Ready to Die. Pop also released the jazzy Préliminaires in 2009 and the French-sung Après in 2012. In 2016, Pop teamed with Josh Homme, Dean Fertita, and Matt Helders for Post Pop Depression. These were followed by the jazzy, atmospheric Free in 2019 and Every Loser in 2023, a return to punk rock. Pop has released collaborations with Underworld, Kesha, Praxis, Teddybears, and Catherine Graindorge.

== Songs ==
Key
†	Indicates songs not written or co-written by Iggy Pop

Name of song, artist(s), writer(s), original release, producer(s) and year of release
Song	Artist(s)	Writer(s)	Original release	Producer(s)	Year	Ref(s)
"1969"	The Stooges	Dave Alexander; Ron Asheton; Scott Asheton; Iggy Pop	The Stooges	John Cale	1969	
"1970"	The Stooges	Dave Alexander; Ron Asheton; Scott Asheton; Iggy Pop	Fun House	Don Gallucci	1970	
"The Acid Lands"	Opening Performance Orchestra, Bill Laswell, Iggy Pop, featuring William S. Burroughs	William S. Burroughs †	The Acid Lands (Opening Performance Orchestra album)	–	2020	
"Afraid to Get Close"	Iggy Pop	Iggy Pop	Avenue B	Don Was	1999	
"African Man"	Iggy Pop	Iggy Pop	New Values	James Williamson	1979	
"Again and Again"	The Iguanas	Nick Kolokithas; Jim Osterberg	The Iguanas	–	1996	
"All the Way Down"	Iggy Pop	Iggy Pop; Andrew Watt; Stone Gossard; Chad Smith	Every Loser	Andrew Watt	2023	
"Ambition"	Iggy Pop	Glen Matlock †	Soldier	Pat Moran	1980	
"American Valhalla"	Iggy Pop	Iggy Pop; Josh Homme	Post Pop Depression	Josh Homme	2016	
"Angel"	Iggy Pop	Iggy Pop; Scott Thurston	New Values	James Williamson	1979	
"Angry Hills"	Iggy Pop	Iggy Pop; Rob Duprey	Zombie Birdhouse	Chris Stein	1982	
"Ann"	The Stooges	Dave Alexander; Ron Asheton; Scott Asheton; Iggy Pop	The Stooges	John Cale	1969	
"ATM"	The Stooges	Iggy Pop; Ron Asheton; Scott Asheton	The Weirdness	Steve Albini	2007	
"Avenue B"	Iggy Pop	Iggy Pop	Avenue B	Don Was	1999	
"Baby"	Iggy Pop	Iggy Pop; David Bowie	The Idiot	David Bowie	1977	
"Baby, It Can't Fall"	Iggy Pop	Iggy Pop; David Bowie	Blah-Blah-Blah	David Bowie; David Richards	1986	
"The Ballad of Cookie McBride"	Iggy Pop	Iggy Pop; Rob Duprey	Zombie Birdhouse	Chris Stein	1982	
"Bang Bang"	Iggy Pop	Iggy Pop; Ivan Král	Party	Tommy Boyce	1981	
"Beat Em Up"	Iggy Pop	Iggy Pop; Whitey Kirst	Beat 'Em Up	Iggy Pop	2001	
"Beat That Guy"	Iggy and the Stooges	Iggy Pop; James Williamson	Ready to Die	James Williamson	2013	
"Bells & Circles"	Underworld and Iggy Pop	Rick Smith; Karl Hyde; Iggy Pop	Teatime Dub Encounters	Rick Smith	2018	
"Beside You"	Iggy Pop	Iggy Pop; Steve Jones	American Caesar	Malcolm Burn	1993	
"Beyond the Law"	Iggy Pop and James Williamson	Iggy Pop; James Williamson	Kill City	James Williamson	1977	
"Billy Is a Runaway"	Iggy Pop	Iggy Pop; Scott Thurston	New Values	James Williamson	1979	
"Blah-Blah-Blah"	Iggy Pop	Iggy Pop; David Bowie	Blah-Blah-Blah	David Bowie; David Richards	1986	
"Blood on Your Cool"	Iggy Pop featuring the Trolls	Iggy Pop; Whitey Kirst; Alex Kirst; Pete Marshall	Skull Ring	Iggy Pop	2003	
"Boogie Boy"	Iggy Pop	Iggy Pop	American Caesar	Malcolm Burn	1993	
"Break into Your Heart"	Iggy Pop	Iggy Pop; Josh Homme	Post Pop Depression	Josh Homme	2016	
"Brick by Brick"	Iggy Pop	Iggy Pop	Brick by Brick	Don Was	1990	
"Bulldozer"	Iggy Pop	Iggy Pop; Rob Duprey	Zombie Birdhouse	Chris Stein	1982	
"Burn"	Iggy and the Stooges	Iggy Pop; James Williamson	Ready to Die	James Williamson	2013	
"Butt Town"	Iggy Pop	Iggy Pop	Brick by Brick	Don Was	1990	
"Caeser"	Iggy Pop	Iggy Pop; Eric Schermerhorn	American Caesar	Malcolm Burn	1993	
"California Sun" (Joe Jones cover)	The Iguanas	Henry Glover †	The Iguanas	–	1996	
"Candy"	Iggy Pop featuring Kate Pierson	Iggy Pop	Brick by Brick	Don Was	1990	
"Chains"	Iggy Pop	Iggy Pop; James Williamson; Scott Thurston	New Values (2000 reissue)	James Williamson	2000	
"Character"	Iggy Pop	Iggy Pop; Eric Schermerhorn	American Caesar	Malcolm Burn	1993	
"China Girl"	Iggy Pop	Iggy Pop; David Bowie	The Idiot	David Bowie	1977	
"Chocolate Drops"	Iggy Pop	Iggy Pop; Josh Homme; Dean Fertita	Post Pop Depression	Josh Homme	2016	
"Claustrophobia"	The Stooges	Iggy Pop; Ron Asheton; Scott Asheton	The Weirdness (Vinyl-edition only)	Steve Albini	2007	
"Cold Metal"	Iggy Pop	Iggy Pop	Instinct	Bill Laswell	1988	
"Come Back Tomorrow"	Iggy Pop	Iggy Pop	B-side of "Wild America" (EP)	Malcolm Burn	1993	
"Comments"	Iggy Pop	Iggy Pop; Andrew Watt; Eric Avery; Taylor Hawkins	Every Loser	Andrew Watt	2023	
"Consolation Prizes"	Iggy Pop and James Williamson	Iggy Pop; James Williamson	Kill City	James Williamson	1977	
"Corruption"	Iggy Pop	Iggy Pop; Whitey Kirst; Hal Cragin	Avenue B	Don Was	1999	
"Credit Card"	Iggy Pop	Iggy Pop	B-side of "Wild America"	Malcolm Burn	1993	
"Cry for Love"	Iggy Pop	Iggy Pop; Steve Jones	Blah-Blah-Blah	David Bowie; David Richards	1986	
"Curiosity"	Iggy Pop	Iggy Pop; Scott Thurston	New Values	James Williamson	1979	
"DD's"	Iggy and the Stooges	Iggy Pop; James Williamson	Ready to Die	James Williamson	2013	
"The Dawn"	Iggy Pop	Iggy Pop; Noveller	Free	Noveller	2019	
"Dead Rock Star"	Iggy Pop featuring the Stooges	Iggy Pop; Ron Asheton; Scott Asheton	Skull Ring	Iggy Pop	2003	
"Death is Certain"	Iggy Pop	Iggy Pop; Whitey Kirst	Beat 'Em Up	Iggy Pop	2001	
"Death Trip"	Iggy and the Stooges	Iggy Pop; James Williamson	Raw Power	Iggy Pop	1973	
"The Departed"	Iggy and the Stooges	Iggy Pop; James Williamson; Scott Asheton	Ready to Die	James Williamson	2013	
"The Dictator"	Catherine Graindorge featuring Iggy Pop	Iggy Pop	The Dictator	Catherine Graindorge	2022	
"Dirt"	The Stooges	Dave Alexander; Ron Asheton; Scott Asheton; Iggy Pop	Fun House	Don Gallucci	1970	
"Dirty Deal"	Iggy and the Stooges	Iggy Pop; James Williamson	Ready to Die	James Williamson	2013	
"Dirty Love"	Kesha featuring Iggy Pop	Kesha Sebert; Iggy Pop; Lukasz Gottwald; Pebe Sebert; Matt Squire; Henry Walter	Warrior (Kesha album)	Dr. Luke; Cirkut; Matt Squire	2012	
"Dirty Sanchez"	Iggy Pop	Leron Thomas †	Free	Leron Thomas	2019	
"Do Not Go Gentle into That Good Night"	Iggy Pop	Dylan Thomas; Noveller †	Free	Noveller	2019	
"Dog Food"	Iggy Pop	Iggy Pop	Soldier	Pat Moran	1980	
"Don't Look Down"	Iggy Pop	Iggy Pop; James Williamson	New Values	James Williamson	1979	
"Down on the Street"	The Stooges	Dave Alexander; Ron Asheton; Scott Asheton; Iggy Pop	Fun House	Don Gallucci	1970	
"Drink New Blood"	Iggy Pop	Iggy Pop; Whitey Kirst	Beat 'Em Up	Iggy Pop	2001	
"Drop a Hook"	Iggy Pop	Iggy Pop	Soldier (2000 reissue)	Pat Moran	2000	
"Dum Dum Boys"	Iggy Pop	Iggy Pop; David Bowie	The Idiot	David Bowie	1977	
"Dying Breed"	Iggy and the Stooges	Iggy Pop; James Williamson	Ready to Die (iTunes edition only)	James Williamson	2013	
"Easy Rider"	Iggy Pop	Iggy Pop; Steve Jones	Instinct	Bill Laswell	1988	
"Eat or Be Eaten"	Iggy Pop	Iggy Pop; Rob Duprey	Zombie Birdhouse	Chris Stein	1982	
"Eggs on a Plate"	Iggy Pop	Iggy Pop; Ivan Král	Party	Thom Panunzio	1981	
"The End of Christianity"	The Stooges	Iggy Pop; Ron Asheton; Scott Asheton	The Weirdness	Steve Albini	2007	
"The Endless Sea"	Iggy Pop	Iggy Pop	New Values	James Williamson	1979	
"Español"	Iggy Pop	Iggy Pop; Whitey Kirst	Avenue B	Don Was	1999	
"Et si tu n'existais pas" (Joe Dassin cover)	Iggy Pop	Vito Pallavicini; Pierre Delanoë; Claude Lemesle; Pasquale Losito; Salvatore Cutugno †	Après	Hal Cragin	2012	
"European Son" (The Velvet Underground cover)	Iggy Pop & Matt Sweeney	Lou Reed; John Cale; Sterling Morrison; Maureen Tucker †	I'll Be Your Mirror: A Tribute to The Velvet Underground & Nico	Matt Sweeney	2021	
"Everybody's Talkin'" (Fred Neil cover)	Iggy Pop	Fred Neil †	Après	Hal Cragin	2012	
"Evil California"	Annie Ross & the Low Note Quintet featuring Iggy Pop & Anthony Coleman	Iggy Pop; Terry Adams	B-side of "Wild America"	Hal Willner	1993	
"Facade"	Iggy Pop	Iggy Pop	Avenue B	Don Was	1999	
"Fall in Love with Me"	Iggy Pop	Iggy Pop; Hunt Sales; Tony Sales	Lust for Life	David Bowie; Iggy Pop; Colin Thurston	1977	
"Fire Girl"	Iggy Pop	Iggy Pop; Steve Jones	Blah-Blah-Blah	David Bowie; David Richards	1986	
"Five Foot One"	Iggy Pop	Iggy Pop	New Values	James Williamson	1979	
"Football"	Iggy Pop	Iggy Pop; Whitey Kirst	Beat 'Em Up	Iggy Pop	2001	
"Free"	Iggy Pop	Iggy Pop; Noveller	Free	Noveller	2019	
"Free & Freaky"	The Stooges	Iggy Pop; Ron Asheton; Scott Asheton	The Weirdness	Steve Albini	2007	
"Frenzy"	Iggy Pop	Iggy Pop; Andrew Watt; Duff McKagan; Chad Smith	Every Loser	Andrew Watt	2023	
"Fuckin' Alone"	Iggy Pop	Iggy Pop; Eric Schermerhorn	American Caesar	Malcolm Burn	1993	
"Fun House"	The Stooges	Dave Alexander; Ron Asheton; Scott Asheton; Iggy Pop	Fun House	Don Gallucci	1970	
"Funtime"	Iggy Pop	Iggy Pop; David Bowie	The Idiot	David Bowie	1977	
"Furies"	Praxis featuring Iggy Pop	Bill Laswell; Iggy Pop	Profanation (Preparation for a Coming Darkness) (Praxis album)	Bill Laswell	2008	
"Gardenia"	Iggy Pop	Iggy Pop; Josh Homme; Dean Fertita	Post Pop Depression	Josh Homme	2016	
"German Days"	Iggy Pop	Iggy Pop; Josh Homme	Post Pop Depression	Josh Homme	2016	
"Get Up and Get Out"	Iggy Pop	Iggy Pop	Soldier	Pat Moran	1980	
"Get Your Shirt"	Underworld and Iggy Pop	Rick Smith; Karl Hyde; Iggy Pop	Teatime Dub Encounters	Rick Smith	2018	
"Gimme Danger"	Iggy and the Stooges	Iggy Pop; James Williamson	Raw Power	Iggy Pop	1973	
"Gimme Some Skin"	Iggy Pop and James Williamson	Iggy Pop; James Williamson	B-side of "I Got a Right"	James Williamson	1977	
"Girls"	Iggy Pop	Iggy Pop	New Values	James Williamson	1979	
"Girls of N.Y."	Iggy Pop	Iggy Pop	American Caesar	Malcolm Burn	1993	
"Glow in the Dark"	Iggy Pop	Leron Thomas †	Free	Leron Thomas	2019	
"Go for the Throat"	Iggy Pop	Iggy Pop; Lloyd "Mooseman" Roberts; Whitey Kirst; Alex Kirst	Beat 'Em Up	Iggy Pop	2001	
"Greedy Awful People"	The Stooges	Iggy Pop; Ron Asheton; Scott Asheton	The Weirdness	Steve Albini	2007	
"Gun"	Iggy and the Stooges	Iggy Pop; James Williamson	Ready to Die	James Williamson	2013	
"Happy Man"	Iggy Pop	Iggy Pop; Ivan Král	Party	Thom Panunzio	1981	
"Hate"	Iggy Pop	Iggy Pop	American Caesar	Malcolm Burn	1993	
"He's Dead / She's Alive"	Iggy Pop	Iggy Pop	Préliminaires	Hal Cragin	2009	
"Heart Is Saved"	Iggy Pop	Iggy Pop	Naughty Little Doggie	Iggy Pop; Thom Wilson	1996	
"Here Comes the Summer"	Iggy Pop featuring the Trolls	Iggy Pop; Whitey Kirst; Alex Kirst; Pete Marshall	Skull Ring	Iggy Pop	2003	
"Hideaway"	Iggy Pop	Iggy Pop; David Bowie	Blah-Blah-Blah	David Bowie; David Richards	1986	
"High on You"	Iggy Pop	Iggy Pop	Instinct	Bill Laswell	1988	
"Highway Song"	Iggy Pop	Iggy Pop	American Caesar	Malcolm Burn	1993	
"Hollywood Affair"	Iggy Pop featuring Johnny Depp	Iggy Pop; Johnny Depp	B-side of "Corruption"	Iggy Pop	1999	
"Home"	Iggy Pop	Iggy Pop	Brick by Brick	Don Was	1990	
"The Horse Song"	Iggy Pop	Iggy Pop; Rob Duprey	Zombie Birdhouse	Chris Stein	1982	
"Houston Is Hot Tonight"	Iggy Pop	Iggy Pop; Ivan Král	Party	Thom Panunzio	1981	
"How Do Ya Fix a Broken Part"	Iggy Pop	Iggy Pop	New Values	James Williamson	1979	
"How Insensitive" (Antônio Carlos Jobim cover)	Iggy Pop	Vinicius De Moraes; Ray Gilbert; Antônio Carlos Jobim †	Préliminaires	Hal Cragin	2009	
"Howl"	Iggy Pop	Iggy Pop; Whitey Kirst	Beat 'Em Up	Iggy Pop	2001	
"I Don't Know Why"	The Iguanas	Nick Kolokithas †	B-side of "Mona"	–	1966	
"I Feel Fine" (The Beatles cover)	The Iguanas	John Lennon; Paul McCartney †	The Iguanas	–	1996	
"I Felt the Luxury"	Iggy Pop featuring Medeski Martin & Wood	Iggy Pop; William Martin; John Medeski; Christopher Wood	Avenue B	Don Was	1999	
"I Got a Right"	Iggy Pop and James Williamson	Iggy Pop; James Williamson	Non-album single	James Williamson	1977	
"I Got Nothin'"	Iggy Pop and James Williamson	Iggy Pop; James Williamson	Kill City	James Williamson	1977	
"I Need More"	Iggy Pop	Iggy Pop; Glen Matlock	Soldier	Pat Moran	1980	
"I Need Somebody"	Iggy and the Stooges	Iggy Pop; James Williamson	Raw Power	Iggy Pop	1973	
"I Snub You"	Iggy Pop	Iggy Pop; Barry Andrews	Soldier	Pat Moran	1980	
"I Wanna Be Your Dog"	The Stooges	Dave Alexander; Ron Asheton; Scott Asheton; Iggy Pop	The Stooges	John Cale	1969	
"I Wanna Be Your Man" (The Rolling Stones cover)	The Stooges	John Lennon; Paul McCartney †	The Weirdness (Vinyl and iTunes editions only)	Steve Albini	2007	
"I Wanna Be Your Slave"	Måneskin & Iggy Pop	Damiano David; Victoria De Angelis; Thomas Raggi; Ethan Torchio †	Non-album single	Måneskin; Fabrizio Ferraguzzo	2021	
"I Wanna Live"	Iggy Pop	Iggy Pop; Whitey Kirst	Naughty Little Doggie	Iggy Pop; Thom Wilson	1996	
"I Want to Go to the Beach"	Iggy Pop	Iggy Pop	Préliminaires	Hal Cragin	2009	
"I Won't Crap Out"	Iggy Pop	Iggy Pop	Brick by Brick	Don Was	1990	
"If I Had a Hammer" (The Weavers cover)	The Iguanas	Pete Seeger; Lee Hays †	The Iguanas	–	1996	
"Iggy"	Catherine Graindorge featuring Iggy Pop	Iggy Pop	The Dictator	Catherine Graindorge	2022	
"In the Lobby"	Iggy Pop	Iggy Pop; Josh Homme	Post Pop Depression	Josh Homme	2016	
"Inferiority Complex"	Iggy Pop featuring the Trolls	Iggy Pop; Whitey Kirst; Alex Kirst; Pete Marshall	Skull Ring	Iggy Pop	2003	
"Innocent World"	Iggy Pop	Iggy Pop	Naughty Little Doggie	Iggy Pop; Thom Wilson	1996	
"Instinct"	Iggy Pop	Iggy Pop	Instinct	Bill Laswell	1988	
"Isolation"	Iggy Pop	Iggy Pop; David Bowie	Blah-Blah-Blah	David Bowie; David Richards	1986	
"It's All Shit"	Iggy Pop	Iggy Pop; Whitey Kirst	Beat 'Em Up	Iggy Pop	2001	
"It's Our Love"	Iggy Pop	Iggy Pop	American Caesar	Malcolm Burn	1993	
"I'll See Big"	Underworld and Iggy Pop	Rick Smith; Karl Hyde; Iggy Pop	Teatime Dub Encounters	Rick Smith	2018	
"I'm a Conservative"	Iggy Pop	Iggy Pop	Soldier	Pat Moran	1980	
"I'm Bored"	Iggy Pop	Iggy Pop	New Values	James Williamson	1979	
"I'm Fried"	The Stooges	Iggy Pop; Ron Asheton; Scott Asheton	The Weirdness	Steve Albini	2007	
"I'm Going Away Smiling" (Yoko Ono cover)	Iggy Pop	Yoko Ono †	Après	Hal Cragin	2012	
"I'm Sick of You"	Iggy and the Stooges	Iggy Pop; James Williamson	"I'm Sick of You" (EP)	James Williamson	1977	
"James Bond"	Iggy Pop	Leron Thomas †	Free	Leron Thomas	2019	
"Je sais que tu sais"	Iggy Pop	Iggy Pop; Hal Cragin; Lucie Aimé	Préliminaires	Hal Cragin	2009	
"Jealousy"	Iggy Pop	Iggy Pop	American Caesar	Malcolm Burn	1993	
"Jerk"	Iggy Pop	Iggy Pop; Whitey Kirst	Beat 'Em Up	Iggy Pop	2001	
"Job"	Iggy and the Stooges	Iggy Pop; James Williamson	Ready to Die	James Williamson	2013	
"Johanna"	Iggy Pop and James Williamson	Iggy Pop; James Williamson	Kill City	James Williamson	1977	
"Johnny B. Goode" (Chuck Berry cover)	The Iguanas	Chuck Berry †	The Iguanas	–	1996	
"Keep on Believing"	Iggy Pop	Iggy Pop; Eric Schermerhorn	Naughty Little Doggie	Iggy Pop; Thom Wilson	1996	
"Kick It"	Peaches featuring Iggy Pop	Peaches †	Fatherfucker (Peaches album)	Peaches	2003	
"Kick Me" (Danny Elfman remix)	Danny Elfman featuring Iggy Pop	Danny Elfman †	Bigger. Messier. (Danny Elfman remix album)	Danny Elfman	2022	
"Kill City"	Iggy Pop and James Williamson	Iggy Pop; James Williamson	Kill City	James Williamson	1977	
"King of the Dogs"	Iggy Pop	Iggy Pop; Lillian Armstrong	Préliminaires	Hal Cragin	2009	
"Knocking 'Em Down (In the City)"	Iggy Pop	Iggy Pop	Soldier	Pat Moran	1980	
"Knucklehead"	Iggy Pop	Iggy Pop	Naughty Little Doggie	Iggy Pop; Thom Wilson	1996	
"L.A. Blues"	The Stooges	Dave Alexander; Ron Asheton; Scott Asheton; Iggy Pop	Fun House	Don Gallucci	1970	
"La Javanaise" (Serge Gainsbourg cover)	Iggy Pop	Serge Gainsbourg †	Après	Hal Cragin	2012	
"La Vie en rose" (Édith Piaf cover)	Iggy Pop	Édith Piaf; Louis Guglielmi †	Après	Hal Cragin	2012	
"Les Amants"	Les Rita Mitsouko featuring Iggy Pop	Fred Chichin; Catherine Ringer †	B-side of "Beside You" (UK CD)	–	1993	
"Les feuilles mortes"	Iggy Pop	Jacques Prévert; Joseph Kosma †	Préliminaires	Hal Cragin	2009	
"Les feuilles mortes (Marc's Theme)"	Iggy Pop	Jacques Prévert; Joseph Kosma †	Préliminaires	Hal Cragin	2009	
"Les Passentes" (Georges Brassens cover)	Iggy Pop	Antoine Pol; Georges Brassens †	Après	Hal Cragin	2012	
"Life of Work"	Iggy Pop	Iggy Pop; Rob Duprey	Zombie Birdhouse	Chris Stein	1982	
"Little Doll"	The Stooges	Dave Alexander; Ron Asheton; Scott Asheton; Iggy Pop	The Stooges	John Cale	1969	
"Little Electric Chair"	Iggy Pop featuring the Stooges	Iggy Pop; Ron Asheton; Scott Asheton	Skull Ring	Iggy Pop	2003	
"Little Know It All"	Iggy Pop featuring Sum 41	Iggy Pop; Deryck Whibley; Greig Nori	Skull Ring	Iggy Pop; Greig Nori	2003	
"Little Miss Emperor"	Iggy Pop	Iggy Pop; David Bowie	Blah-Blah-Blah (CD and cassette)	David Bowie; David Richards	1986	
"Livin' on the Edge of the Night"	Iggy Pop	Jay Rifkin; Eric Rackin †	Brick by Brick	Don Was	1990	
"Loco Mosquito"	Iggy Pop	Iggy Pop	Soldier	Pat Moran	1980	
"Long Distance"	Iggy Pop	Iggy Pop	Avenue B	Don Was	1999	
"Look Away"	Iggy Pop	Iggy Pop	Naughty Little Doggie	Iggy Pop; Thom Wilson	1996	
"Loose"	The Stooges	Dave Alexander; Ron Asheton; Scott Asheton; Iggy Pop	Fun House	Don Gallucci	1970	
"Loser"	Iggy Pop featuring the Stooges	Iggy Pop; Ron Asheton; Scott Asheton	Skull Ring	Iggy Pop	2003	
"L.O.S.T."	Iggy Pop	Iggy Pop; Whitey Kirst	Beat 'Em Up	Iggy Pop	2001	
"Louie Louie" (Note: Also recorded by the Iguanas, which was released on The Iguanas in 1996.) (Richard Berry cover)	Iggy Pop	Richard Berry †	American Caesar	Malcolm Burn	1993	
"Loves Missing"	Iggy Pop	Iggy Pop; Leron Thomas	Free	Leron Thomas	2019	
"Low Life"	Iggy Pop	Iggy Pop; Ivan Král	Soldier (2000 reissue)	Thom Panunzio	2000	
"Lowdown"	Iggy Pop	Iggy Pop	Instinct	Bill Laswell	1988	
"Lucky Monkeys"	Iggy Pop and James Williamson	Iggy Pop; James Williamson	Kill City	James Williamson	1977	
"Lust for Life"	Iggy Pop	Iggy Pop; David Bowie	Lust for Life	David Bowie; Iggy Pop; Colin Thurston	1977	
"A Machine for Loving"	Iggy Pop	Iggy Pop; Hal Cragin; Michel Houellebecq; Gavin Bowd (Note: English translation)	Préliminaires	Hal Cragin	2009	
"Main Street Eyes"	Iggy Pop	Iggy Pop	Brick by Brick	Don Was	1990	
"Mask"	Iggy Pop	Iggy Pop; Lloyd "Mooseman" Roberts; Whitey Kirst; Alex Kirst	Beat 'Em Up	Iggy Pop	2001	
"Mass Production"	Iggy Pop	Iggy Pop; David Bowie	The Idiot	David Bowie	1977	
"Master Charge"	Iggy Pop and James Williamson	James Williamson; Scott Thurston †	Kill City	James Williamson	1977	
"Mexican Guy"	The Stooges	Iggy Pop; Ron Asheton; Scott Asheton	The Weirdness	Steve Albini	2007	
"Michelle" (The Beatles cover)	Iggy Pop	John Lennon; Paul McCartney †	Après	Hal Cragin	2012	
"Miss Argentina"	Iggy Pop	Iggy Pop	Avenue B	Don Was	1999	
"Mixin' the Colors"	Iggy Pop	Iggy Pop	American Caesar	Malcolm Burn	1993	
"Modern Day Ripoff"	Iggy Pop	Iggy Pop; Andrew Watt; Duff McKagan; Chad Smith	Every Loser	Andrew Watt	2023	
"Mom & Dad"	Lavinia Meijer featuring Iggy Pop	Lavinia Meijer; Iggy Pop (lyrics)	Are You Still Somewhere (Lavinia Meijer album)	Gijs Van Klooster	2022	
"Mona" (Bo Diddley cover)	The Iguanas	Ellas McDaniel †	Non-album single	–	1966	
"Moonlight Lady"	Iggy Pop	Iggy Pop	Brick by Brick	Don Was	1990	
"Morning Show"	Iggy Pop	Iggy Pop; Andrew Watt	Every Loser	Andrew Watt	2023	
"Motor Inn"	Iggy Pop & Feedom featuring Peaches	Iggy Pop; Merrill Nisker; Jason Beck; Dave Szgeti	Skull Ring	Iggy Pop	2003	
"Motorcycle"	Iggy Pop	Iggy Pop	Avenue B	Don Was	1999	
"Mr. Dynamite"	Iggy Pop	Iggy Pop; Glen Matlock	Soldier	Pat Moran	1980	
"Mud I"	Catherine Graindorge featuring Iggy Pop	Iggy Pop	The Dictator	Catherine Graindorge	2022	
"Mud II"	Catherine Graindorge featuring Iggy Pop	Iggy Pop	The Dictator	Catherine Graindorge	2022	
"My Angel"	Iggy Pop	Iggy Pop	B-side of "Wild America"	Malcolm Burn	1993	
"My Animus" (interlude)	Iggy Pop	Iggy Pop; Andrew Watt	Every Loser	Andrew Watt	2023	
"My Baby Wants to Rock & Roll"	Iggy Pop	Iggy Pop; Slash	Brick by Brick	Don Was	1990	
"My Idea of Fun"	The Stooges	Iggy Pop; Ron Asheton; Scott Asheton	The Weirdness	Steve Albini	2007	
"My Love is Bad"	Les Rita Mitsouko featuring Iggy Pop	Fred Chichin; Catherine Ringer †	Système D (Les Rita Mitsouko album)	Les Rita Mitsouko	1993	
"Nazi Girlfriend"	Iggy Pop	Iggy Pop	Avenue B	Don Was	1999	
"Neighborhood Threat"	Iggy Pop	Iggy Pop; David Bowie; Ricky Gardiner	Lust for Life	David Bowie; Iggy Pop; Colin Thurston	1977	
"Neo Punk"	Iggy Pop	Iggy Pop; Andrew Watt; Josh Klinghoffer; Travis Barker	Every Loser	Andrew Watt	2023	
"Neon Forest"	Iggy Pop	Iggy Pop	Brick by Brick	Don Was	1990	
"Nervous Exhaustion" (hidden track)	Iggy Pop featuring the Trolls	Iggy Pop; Whitey Kirst; Alex Kirst; Pete Marshall	Skull Ring	Iggy Pop	2003	
"New Atlantis"	Iggy Pop	Iggy Pop; Andrew Watt; Duff McKagan; Chad Smith	Every Loser	Andrew Watt	2023	
"New Values"	Iggy Pop	Iggy Pop; Scott Thurston	New Values	James Williamson	1979	
"The News for Andy" (interlude)	Iggy Pop	Iggy Pop; Andrew Watt	Every Loser	Andrew Watt	2023	
"Nice to be Dead"	Iggy Pop	Iggy Pop; Hal Cragin	Préliminaires	Hal Cragin	2009	
"Night Theme"	Iggy Pop and James Williamson	Iggy Pop; James Williamson	Kill City	James Williamson	1977	
"Night Theme (Reprise)"	Iggy Pop and James Williamson	Iggy Pop; James Williamson	Kill City	James Williamson	1977	
"Nightclubbing"	Iggy Pop	Iggy Pop; David Bowie	The Idiot	David Bowie	1977	
"No Fun"	The Stooges	Dave Alexander; Ron Asheton; Scott Asheton; Iggy Pop	The Stooges	John Cale	1969	
"No Sense of Crime"	Iggy Pop and James Williamson	Iggy Pop; James Williamson	Kill City	James Williamson	1977	
"No Shit"	Iggy Pop	Iggy Pop	Avenue B	Don Was	1999	
"Not Right"	The Stooges	Dave Alexander; Ron Asheton; Scott Asheton; Iggy Pop	The Stooges	John Cale	1969	
"O Solo Mio"	The Stooges	Iggy Pop; Ron Asheton; Scott Asheton	The Weirdness (Vinyl and Japanese editions only)	Steve Albini	2007	
"One for My Baby (and One More for the Road)"	Iggy Pop	Harold Arlen; Johnny Mercer †	Party (2000 reissue)	Thom Panunzio	2000	
"Only the Lonely" (Frank Sinatra cover)	Iggy Pop	Sammy Cahn; Jimmy Van Heusen †	Après	Hal Cragin	2012	
"Ordinary Bummer"	Iggy Pop	Iggy Pop	Zombie Birdhouse	Chris Stein	1982	
"Out of Limits" (The Marketts cover)	The Iguanas	Michael Z. Gordon †	The Iguanas	–	1996	
"Outta My Head"	Iggy Pop	Iggy Pop	Naughty Little Doggie	Iggy Pop; Thom Wilson	1996	
"Page"	Iggy Pop	Leron Thomas †	Free	Leron Thomas	2019	
"Pain and Suffering"	Iggy Pop	Iggy Pop; Rob Duprey	Zombie Birdhouse (1991 reissue)	Chris Stein	1991	
"Paraguay"	Iggy Pop	Iggy Pop; Josh Homme	Post Pop Depression	Josh Homme	2016	
"Party Time"	Iggy Pop	Iggy Pop; Hal Cragin	Préliminaires	Hal Cragin	2009	
"The Passenger"	Iggy Pop	Iggy Pop; Ricky Gardiner	Lust for Life	David Bowie; Iggy Pop; Colin Thurston	1977	
"Passing Cloud"	The Stooges	Iggy Pop; Ron Asheton; Scott Asheton	The Weirdness	Steve Albini	2007	
"Penetration"	Iggy and the Stooges	Iggy Pop; James Williamson	Raw Power	Iggy Pop	1973	
"Perforation Problems"	Iggy Pop	Iggy Pop	American Caesar	Malcolm Burn	1993	
"Perverts in the Sun"	Iggy Pop featuring the Trolls	Iggy Pop; Whitey Kirst; Alex Kirst; Pete Marshall	Skull Ring	Iggy Pop	2003	
"Pipeline" (Chantay's cover)	The Iguanas	Brian Carman; Bob Spickard †	The Iguanas	–	1996	
"Plastic & Concrete"	Iggy Pop	Iggy Pop	American Caesar	Malcolm Burn	1993	
"Platonic"	Iggy Pop	Iggy Pop; Rob Duprey	Zombie Birdhouse	Chris Stein	1982	
"Play It Safe"	Iggy Pop	Iggy Pop; David Bowie	Soldier	Pat Moran	1980	
"Pleasure"	Iggy Pop	Iggy Pop; Ivan Král	Party	Thom Panunzio	1981	
"Power & Freedom"	Iggy Pop	Iggy Pop; Steve Jones	Instinct	Bill Laswell	1988	
"Pretty Flamingo"	Iggy Pop	Iggy Pop	B-side of "Five Foot One"	James Williamson	1979	
"Private Hell"	Iggy Pop featuring Green Day	Iggy Pop; Billie Joe Armstrong	Skull Ring	Iggy Pop	2003	
"Pumpin' for Jill"	Iggy Pop	Iggy Pop; Ivan Král	Party	Thom Panunzio	1981	
"Punkrocker"	Teddybears featuring Iggy Pop	Patrik Arve; Joakim Åhlund; Klas Åhlund †	Soft Machine (Teddybears album)	Teddybears	2006	
"Pussy Power"	Iggy Pop	Iggy Pop	Brick by Brick	Don Was	1990	
"Pussy Walk"	Iggy Pop	Iggy Pop; Eric Schermerhorn	Naughty Little Doggie	Iggy Pop; Thom Wilson	1996	
"Raw Power"	Iggy and the Stooges	Iggy Pop; James Williamson	Raw Power	Iggy Pop	1973	
"Real Cool Time"	The Stooges	Dave Alexander; Ron Asheton; Scott Asheton; Iggy Pop	The Stooges	John Cale	1969	
"Real Wild Child (Wild One)" (Johnny O'Keefe cover)	Iggy Pop	Johnny O'Keefe; Johnny Greenan; Dave Owens †	Blah-Blah-Blah	David Bowie; David Richards	1986	
"Ready to Die"	Iggy and the Stooges	Iggy Pop; James Williamson	Ready to Die	James Williamson	2013	
"The Regency"	Iggy Pop	Iggy Pop; Andrew Watt; Dave Navarro; Chris Chaney; Taylor Hawkins	Every Loser	Andrew Watt	2023	
"Rock and Roll Party"	Iggy Pop	Iggy Pop; Ivan Král	Party	Thom Panunzio	1981	
"Rock Show" (Peaches cover)/	Iggy Pop featuring Peaches	Merrill Nisker †	Skull Ring	Iggy Pop	2003	
"Rock Star Grave"	Iggy Pop	Iggy Pop	B-side of "Corruption"	Don Was	1999	
"Run Like a Villain"	Iggy Pop	Iggy Pop; Rob Duprey	Zombie Birdhouse	Chris Stein	1982	
"Savior"	Iggy Pop	Iggy Pop; Whitey Kirst	Beat 'Em Up	Iggy Pop	2001	
"Scene of the Crime"	Iggy and the Stooges	Iggy Pop; James Williamson	"I'm Sick of You" (EP)	James Williamson	1977	
"Sea of Love" (Phil Phillips cover)	Iggy Pop	George Khoury; Phil Phillips †	Party	Tommy Boyce	1981	
"Search and Destroy"	Iggy and the Stooges	Iggy Pop; James Williamson	Raw Power	Iggy Pop	1973	
"Sell Your Love"	Iggy Pop and James Williamson	Iggy Pop; James Williamson	Kill City	James Williamson	1977	
"Sex & Money"	Iggy and the Stooges	Iggy Pop; James Williamson	Ready to Die	James Williamson	2013	
"Shades"	Iggy Pop	Iggy Pop; David Bowie	Blah-Blah-Blah	David Bowie; David Richards	1986	
"Shake Appeal"	Iggy and the Stooges	Iggy Pop; James Williamson	Raw Power	Iggy Pop	1973	
"Shakin' All Over" (Johnny Kidd & the Pirates cover)	Iggy Pop	Johnny Kidd †	Avenue B	Don Was	1999	
"She Called Me Daddy"	Iggy Pop	Iggy Pop	Avenue B	Don Was	1999	
"She Took My Money"	The Stooges	Iggy Pop; Ron Asheton; Scott Asheton	The Weirdness	Steve Albini	2007	
"She's a Business"	Iggy Pop	Iggy Pop; Hal Cragin	Préliminaires	Hal Cragin	2009	
"Shoeshine Girl"	Iggy Pop	Iggy Pop; Eric Schermerhorn	Naughty Little Doggie	Iggy Pop; Thom Wilson	1996	
"Sickness"	Iggy Pop	Iggy Pop	American Caesar	Malcolm Burn	1993	
"Sincerity"	Iggy Pop	Iggy Pop; Ivan Král	Party	Thom Panunzio	1981	
"Sister Midnight"	Iggy Pop	Iggy Pop; David Bowie; Carlos Alomar	The Idiot	David Bowie	1977	
"Sixteen"	Iggy Pop	Iggy Pop	Lust for Life	David Bowie; Iggy Pop; Colin Thurston	1977	
"Skull Ring"	Iggy Pop featuring the Stooges	Iggy Pop; Ron Asheton; Scott Asheton	Skull Ring	Iggy Pop	2003	
"Slow Down" (Larry Williams cover)	The Iguanas	Larry Williams †	The Iguanas	–	1996	
"Social Life"	Iggy Pop	Iggy Pop	American Caesar	Malcolm Burn	1993	
"Some Weird Sin"	Iggy Pop	Iggy Pop; David Bowie	Lust for Life	David Bowie; Iggy Pop; Colin Thurston	1977	
"Something Wild"	Iggy Pop	John Hiatt †	Brick by Brick	Don Was	1990	
"Sonali"	Iggy Pop	Ruby Sylvain; Leron Thomas †	Free	Leron Thomas	2019	
"Sounds of Leather"	The Stooges	Iggy Pop; Ron Asheton; Scott Asheton	The Weirdness (Vinyl-edition only)	Steve Albini	2007	
"Spanish Coast"	Iggy Pop	Iggy Pop; Hal Cragin	Préliminaires	Hal Cragin	2009	
"Speak to Me"	Iggy Pop	Iggy Pop; Ivan Král	Party (2000 reissue)	Thom Panunzio	2000	
"Squarehead"	Iggy Pop	Iggy Pop; Steve Jones	Instinct	Bill Laswell	1988	
"Starry Night"	Iggy Pop	Iggy Pop	Brick by Brick	Don Was	1990	
"Street Crazies"	Iggy Pop	Iggy Pop	Zombie Birdhouse	Chris Stein	1982	
"Strong Girl"	Iggy Pop	Iggy Pop; Steve Jones	Instinct	Bill Laswell	1988	
"Strung Out Johnny"	Iggy Pop	Iggy Pop; Andrew Watt; Josh Klinghoffer; Chad Smith	Every Loser	Andrew Watt	2023	
"Suberbabe"	Iggy Pop featuring the Trolls	Iggy Pop; Whitey Kirst; Alex Kirst; Pete Marshall	Skull Ring	Iggy Pop	2003	
"Success"	Iggy Pop	Iggy Pop; David Bowie; Ricky Gardiner	Lust for Life	David Bowie; Iggy Pop; Colin Thurston	1977	
"Sunday"	Iggy Pop	Iggy Pop; Josh Homme; Dean Fertita	Post Pop Depression	Josh Homme	2016	
"Sunshine Superman" (Donovan cover)	Dr. Lonnie Smith featuring Iggy Pop	Donovan †	Breathe (Dr. Lonnie Smith album)	Don Was	2021	
"Supermarket"	Iggy Pop featuring Green Day	Iggy Pop; Billie Joe Armstrong	Skull Ring	Iggy Pop	2003	
"Surfin' Bird" (The Trashmen cover)	The Iguanas	Al Frazier; Carl White; Sonny Harris; Turner Wilson Jr. †	The Iguanas	–	1996	
"Syracuse" (Henri Salvador cover)	Iggy Pop	Bernard Dimey; Henri Salvador †	Après	Hal Cragin	2012	
"Take Care of Me"	Iggy Pop	Iggy Pop; Glen Matlock	Soldier	Pat Moran	1980	
"Talking Snake"	Iggy Pop	Iggy Pop; Whitey Kirst	Beat 'Em Up	Iggy Pop	2001	
"Tell Me" (The Rolling Stones cover)	The Iguanas	Mick Jagger; Keith Richards †	The Iguanas	–	1996	
"Tell Me a Story"	Iggy Pop	Iggy Pop	New Values	James Williamson	1979	
"Tequila" (The Champs cover)	The Iguanas	Chuck Rio †	The Iguanas	–	1996	
"Things We Said Today" (The Beatles cover)	The Iguanas	John Lennon; Paul McCartney †	The Iguanas	–	1996	
"Tight Pants"	Iggy and the Stooges	Iggy Pop; James Williamson	"I'm Sick of You" (EP)	James Williamson	1977	
"'Til Wrong Feels Right"	Iggy Pop	Iggy Pop	Skull Ring	Iggy Pop	2003	
"Time Won't Let Me" (The Outsiders cover)	Iggy Pop	Tom King; Chet Kelly †	Party	Tommy Boyce	1981	
"Tiny Girls"	Iggy Pop	Iggy Pop; David Bowie	The Idiot	David Bowie	1977	
"To Belong"	Iggy Pop	Iggy Pop	Naughty Little Doggie	Iggy Pop; Thom Wilson	1996	
"Tom Tom"	Iggy Pop	Iggy Pop	Instinct	Bill Laswell	1988	
"Tonight"	Iggy Pop	Iggy Pop; David Bowie	Lust for Life	David Bowie; Iggy Pop; Colin Thurston	1977	
"Trapped"	Underworld and Iggy Pop	Rick Smith; Karl Hyde; Iggy Pop	Teatime Dub Encounters	Rick Smith	2018	
"Trollin'"	The Stooges	Iggy Pop; Ron Asheton; Scott Asheton	The Weirdness	Steve Albini	2007	
"Tuff Baby"	Iggy Pop	Iggy Pop	Instinct	Bill Laswell	1988	
"Turn Blue"	Iggy Pop	Iggy Pop; David Bowie; Warren Peace	Lust for Life	David Bowie; Iggy Pop; Colin Thurston	1977	
"T.V. Eye"	The Stooges	Dave Alexander; Ron Asheton; Scott Asheton; Iggy Pop	Fun House	Don Gallucci	1970	
"Twist and Shout" (The Top Notes cover)	The Iguanas	Bert Russell; Phil Medley †	The Iguanas	–	1996	
"Ugliness"	Iggy Pop	Iggy Pop; Whitey Kirst	Beat 'Em Up	Iggy Pop	2001	
"The Undefeated"	Iggy Pop	Iggy Pop	Brick by Brick	Don Was	1990	
"Unfriendly World"	Iggy and the Stooges	Iggy Pop; James Williamson	Ready to Die	James Williamson	2013	
"The Villagers"	Iggy Pop	Iggy Pop; Rob Duprey	Zombie Birdhouse	Chris Stein	1982	
"V.I.P." (Note: Includes a hidden track called "Sterility")	Iggy Pop	Iggy Pop; Lloyd "Mooseman" Roberts; Whitey Kirst; Alex Kirst	Beat 'Em Up	Iggy Pop	2001	
"Vulture"	Iggy Pop	Iggy Pop; Josh Homme; Dean Fertita	Post Pop Depression	Josh Homme	2016	
"Walk Don't Run" (The Ventures cover)	The Iguanas	Johnny Smith †	The Iguanas	–	1996	
"Watching the News"	Iggy Pop	Iggy Pop; Rob Duprey	Zombie Birdhouse	Chris Stein	1982	
"We Are the People"	Iggy Pop	Lou Reed; Leron Thomas †	Free	Leron Thomas	2019	
"We Will Fall"	The Stooges	Dave Alexander; Ron Asheton; Scott Asheton; Iggy Pop	The Stooges	John Cale	1969	
"Weasels"	Iggy Pop	Iggy Pop; Whitey Kirst	Beat 'Em Up	Iggy Pop	2001	
"The Weirdness"	The Stooges	Iggy Pop; Ron Asheton; Scott Asheton	The Weirdness	Steve Albini	2007	
"Well, Did You Evah!" (Originally by Betty Grable and Charles Walters)	Iggy Pop & Debbie Harry	Cole Porter †	Red Hot + Blue	Chris Stein; Steve Lillywhite	1990	
"What Is This Thing Called Love?" (Cole Porter cover)	Iggy Pop	Cole Porter †	Après	Hal Cragin	2012	
"Whatever"	Iggy Pop featuring the Trolls	Iggy Pop; Whitey Kirst; Alex Kirst; Pete Marshall	Skull Ring	Iggy Pop	2003	
"Why Can't We Live Together" (Timmy Thomas cover)	Dr. Lonnie Smith featuring Iggy Pop	Timothy Thomas †	Breathe (Dr. Lonnie Smith album)	Don Was	2021	
"Wild America"	Iggy Pop	Iggy Pop; Eric Schermerhorn	American Caesar	Malcolm Burn	1993	
"Wild Weekend" (The Rockin' Rebels cover)	The Iguanas	Phil Todaro; Tom Shannon †	The Iguanas	–	1996	
"Winners & Losers"	Iggy Pop	Iggy Pop; Steve Jones	Blah-Blah-Blah	David Bowie; David Richards	1986	
"You Can't Have Friends"	The Stooges	Iggy Pop; Ron Asheton; Scott Asheton	The Weirdness	Steve Albini	2007	
"Your Pretty Face Is Going to Hell" (originally "Hard to Beat")	Iggy and the Stooges	Iggy Pop; James Williamson	Raw Power	Iggy Pop	1973	
