= A Million in Prizes: The Anthology =

Greatest hits album by Iggy Pop
- Released: July 19, 2005
- Recorded: 1969–2003
- Genre: Punk rock; rock and roll; hard rock
- Length: 2:34:46
- Label: Virgin
- Producer: various

Iggy Pop chronology
Skull Ring (2003)	A Million in Prizes: The Anthology (2005)	Préliminaires (2009)

Professional ratings
Review scores
Source	Rating
AllMusic	4.5/5 stars
Encyclopedia of Popular Music	4/5 stars
Pitchfork	7.9/10

A Million in Prizes: The Anthology is a 2-disc greatest hits collection of the music of Iggy Pop, released in 2005. It supersedes the compilation Nude & Rude: The Best of Iggy Pop. The title comes from the lyrics of "Lust for Life". It contains previously unreleased live versions of "TV Eye" and "Loose", recorded during the tour in 1993.

As of 2014 it has sold 39,099 copies in United States according to Nielsen SoundScan.

== Track listing ==
=== Disc one ===
The Stooges
No.	Title	Writer(s)	Original album	Length
1.	"1969"	Iggy Pop, Dave Alexander, Ron Asheton, Scott Asheton	The Stooges (1969)	4:05
2.	"No Fun"	Iggy Pop, Dave Alexander, Ron Asheton, Scott Asheton	The Stooges (1969)	5:15
3.	"I Wanna Be Your Dog"	Iggy Pop, Dave Alexander, Ron Asheton, Scott Asheton	The Stooges (1969)	3:09
4.	"Down on the Street"	Iggy Pop, Dave Alexander, Ron Asheton, Scott Asheton	Fun House (1970)	3:43

Iggy & The Stooges
No.	Title	Writer(s)	Original album	Length
5.	"I Got a Right"	Iggy Pop, James Williamson	"I Got a Right" (single) (1977)	3:22
6.	"Gimme Some Skin"	Iggy Pop, James Williamson	"I Got a Right" (single) (1977)	2:44
7.	"I'm Sick of You"	Iggy Pop, James Williamson	"I'm Sick of You" EP, 1977	6:52
8.	"Search and Destroy"	Iggy Pop, James Williamson	Raw Power (1973)	3:29
9.	"Gimme Danger"	Iggy Pop, James Williamson	Raw Power (1973)	3:33
10.	"Raw Power"	Iggy Pop, James Williamson	Raw Power (1973)	4:16

Solo
No.	Title	Writer(s)	Original album	Length
11.	"Kill City" (featuring James Williamson)	Iggy Pop, James Williamson	Kill City (1977)	2:29
12.	"Nightclubbing"	Iggy Pop, David Bowie	The Idiot (1977)	4:15
13.	"Funtime"	Iggy Pop, David Bowie	The Idiot (1977)	2:54
14.	"China Girl"	Iggy Pop, David Bowie	The Idiot (1977)	5:08
15.	"Sister Midnight"	Iggy Pop, David Bowie, Carlos Alomar	The Idiot (1977)	4:20
16.	"Tonight"	Iggy Pop, David Bowie	Lust for Life (1977)	3:38
17.	"Success"	David Bowie, James Osterberg, Ricky Gardiner	Lust for Life (1977)	4:24
18.	"Lust for Life"	Iggy Pop	Lust for Life (1977)	5:12
19.	"The Passenger"	Iggy Pop, Ricky Gardiner	Lust for Life (1977)	4:40

=== Disc two ===
No.	Title	Writer(s)	Originally from	Length
1.	"Some Weird Sin"	Iggy Pop, David Bowie	Lust for Life (1977)	3:40
2.	"I'm Bored"	Iggy Pop	New Values (1979)	2:46
3.	"I Need More"	Iggy Pop, Glen Matlock	Soldier (1980)	4:03
4.	"Pleasure"	Iggy Pop, Ivan Kral	Party (1981)	3:13
5.	"Run Like a Villain"	Iggy Pop, Robert Duprey	Zombie Birdhouse (1982)	3:01
6.	"Cry for Love"	Iggy Pop	Blah Blah Blah (1986)	4:26
7.	"Real Wild Child (Wild One)"	Johnny O'Keefe, Johnny Greenan, Dave Owens	Blah Blah Blah (1986)	3:39
8.	"Cold Metal"	Iggy Pop	Instinct (1988)	3:27
9.	"Home"	Iggy Pop	Brick by Brick (1990)	4:01
10.	"Candy" (with Kate Pierson of the B-52's)	Iggy Pop	Brick by Brick (1990)	4:14
11.	"Well, Did You Evah!" (with Deborah Harry of Blondie)	Cole Porter	Red Hot + Blue (1990)	3:28
12.	"Wild America"	Iggy Pop, Eric Schermerhorn	American Caesar (1993)	5:45
13.	"TV Eye" (Live)	Iggy Pop, Dave Alexander, Ron Asheton, Scott Asheton	Live at the Feile Festival (1993)	5:28
14.	"Loose" (Live)	Iggy Pop, Dave Alexander, Ron Asheton, Scott Asheton	Live at the Feile Festival (1993)	3:20
15.	"Look Away"	Iggy Pop	Naughty Little Doggie (1996)	5:09
16.	"Corruption"	Iggy Pop, Hal Cragin, Whitey Kirst	Avenue B (1999)	4:24
17.	"I Felt the Luxury" (with Medeski Martin & Wood)	Iggy Pop, Chris Wood, John Medeski, William Martin	Avenue B (1999)	6:30
18.	"Mask"	Iggy Pop, Alex Kirst, Mooseman, Whitey Kirst	Beat 'Em Up (2001)	2:54
19.	"Skull Ring"	Iggy Pop, Ron Asheton, Scott Asheton	Skull Ring (2003)	3:50

== Personnel ==
- Kevin Flaherty – compilation producer
- Evren Göknar – mastering engineer

== Charts ==
Chart performance for A Million in Prizes: The Anthology
Chart (2005)	Peak position
Belgian Albums (Ultratop Flanders)	21
Belgian Albums (Ultratop Wallonia)	50
Swiss Albums (Schweizer Hitparade)	51
UK Albums (OCC)	148

== Certifications ==
Certifications for A Million in Prizes: The Anthology
Region	Certification	Certified units/sales
United Kingdom (BPI)	Silver	60,000^{‡}
^{‡} Sales+streaming figures based on certification alone.
