= Nude & Rude: The Best of Iggy Pop =

Compilation album by Iggy Pop
- Released: October 29, 1996
- Recorded: 1969–1993
- Genre: Punk rock, hard rock, proto-punk
- Length: 73:00
- Label: Virgin
- Producer: various

Iggy Pop chronology
Naughty Little Doggie (1995)	Nude & Rude: The Best of Iggy Pop (1996)	Avenue B (1999)

Professional ratings
Review scores
Source	Rating
AllMusic	4.5/5 stars
Encyclopedia of Popular Music	4/5 stars

Nude & Rude: The Best of Iggy Pop is a compilation album by Iggy Pop. It was released in 1996 on Virgin Records. The album was superseded by A Million in Prizes: The Anthology.

== Track listing ==
The Stooges
No.	Title	Writer(s)	Original album	Length
1.	"I Wanna Be Your Dog"	Dave Alexander, Ron Asheton, Scott Asheton, Iggy Pop	The Stooges, 1969	3:10
2.	"No Fun"	Alexander, R. Asheton, S. Asheton, Pop	The Stooges	5:15

Iggy & The Stooges
No.	Title	Writer(s)	Original album	Length
3.	"Search and Destroy"	Pop, James Williamson	Raw Power, 1973	3:26
4.	"Gimme Danger"	Pop, Williamson	Raw Power	3:22
5.	"I'm Sick of You"	Pop, Williamson	I'm Sick of You EP, 1977	6:49

Solo
No.	Title	Writer(s)	Original album	Length
6.	"Funtime"	Pop, David Bowie	The Idiot, 1977	2:54
7.	"Nightclubbing"	Pop, Bowie	The Idiot	4:15
8.	"China Girl"	Pop, Bowie	The Idiot	5:07
9.	"Lust for Life"	Pop, Bowie	Lust for Life, 1977	5:10
10.	"The Passenger"	Pop, Ricky Gardiner	Lust for Life	4:41
11.	"Kill City" (featuring James Williamson)	Pop, Williamson	Kill City, 1977; originally recorded in 1975	2:22
12.	"Real Wild Child (Wild One)"	Johnny O'Keefe, Johnny Greenan, Dave Owens	Blah Blah Blah, 1986	3:38
13.	"Cry for Love"	Pop, Steve Jones	Blah Blah Blah	4:29
14.	"Cold Metal"	Pop	Instinct, 1988	3:27
15.	"Candy" (featuring Kate Pierson of The B-52's)	Pop	Brick by Brick, 1990	4:13
16.	"Home"	Pop	Brick by Brick	4:00
17.	"Wild America"	Pop, Eric Schermerhorn	American Caesar, 1993	5:52

== Charts ==
Chart performance for Nude & Rude: The Best of Iggy Pop
Chart (1996)	Peak position
UK Albums (OCC)	99

== Certifications ==
Certifications for Nude & Rude: The Best of Iggy Pop
Region	Certification	Certified units/sales
United Kingdom (BPI)	Silver	60,000^{*}
^{*} Sales figures based on certification alone.
