= Après (disambiguation) =

Après (English: After) may refer to:

- Après, a 2012 album by Iggy Pop
- "Après toi", a song by Vicky Leandros which won the 1972 Eurovision Song Contest
- Après Match, an Irish television comedy show
- Alternative pour un programme républicain, écologiste et socialiste (APRES), a French political party which became the Republican and Socialist Left in 2018
