= The Trolls =

American musical group (2001–2004)

- Origin: United States
- Years active: 2001–2004
- Label: Virgin Records
- Past members: Iggy Pop; Whitey Kirst; Alex Kirst; Pete Marshall; Mooseman

The Trolls were a short-lived American rock band formed by Iggy Pop, the members of which also consisted by Whitey Kirst (guitar), Alex Kirst (drums), Pete Marshall (guitar), and Mooseman (bass).

The band was first labeled on Iggy Pop's album Beat 'Em Up in 2001, and they also appeared on seven tracks on Pop's following album Skull Ring in 2003. They dissolved after the latter album.

Bassist Mooseman died in a drive-by shooting on February 22, 2001, in Los Angeles, California, four months before the release of Beat 'Em Up.

Drummer Alex Kirst was killed in a hit-and run near his home in Cathedral City, California, on January 13, 2011.

== Discography ==
=== As Iggy Pop ===
==== Albums ====
- Beat 'Em Up CD/LP (2001)
- Skull Ring CD/LP (2003)
