= Free (Iggy Pop album) =

Studio album by Iggy Pop
- Released: September 6, 2019
- Genre: Ambient; jazz
- Length: 33:44
- Label: Caroline; Loma Vista

Iggy Pop chronology
Teatime Dub Encounters (2018)	Free (2019)	Every Loser (2023)

Singles from Free
- 1. "Free" Released: July 18, 2019; 2. "James Bond" Released: August 14, 2019; 3. "Sonali" Released: August 28, 2019; 4. "Loves Missing" Released: October 12, 2019

Free is the eighteenth studio album by American rock singer Iggy Pop, released by Caroline International and Loma Vista Recordings on September 6, 2019. It features contributions from Noveller and Leron Thomas, and the title track was released along with the album announcement. A music video for the album's second single, "James Bond", was released on August 14, 2019.

== Background and recording ==
Iggy Pop described the album as "reflect[ing]" the exhaustion of post-tour life" as well as "uniquely somber and contemplative". He went on to say that after touring in support of Post Pop Depression, he felt "drained" and wanted to be "free", so the album "just kind of happened to me, and I let it happen". In an interview with Exclaim!, he elaborated: "I wanted to wiggle out of the frame of rock instrumentation that I'd gotten encased in over time. There's nothing wrong with it, but it wasn't what I felt at this time. I was interested in working with some fine musicians who broke out of the normal time and space." Pop also called it "an album in which other artists speak for me, but I lend my voice". The record has been referred to as a work of ambient music.

Pop first learned of Sarah Lipstate, who records under the name Noveller, and Leron Thomas while hosting his BBC Radio 6 Music show; he contacted them to express his appreciation, which eventually led to collaborations. In 2016, Pop invited Lipstate to open for him during the Post Pop Depression tour. Of Thomas, Pop said, "little by little, his stuff was knocking me out, and I really wanted to sing [on] his songs."

The track "We Are the People" features lyrics written by Lou Reed in 1970 but first published posthumously in 2018. The words "totally resonated" with Pop: "Like, 'wham', like 'pow'. It was the first poem in a book of lyrics and when I saw it, I thought, 'My God, this is the country today as I understand it, or at least one legitimate portrayal of the country today. It really spoke to me."

"Do Not Go Gentle into That Good Night" is a reading of the poem of the same name by Dylan Thomas. Pop had previously done a recording of the poem at the request of an advertising agency, who wanted it for a commercial; Pop provided a reading, but initially didn't think much of it. By the time of the recording of Free, Pop had grown to like it and decided to rerecord the poem and have Lipstate and Thomas improvise around it.

== Critical reception ==
Professional ratings
Aggregate scores
Source	Rating
Metacritic	73/100
Review scores
Source	Rating
AllMusic	4/5 stars
Consequence of Sound	B−
Chicago Tribune	2.5/5 stars
Exclaim!	8/10
The Independent	4/5 stars
NME	4/5 stars
The Observer	3/5 stars
Pitchfork	6.7/10
Rolling Stone	3.5/5 stars
The Skinny	2/5 stars

Free received generally positive reviews from critics. At Metacritic, which assigns a normalized rating out of 100 to reviews from critics, the album received an average score of 73, which indicates "generally favorable reviews", based on 18 reviews.

Adam White of The Independent describes Free as an album built on "unwieldy and uncertain jam sessions", marking a departure from Post Pop Pression that he predicted would polarise fans. He wrote that it showcases Pop "embracing the guises of poet and provocateur", and described the spoken word tracks as more intriguing than the traditional ones, adding that: "Free often feels like the messiest kind of improv, full of stream-of-consciousness expressions and storytelling that doesn't follow any particular logic." Mark Deming of AllMusic wrote that the album continued Pop's less aggressive, more pensive side from Préliminaires (2009) and Après (2012), prioritizing atmospheric keyboards and spectral trumpet. "As a detour from rock & roll," Deming wrote," Free is a fine and compelling study of the mind and mood of Iggy Pop at the age of 72, and if it's clearly the work of an older artist, that works to its favor, a pointed contrast to the abandon of his youth but with no less gravitas."

In Rolling Stone, Kory Grow wrote: "The only difference from this Iggy and the one who founded the Stooges is the album’s jazzy horns, synthy backdrops, and greater emphasis on Sinatra-style crooning. As luck would have it, the Iguana makes a convincing lounge lizard." Writing for Pitchfork, Stephen Thomas Erlewine also grouped the album with the "jazzy arthouse inspirations" Pop exhibied on Après and Préliminaires, adding that while this a departure from Post Pop Depression, it is "merely another iteration of the divide between Iggy Pop and Jim Osterberg: Homme brought out the rocker, while Free allows Osterberg to turn inward and meditate." He qualified that while the album's haziness and pensive soundscapes are alluring, he wished they were sometimes more sculpted, but added that "there's something curiously human and appealing about its ungainly nature."

In a reserved review, Max Sefton of The Skinny said the album would baffle "all but the most hardcore Iggy Pop fans", saying: "There's more fuzzed-up sax and a lugubrious pace, as if the septuagenarian star is happy playing about with whatever ideas pop into his head on a Miami evening."

== Live performance ==
Pop performed the entire album live for the first time on October 10, 2019, at La Gaîté Lyrique in Paris as part of the Arte Concert Festival 2019. He ended the concert performing four other songs: solo songs "Sister Midnight" and "The Endless Sea", "Chop Chop Chop" (a Sleaford Mods cover tentatively retitled "People! Places! Parties!") and "Death Trip" (an Iggy and the Stooges song).

== Track listing ==
Free track listing
No.	Title	Writer(s)	Length
1.	"Free"	Iggy Pop; Noveller	1:48
2.	"Loves Missing"	Pop; Leron Thomas	4:19
3.	"Sonali"	Ruby Sylvain; Thomas	3:30
4.	"James Bond"	Thomas	4:31
5.	"Dirty Sanchez"	Thomas	4:21
6.	"Glow in the Dark"	Thomas	3:57
7.	"Page"	Thomas	4:08
8.	"We Are the People"	Lou Reed (lyrics); Thomas	3:13
9.	"Do Not Go Gentle into That Good Night"	Dylan Thomas (lyrics); Noveller	1:48
10.	"The Dawn"	Pop; Noveller	2:09
Total length:			33:44

== Personnel ==
- Iggy Pop – vocals
- Leron Thomas – trumpet (all tracks except 10), keyboards (tracks 2, 7 and 8)
- Noveller – guitar "guitarscape" (tracks 1, 9 and 10)
- Kenny Ruby – bass (tracks 3, 5, 6), piano (track 3), synthetizer (tracks 5 and 6)
- Tibo Brandalise – drums (tracks 3, 5 and 6)
- Grégoire Fauque – guitar (tracks 5 and 6)
- Aaron Nevezie – guitar, bass (tracks 2 and 7), keyboards (track 7)
- Chris Berry – drums (track 2)
- Thomas Glass – drums (track 4)
- Robin Sherman – bass (track 4)
- Ari Teitel – guitar (track 4)
- Faith Vern – vocals (track 4)
- Florian Pellissier – keyboards (track 6)
- Rangeard Mickael – mixing and mastering

== Charts ==
=== Weekly charts ===
Weekly chart performance for Free
Chart (2019)	Peak position
Australian Albums (ARIA)	91
Belgian Albums (Ultratop Flanders)	10
Belgian Albums (Ultratop Wallonia)	7
Czech Albums (ČNS IFPI)	52
Dutch Albums (Album Top 100)	47
Finnish Albums (Suomen virallinen lista)	41
French Albums (SNEP)	18
German Albums (Offizielle Top 100)	13
Italian Albums (FIMI)	42
Japanese Albums (Oricon)	125
Polish Albums (ZPAV)	17
Scottish Albums (OCC)	9
Spanish Albums (Promusicae)	31
Swiss Albums (Schweizer Hitparade)	10
UK Albums (OCC)	26
US Indie Store Album Sales (Billboard)	8
US Vinyl Albums (Billboard)	20

=== Year-end charts ===
Year-end chart performance for Free
Chart (2019)	Position
Belgian Albums (Ultratop Wallonia)	183
