= Party (Iggy Pop album) =

Studio album by Iggy Pop
- Released: June 1981
- Recorded: August 1980
- Studio: Record Plant, New York City
- Genre: Dance-rock
- Length: 35:23
- Label: Arista
- Producer: Thom Panunzio; Tommy Boyce

Iggy Pop chronology
Soldier (1980)	Party (1981)	Zombie Birdhouse (1982)

Singles from Party
- 1. "Bang Bang / Sea of Love" Released: May 1981; 2. "Pumpin' for Jill / Time Won't Let Me" Released: 1981

Party is the fifth solo studio album by American rock singer Iggy Pop. It was released in June 1981 by record label Arista. For this record, Pop collaborated with Ivan Kral, who is best known as the guitar and bass player for Patti Smith in the 1970s.

== Recording ==
When Arista heard the album, they brought in former Monkees producer Tommy Boyce to remix "Bang Bang". According to Iggy Pop's autobiography I Need More, he wrote "Bang Bang" because Arista Records wanted a single and he promised them a commercial album. He originally wanted Phil Spector or Mike Chapman to produce the song. Iggy claimed he got the idea for the song from reading The Right Stuff at a local bookstore. "Eggs On Plate" was originally known as "Don't Put the Brakes On Tonight" and was originally written for Mick Ronson.

== Release ==
Party was released in June 1981. The album peaked at number 166 in the Billboard Top 200. "Bang Bang" was released as a single the same month, charting at number 35 on the Billboard Club Play Singles Chart.

Party is the last of Pop's three albums with Arista Records, following New Values and Soldier. Buddha reissued the album in 2000 with two bonus tracks: "Speak to Me" and a cool jazz rendition of the standard "One for My Baby (and One More for the Road)".

== Critical reception ==
Professional ratings
Review scores
Source	Rating
AllMusic	2/5 stars
Robert Christgau	C+
The Encyclopedia of Popular Music	2/5 stars
(The New) Rolling Stone Album Guide	2/5 stars
Spin Alternative Record Guide	4/10

Party has been poorly received by critics.

Charlotte Robinson of PopMatters called it "a bizarre train wreck of an album". Mark Deming of AllMusic wrote: "Part of Iggy Pop's unique sort of integrity is that the man doesn't seem to know how to sell out, even when he tries, and Party, one of the strangest albums of his career, is living proof."

== Tour ==
The Party tour was documented on the Live in San Fran 1981 CD (released in 1983) and DVD (released in 2005). This performance was filmed on November 25, 1981, at the Warfield Theatre on Market Street in San Francisco.

Tour personnel

- Iggy Pop – vocals
- Carlos Alomar – guitar
- Gary Valentine – guitar
- Rob Duprey – guitar
- Michael Page – bass guitar
- Clem Burke – drums

Absent from the tour was the album's guitarist and song co-writer Ivan Král.

== Track listing ==
All tracks are written by Iggy Pop and Ivan Král, except where noted.

Side 1
No.	Title	Length
1.	"Pleasure"	3:10
2.	"Rock and Roll Party"	4:11
3.	"Eggs on Plate"	3:41
4.	"Sincerity"	2:38
5.	"Houston Is Hot Tonight"	3:30

Side 2
No.	Title	Writer(s)	Length
1.	"Pumpin' for Jill"		4:30
2.	"Happy Man"		2:19
3.	"Bang Bang"		4:08
4.	"Sea of Love"	George Khoury, Phil Phillips	3:49
5.	"Time Won't Let Me"	Tom King, Chet Kelly	3:22

CD reissue bonus tracks
No.	Title	Writer(s)	Length
11.	"Speak to Me"		2:39
12.	"One for My Baby (and One More for the Road)"	Harold Arlen, Johnny Mercer	4:05

== Personnel ==
- Iggy Pop – vocals
- Ivan Kral – guitar, keyboards
- Rob Duprey – guitar
- Michael Page – bass
- Dougie Bowne – drums
- Jimmy Whizner – arrangements on "Sea of Love", "Bang Bang" and "Time Won't Let Me"
- Uptown Horns – on "Pleasure", "Sincerity", "Houston Is Hot Tonight" and "Happy Man"

== Charts ==
Chart performance for Party
Chart (1981)	Peak position
Australian Albums (Kent Music Report)	93
US Billboard 200	166

== Use in media ==
- The song "Pumpin' for Jill" was featured in the second-season episode Chuck Versus the Ex of Chuck.
