= Beat 'Em Up =

Beat Em Up

Studio album by Iggy Pop
- Released: July 17, 2001
- Studio: Hit Factory Criteria (Miami)
- Genre: Hard rock
- Length: 72:27
- Label: Virgin
- Producer: Iggy Pop

Iggy Pop chronology
Avenue B (1999)	Beat Em Up (2001)	Skull Ring (2003)

Singles from Beat Em Up
- 1. "Mask" Released: 2001; 2. "Football" Released: 2001

Beat Em Up is the thirteenth studio album by American rock singer Iggy Pop. Recorded at Hit Factory Criteria studios in Miami Beach, Florida, it is the first Iggy Pop album in which the Trolls were credited. The Trolls were: Iggy Pop, Whitey Kirst, Pete Marshall, Alex Kirst and Lloyd "Mooseman" Roberts.

== Background ==
Art Collins, Pop's manager, said of the album: "I'm not saying this is another Raw Power, but if Raw Power is a true Iggy album, then this is another true Iggy album". He added there would be some "ranting on the album, some humor, some rock on it." The album was self-produced.

== Release ==
Beat Em Up was released on July 17, 2001, and included as an unmentioned bonus the song acknowledged as "Sterility" on tour playlists, featured right after "VIP". The album was dedicated to Mooseman, who had been killed in a drive-by shooting after its recording.

== Reception and aftermath ==
=== Reception ===
Professional ratings
Aggregate scores
Source	Rating
Metacritic	58/100
Review scores
Source	Rating
AllMusic	2.5/5 stars
Blistering	5/5 stars
The Encyclopedia of Popular Music	3/5 stars
Pitchfork	2.5/10
The Rolling Stone Album Guide	2.5/5 stars

Pitchfork was largely dismissive of the record, proclaiming its content "third-rate bar band stuff".

=== Aftermath ===
"Mask" was included on the compilation A Million in Prizes: The Anthology. The murder by drive-by shooting of bassist Lloyd 'Mooseman' Roberts, a former member of Ice-T's Body Count and a member of the Trolls at the time of his death, postponed plans to tour, though "Mask" was performed to great effect on The Late Show with David Letterman.

== Track listing ==
All songs composed by Iggy Pop and Whitey Kirst, except where indicated. Track 15 (7:10 + 1:01 silence + 4:59) features a hidden track, "Sterility".

1. "Mask" (Iggy Pop, Lloyd "Mooseman" Roberts, Alex Kirst, Whitey Kirst) – 2:53
2. "L.O.S.T." – 3:24
3. "Howl" – 5:05
4. "Football" – 3:52
5. "Savior" – 4:37
6. "Beat Em Up" – 4:26
7. "Talking Snake" – 4:28
8. "Jerk" – 3:44
9. "Death is Certain" – 4:38
10. "Go for the Throat" (Pop, Mooseman, Kirst, Kirst) – 3:56
11. "Weasels" – 2:59
12. "Drink New Blood" – 4:33
13. "It's All Shit" – 4:57
14. "Ugliness" – 5:37
15. "V.I.P." (Pop, Mooseman, Kirst, Kirst) – 15:31

== B-sides and alternate versions ==
- "Mask" (Single edit) – 2:53

== Personnel ==
- Iggy Pop – vocals

The Trolls

- Whitey Kirst – guitar
- Pete Marshall – guitar
- Alex Kirst – drums
- Lloyd "Mooseman" Roberts – bass

with:

- Danny Kadar – theremin on "L.O.S.T.", mix engineer, mixing
- Pete Marshall – rhythm guitar on "Ugliness"
- Todd James – cover illustration

== Charts ==
Chart performance for Beat 'Em Up
Chart (2001)	Peak position
German Albums (Offizielle Top 100)	70
