= Zombie Birdhouse =

Studio album by Iggy Pop
- Released: September 1982
- Recorded: June 1982
- Studios: Blank Tape, New York City
- Genres: Art rock; punk rock; new wave; experimental
- Length: 42:08
- Label: Animal
- Producer: Chris Stein

Iggy Pop chronology
Party (1981)	Zombie Birdhouse (1982)	Blah-Blah-Blah (1986)

Singles from Zombie Birdhouse
- 1. "Run Like a Villain" Released: 1982

Zombie Birdhouse is the sixth solo studio album by American rock singer Iggy Pop. It was released in September 1982 by record label Animal.

== Recording ==
Zombie Birdhouse was recorded on 16-track in June 1982 at Blank Tape Studios in New York City. Chris Stein of Blondie produced the album.

== Musical style ==
Charlotte Robinson of PopMatters writes that "Zombie Birdhouse [...] has reached near-legendary status for its oddity", and that it is "full of droning synthesizers, Afro-style beats and pseudo-poetic, free-associative lyrics". Though the rear cover of the album states, "there are no synthesizers on this record." She also wrote that the album "marked the end of an intriguing and experimental if erratic period of Pop's career." Jeffrey Ramos of Minor Clash Publications called it Pop's final new wave-era album and "[o]ne of Pop's most obscure and experimental releases that was decades ahead of its time. Filled with a strong punk rock ethos, as Pop rambles through poetic verse over introspective and experimental beats." According to writer Ross Horton, the album exhibits "a kind of greasy, sweaty, sleazy rock 'n' roll fitted with a sharp electronic edge," with sporadic musical comparisons to Suicide, Throbbing Gristle and Talking Heads.

== Release ==
The album was released in September 1982 by Stein's record label Animal Records.

In 1991 the album was remastered by Mike Reese and included one bonus track, "Pain and Suffering", from the original Blank Tape Studio sessions. The track was used in the 1983 film Rock & Rule.

In 2003 the remaster was reissued as a double disc which included a concert recording from 28 October 1982 at the Masonic Temple Theater in Toronto, during Iggy's 1982 Breaking Point tour.

== Reception ==
Professional ratings
Review scores
Source	Rating
AllMusic	2/5 stars
Classic Pop	5/10
The Encyclopedia of Popular Music	2/5 stars
The Great Rock Discography	4/10
The Line of Best Fit	8/10
Rolling Stone	3.5/5 stars
The Rolling Stone Album Guide	2/5 stars
Sounds	3/5 stars
The Village Voice	B−

Zombie Birdhouse has received a mixed response from critics. Parke Puterbaugh of Rolling Stone called the album "a brainy, well-plotted collection with more depth than could have been expected from the author of 'I Wanna Be Your Dog'." Robert Christgau of The Village Voice, naming it Iggy's most experimental album to date, praised "music-meister" Rob Duprey's interesting stylistic continuity, but panned Pop's "slogans, social theory, in-jokes, bad poetry, and vocal dramaturgy." Sandy Robertson of Sounds felt although the album was "hardly challenging like early Pop overdosed-and-on-his-knees binges," Chris Stein courageously provides little of his familiar style; "instead it's a bespectacled text."

In his retrospective review, Mark Deming of AllMusic wrote "sadly, Iggy himself didn't rise especially well to the occasion here; his lyrics are often a bizarre mélange of free-association without any clear focus, and one senses that Stein was a bit too awed by working with his hero to have the nerve to tell him when his vocals were wandering off-pitch (or out of tune altogether). [...] ultimately, this album's a failure, but it's certainly one of the most interesting and ambitious failures of Iggy's career". Ian Gittins of Classic Pop described Zombie Birdhouse as "a curious and rambling affair, an undisciplined exercise in jagged art-rock which Iggy seemed to be making up as he went along." He concluded that the album "was patently a lot of fun to make. Listening to it more than once? A different matter entirely." In a positive review, Ross Horton of The Line of Best Fit felt the album was "an absolutely delicious car-crash of a record, all twisted metal and noxious fumes. It's undoubtedly the noblest kind of failure, the result of two drug-damaged, burned-out rock 'n' roll casualties turning to a mediocre songwriter to cook up a set of classics. It was never going to work out exactly how they wanted, but it does almost work out."

== Track listing ==
All tracks are written by Iggy Pop and Rob Duprey, except "Ordinary Bummer" and "Street Crazies", written by Pop.

Side A
No.	Title	Length
1.	"Run Like a Villain"	3:00
2.	"The Villagers"	3:46
3.	"Angry Hills"	2:55
4.	"Life of Work"	3:44
5.	"The Ballad of Cookie McBride"	2:58
6.	"Ordinary Bummer"	2:40

Side B
No.	Title	Length
1.	"Eat or Be Eaten"	3:14
2.	"Bulldozer"	2:16
3.	"Platonic"	2:39
4.	"The Horse Song"	2:57
5.	"Watching the News"	4:10
6.	"Street Crazies"	3:53

Reissue bonus track
No.	Title	Length
13.	"Pain and Suffering"	3:39

All tracks are written by Iggy Pop and Rob Duprey, except where noted.

2003 reissue bonus disc
No.	Title	Writer(s)	Length
1.	"The Villagers"		3:59
2.	"Fall in Love with Me"	Pop, David Bowie, Hunt Sales, Tony Sales	3:06
3.	"Ordinary Bummer"		3:04
4.	"The Horse Song"		2:26
5.	"Angry Hills"		3:02
6.	"Bulldozer"		2:20
7.	"The Ballad of Cookie McBride"		3:47
8.	"Platonic"		2:41
9.	"Life of Work"		3:56
10.	"Kill City"	Pop, James Williamson	2:36
11.	"Loose"	The Stooges	2:52
12.	"Search and Destroy"	The Stooges	3:05
13.	"Run Like a Villain"		3:34
14.	"Bang Bang"	Pop, Ivan Král	3:37
15.	"Your Pretty Face Is Going to Hell"	Pop, Williamson	3:16
16.	"Eat or Be Eaten"		3:44
17.	"Sixteen"	Pop	3:00
18.	"Street Crazies"		3:35

== Personnel ==
- Iggy Pop – vocals
- Rob Duprey – guitar, keyboards, background vocals
- Chris Stein – bass on A5, A6, B2, B3, B6, art direction
- Clem Burke – drums, percussion

Technical

- Joe Arlotta – session engineer
- Butch Jones – mixing engineer
- Esther Friedman – cover photography
