= Naughty Little Doggie =

Studio album by Iggy Pop
- Released: March 5, 1996
- Recorded: June 20 – July 1, 1995
- Studios: Track Record, Inc., Hollywood, California, United States
- Genres: Hard rock; grunge
- Length: 40:05
- Label: Virgin
- Producers: Iggy Pop, Thom Wilson

Iggy Pop chronology
American Caesar (1993)	Naughty Little Doggie (1996)	Nude & Rude: The Best of Iggy Pop (1996)

Singles from Naughty Little Doggie
- 1. "Heart Is Saved" Released: 1996; 2. "To Belong" Released: 1996; 3. "I Wanna Live" Released: 1996

Naughty Little Doggie is the eleventh studio album by American rock singer Iggy Pop, released in 1996. The last track, "Look Away", features his tribute to Johnny Thunders and Sable Starr. The photography is by David Sims and Anton Corbijn and the artwork is by Phil Bicker.

A music video was made for the song "To Belong".

== Music ==
Naughty Little Doggie has been likened in its style to grunge, with Stephen Thomas Erlewine retrospectively calling it and its 1993 predecessor American Caesar "grungy detours".

== Reception ==
Professional ratings
Review scores
Source	Rating
AllMusic	2.5/5 stars
The Encyclopedia of Popular Music	3/5 stars
The Rolling Stone Album Guide	2.5/5 stars

Mark Deming of AllMusic praised the vocal performance of Pop and musicianship of the guitarist and drummer in this release, but criticized the songwriting stating it was not particularly inspiring. Additionally, Deming stated it could not be compared to Pop's previous masterpiece albums and compared it to the 1988 release, Instinct. Ultimately, Deming stated it was a solid release and a respectable hard rock album despite his perception of its mediocrity.

== Track listing ==
All tracks composed by Iggy Pop, except where noted.

1. "I Wanna Live" (Whitey Kirst, Pop) – 4:31
2. "Pussy Walk" (Pop, Eric Schermerhorn) – 3:47
3. "Innocent World" – 3:28
4. "Knucklehead" – 4:09
5. "To Belong" – 4:11
6. "Keep on Believing" (Pop, Schermerhorn) – 2:29
7. "Outta My Head" – 5:36
8. "Shoeshine Girl" (Pop, Schermerhorn) – 3:50
9. "Heart Is Saved" – 3:02
10. "Look Away" – 5:02

B-sides and alternative versions

- "I Wanna Be Your Dog" (Live; B-Side to "Pussy Walk" promotional single) – 4:56

== Personnel ==
- Iggy Pop – vocals, guitar

The Fuckups

- Eric Mesmerize (Eric Schermerhorn) – guitar
- Hal Wonderful (Hal Cragin) – bass, keyboards on "Shoeshine Girl"
- Larry Contrary (Larry Mullins) – drums

Additional personnel

- The Mighty Whitey (Whitey Kirst) – guitar

== Charts ==
Chart performance for Naughty Little Doggie
Chart (1996)	Peak position
Australian Albums (ARIA)	83
Austrian Albums (Ö3 Austria)	33
Belgian Albums (Ultratop Wallonia)	19
Finnish Albums (Suomen virallinen lista)	32
German Albums (Offizielle Top 100)	51
Swedish Albums (Sverigetopplistan)	35
Swiss Albums (Schweizer Hitparade)	42
UK Albums (Official Charts)	77
