= Teatime Dub Encounters =

EP by Underworld and Iggy Pop
- Released: July 27, 2018
- Genre: Electronic
- Label: Caroline International
- Producer: Rick Smith

Underworld chronology
Live at Summer Sonic 2016 (2016)	Teatime Dub Encounters (2018)	Drift (2019)

Iggy Pop chronology
Post Pop Depression (2016)	Teatime Dub Encounters (2018)	Free (2019)

Singles from Teatime Dub Encounters
- 1. "Get Your Shirt" Released: July 6, 2018

Teatime Dub Encounters is a collaborative EP by British electronic music group Underworld and American singer-songwriter Iggy Pop. It was released on July 27, 2018, by Caroline International, except in Japan where it was released by Beat Records.

== Critical reception ==
Professional ratings
Aggregate scores
Source	Rating
Metacritic	65/100
Review scores
Source	Rating
AllMusic	3/5 stars
Consequence of Sound	C−
Drowned in Sound	8/10
The Guardian	4/5 stars
The Music	4.5/5 stars
NME	4/5 stars
The Observer	3/5 stars
Pitchfork	4.7/10
Under the Radar	8/10

At Metacritic, which assigns a normalised rating out of 100 to reviews from mainstream publications, Teatime Dub Encounters received an average score of 65, based on eight reviews, indicating "generally favorable reviews".

== Commercial performance ==
Teatime Dub Encounters debuted at number 20 on the UK Albums Chart, selling 2,782 units in its first week. It also debuted at number two on the Vinyl Albums Chart in the UK, where it sold 789 copies of the vinyl edition.

== Track listing ==
All tracks are written by Rick Smith, Karl Hyde and Iggy Pop.

No.	Title	Length
1.	"Bells & Circles"	7:29
2.	"Trapped"	7:43
3.	"I'll See Big"	4:46
4.	"Get Your Shirt"	7:30

== Personnel ==
- Iggy Pop - vocals
- Karl Hyde
- Rick Smith

with:

- Esme Bronwen-Smith - additional vocals

== Charts ==
Chart (2018)	Peak position
Scottish Albums (OCC)	11
UK Albums (OCC)	20
UK Album Downloads (OCC)	16
UK Albums Sales (OCC)	13
UK Physical Albums (OCC)	12
UK Vinyl Albums (OCC)	2
US Independent Albums (Billboard)	22
