= Bang Bang (Iggy Pop song) =

1981 song by Iggy Pop

Single by Iggy Pop

from the album Party
- B-side: "Sea of Love"
- Released: May 1981
- Recorded: 1981
- Studio: Record Plant, New York City
- Genre: Dance-rock; new wave
- Length: 4:08
- Label: Arista
- Songwriters: Iggy Pop, Ivan Kral
- Producers: Thom Panunzio; Tommy Boyce

Iggy Pop singles chronology
"Knocking 'em Down (In The City)" (1980)	"Bang Bang" (1981)	"Pumpin' For Jill" (1981)

"Bang Bang" is a song written by Iggy Pop and Ivan Kral in 1981 for Pop's Party album. It was released as a single, charting at No. 35 on the Billboard Club Play Singles chart. According to Pop's autobiography I Need More, he wrote "Bang Bang" as Arista Records wanted a single and he promised them a commercial album. He originally wanted Phil Spector or Mike Chapman to produce the song. Instead, songwriter Tommy Boyce was brought in. Pop claimed he got the idea for the song from reading The Right Stuff at a local bookstore.

== Personnel ==
- Iggy Pop – vocals
- Ivan Kral – guitar, keyboards
- Rob Duprey – guitar
- Michael Page – bass
- Douglas Bowne – drums
- Jimmy Whizner – arrangements

== David Bowie version ==
"Bang Bang"

Promotional single by David Bowie

from the album Never Let Me Down
- Released: 1987
- Length: 4:09 (live version); 4:01 (vinyl album version)
- Label: EMI
- Songwriters: Iggy Pop, Ivan Kral
- Producers: David Bowie; David Richards

Pop's friend David Bowie covered "Bang Bang" for his 1987 album Never Let Me Down. When asked about his choice of including Pop's song on the album (instead of perhaps co-writing a new song), Bowie stated "Iggy's done so many good songs that people never get to hear ... I think it's one of his best songs, 'Bang Bang,' and it hasn't been heard, and now it might be." Released as a promotional single in late 1987, the live version includes Peter Frampton on guitar. In 2018, Bowie's original album version was re-engineered as part of Bowie's posthumous Never Let Me Down 2018 release.

=== Track listing ===
All tracks are written by David Bowie (except where noted).

No.	Title	Length
1.	"Bang Bang (live version)" (recorded at the Olympic Stadium, Montreal Canada, 30 August 1987 during the Glass Spider Tour)	4:09
2.	"Modern Love" (from the album Let's Dance, 1983)	4:47
3.	"Loving the Alien" (from the album Tonight, 1984)	7:08
4.	"Bang Bang (album version)" (Pop, Kral)	4:01

=== Chart position ===
Chart	Peak position
US Mainstream Rock Tracks	38
