= The Iguanas (Michigan band) =

American garage rock band

- Origin: Ann Arbor, Michigan, United States
- Genre: Garage rock
- Years active: 1963–1967
- Label: Forte
- Past members: Iggy Pop; Jim McLaughlin; Nick Kolokithas; Don Swickerath; Sam Swisher

The Iguanas were an American garage rock band formed in Ann Arbor, Michigan, in 1963. Beginning as a duo, the group is best-remembered as the launching pad for the musical career of influential punk rock artist Iggy Pop. The band was one of the most popular acts in Michigan during 1965, and recorded one single, a cover version of Bo Diddley's "Mona", along with additional material later released on compilation albums.

== History ==
Ann Arbor High School students Iggy Pop, then known by his birth name Jim Osterberg (drums, vocals), and Jim McLaughlin (lead guitar, vocals) first came together as a duo, extensively rehearsing before making their debut at the school's talent show. By 1963, the two were joined by classmates Nick Kolokithas (rhythm guitar, vocals), Don Swickerath (bass guitar), and Sam Swisher (saxophone, flute, backing vocals) to form the Iguanas. Through the mid-1960s, the band performed covers of British Invasion songs at high school concerts and fraternity parties at the University of Michigan, while also conducting two demo recording sessions. Alluding to the Iguanas, fans of the band, particularly Osterberg, began to address him as "Iggy", inspiring the drummer's later stage name he adopted while performing with the Stooges.

By early 1965, the Iguanas were one of the hippest bands among Michigan's teen garage scene. Cub Koda, the leader of Brownsville Station, recalled spectating at the group's concerts several times, and praised Osterberg's drum work and re-interpreted versions of songs like "Louie, Louie" and "Wild Weekend". Around the same time, the Iguanas pressed 1,000 copies of their debut single, a rendition of "Mona", on the group's own Forte Records label. Conflicts arose between Osterberg and his bandmates over the record's B-side, which eventually was filled by Kolokithas's "I Don't Know Why". Osterberg had insisted that his song "Again and Again", the first original composition penned by him, be the flipside, but he was overruled.

Osterberg negotiated the band's residency at the Club Ponytail in mid-1965, a teen dance club located in the Harbor Springs resort area. At the venue, the Iguanas often shared the bill with acts like the Four Tops, the Shangri-Las, and the Kingsmen. However, the Iguanas's British pop sound was soon losing favor with the region's fanbase. Osterberg took notice to the change and departed in 1966 to join the blues rock band the Prime Movers. Although the Iguanas attempted to continue without Osterberg, the group disbanded in 1967 when a record deal with Columbia Records failed to materialize. In 1996, Norton Records released The Iguanas, a compilation album which assembles all of the group's recordings and demos. The Iguanas were inducted into the Michigan Rock and Roll Legends Hall of Fame in 2018.

== Discography ==
=== Single ===
- "Mona" b/w "I Don't Know Why" – Forte Records (AR-201), 1965

=== Album ===
- The Iguanas – Norton Records (ED-251), 1996
