= Skull Ring =

Studio album by Iggy Pop
- Released: November 4, 2003
- Recorded: January–February 2003
- Studio: Hit Factory Criteria (Miami)
- Genre: Punk rock
- Length: 61:38
- Label: Virgin
- Producers: Iggy Pop, Greig Nori ("Little Know It All")

Iggy Pop chronology
Beat 'Em Up (2001)	Skull Ring (2003)	A Million in Prizes: The Anthology (2005)

Singles from Skull Ring
- 1. "Little Know It All" Released: 2003; 2. "Motor Inn" Released: 2004

Professional ratings
Aggregate scores
Source	Rating
Metacritic	74/100
Review scores
Source	Rating
AllMusic	4/5 stars
The Encyclopedia of Popular Music	3/5 stars
The Guardian	3/5 stars
Pitchfork	4.1/10
PopMatters	
Rolling Stone	3/5 stars
The Rolling Stone Album Guide	3/5 stars

Skull Ring is the fourteenth studio album by American rock singer Iggy Pop, released in November 2003. Every track on the album features guest performers, such as the Stooges, the Trolls, Green Day, Sum 41, and Peaches.

== Background ==
The performers on most of the tracks on the album are the Trolls, Iggy's band from the Beat 'Em Up era. Members of his original band the Stooges also appear on some of the songs.

One single, "Little Know It All", was released from the album and featured Sum 41, and the music video for the song received significant airplay.. "Little Know It All" also appeared in the video game NASCAR Thunder 2004.

== Track listing ==
1. "Little Electric Chair" (featuring the Stooges) (Iggy Pop, Ron Asheton, Scott Asheton) – 4:40
2. "Perverts in the Sun" (featuring the Trolls) (Pop, Whitey Kirst, Alex Kirst, Pete Marshall) – 3:18
3. "Skull Ring" (featuring the Stooges) – 3:51
4. "Superbabe" (featuring the Trolls) – 4:09
5. "Loser" (featuring the Stooges) – 2:41
6. "Private Hell" (featuring Green Day) (Pop, Billie Joe Armstrong) – 2:50
7. "Little Know It All" (featuring Sum 41) (Pop, Deryck Whibley, Greig Nori) – 3:33
8. "Whatever" (featuring the Trolls) – 3:16
9. "Dead Rock Star" (featuring the Stooges) – 4:39
10. "Rock Show" (featuring Peaches) (Merrill Nisker) – 2:08
11. "Here Comes the Summer" (featuring the Trolls) – 4:53
12. "Motor Inn" (featuring Feedom with Peaches) (Pop, Nisker, Jason Beck, Dave Szigeti) – 4:11
13. "Inferiority Complex" (featuring the Trolls) – 4:13
14. "Supermarket" (featuring Green Day) – 3:01
15. "'Til Wrong Feels Right" (Pop) – 3:13
16. "Blood on Your Cool" (featuring the Trolls) – 7:02
17. "Nervous Exhaustion" (hidden track featuring the Trolls)

B-sides and alternative versions

- "Motor Inn" (Felix da Housecat's High Octane mix) – 6:12
- "Motor Inn" (Felix da Housecat's High Octane mix instrumental) – 6:12
- "Jose the Arab" (featuring the Trolls; released on Skull Ring EP) – 2:56
- "Ready to Run" (featuring the Trolls; released on Skull Ring EP) – 3:02

== Personnel ==
- Iggy Pop – lead vocals, acoustic guitar on track 15
- Whitey Kirst – guitar on tracks 2, 4, 8, 11, 13, 16, 17
- Pete Marshall – bass on tracks 2, 4, 8, 11, 13, 16, 17
- Alex Kirst – drums, percussion on tracks 2, 4, 8, 11, 13, 16, 17
- Ron Asheton – guitar, bass on tracks 1, 3, 5, 9
- Scott Asheton – drums, percussion on tracks 1, 3, 5, 9
- Billie Joe Armstrong – guitar, backing vocals on tracks 6, 14
- Mike Dirnt – bass on tracks 6, 14
- Tré Cool – drums, percussion on tracks 6, 14
- Deryck Whibley – rhythm guitar, vocals on track 7
- Dave Baksh – lead guitar on track 7
- Jason McCaslin – bass on track 7
- Steve Jocz – drums, percussion on track 7
- Peaches – vocals, electronics, samples on tracks 10, 12
- Steve Keeping – additional drums on tracks 10, 12

== Charts ==
Chart performance for Skull Ring
Chart (2003)	Peak position
French Albums (SNEP)	34
