= Mooseman =

American bassist (1962–2001)

- Born: Lloyd Roberts III; December 24, 1962; Bernice, Louisiana, U.S.
- Died: February 22, 2001 (aged 38) Los Angeles, California, U.S.
- Genres: Crossover thrash; rap metal; thrash metal; heavy metal
- Occupation: Bassist
- Years active: 1988–2001
- Formerly of: Body Count

Lloyd "Mooseman" Roberts III (December 24, 1962 – February 22, 2001) was an American musician, best known as a bassist for the rap metal band Body Count. Roberts was a key writer in the early years of Body Count.

He also played with Iggy Pop, and recorded the studio album Beat 'Em Up as a member of the Trolls. Lloyd Roberts III also played with Onojee and Bhava Hari. He received awards in association with the bands he played with, such as gold records with Ice-T (Body Count) and the Hawaii Music Awards for Best World Music with Bhava Hari.

Roberts was born in Bernice, Louisiana. He attended Crenshaw High School in South Central Los Angeles, where he played in his high school band, met, and became close friends with Ice-T and D-Roc (Dennis Miles), with whom he would eventually form Body Count.

Roberts recorded the album Beat 'Em Up with Iggy Pop before being killed in a drive-by shooting. He was 38 years old.
