= Every Loser =

2023 studio album by Iggy Pop

Studio album by Iggy Pop
- Released: January 6, 2023
- Genres: Punk rock; alternative rock; garage punk; spoken word
- Length: 36:53
- Labels: Gold Tooth; Atlantic
- Producer: Andrew Watt

Iggy Pop chronology
Free (2019)	Every Loser (2023)

Singles from Every Loser
- 1. "Frenzy" Released: October 28, 2022; 2. "Strung Out Johnny" Released: December 12, 2022

Every Loser is the nineteenth studio album by American rock singer Iggy Pop, released on January 6, 2023, by Gold Tooth and Atlantic Records. Produced by Andrew Watt, the album features a core backing band of Chad Smith as drummer and multi-instrumentalists Watt and Josh Klinghoffer.

The album features guest contributions from Jane's Addiction members Dave Navarro, Eric Avery and Chris Chaney, alongside appearances from Guns N' Roses bassist Duff McKagan, Pearl Jam guitarist Stone Gossard, and drummers Taylor Hawkins and Travis Barker.

== Background ==
On October 28, 2022, Pop shared the first single "Frenzy" with contributions from Duff McKagan and Chad Smith. The song was described as "raw" and "energetic". The singer announced the album along with release details on his social media accounts on November 10, 2022. Upon announcing the album, Pop called the collaboration with Watt and Gold Tooth as "old-fashioned". The intention of the album is to "beat the shit out of" the listener.

== Critical reception ==
Professional ratings
Aggregate scores
Source	Rating
Metacritic	79/100
Review scores
Source	Rating
DIY	4/5 stars
The Guardian	4/5 stars
NME	4/5 stars
Pitchfork	6.9/10
The Skinny	4/5 stars
Slant	4/5 stars

The music of Every Loser has been described as punk rock, alternative rock, garage punk, and spoken word. The album received generally positive reviews from critics. At Metacritic, which assigns a normalized rating out of 100 to reviews from critics, the album received an average score of 79, which indicates "generally favorable reviews", based on seven reviews.

Stuart Berman of Pitchfork wrote, "For Every Loser, [producer] Watt doesn’t try to turn Iggy Pop into something he’s not but rather gives him the space to be every Iggy Pop he wants to be. Over the course of its 11 tracks, we’re treated to a parade of iconic Iggy archetypes: the profane punk, the seedy underworld Sinatra, the Euro-bound futurist, the lovable curmudgeon, and (via the Warhol-inspired comedic interlude “The News for Andy”) the world's coolest infomercial pitchman. Watt effectively approaches the album as an Iggy jukebox musical — a shiny, over-the-top, but briskly entertaining celebration of its subject — while surrounding him with a supporting cast of acolytes eager to do their hero proud."

== Promotion ==
To promote the album, Pop announced that his backing band would be called The Losers and would consist of Chad Smith, Duff McKagan, Josh Klinghoffer, and Andrew Watt. They performed the song "Frenzy" on Jimmy Kimmel Live! on January 9, 2023.

== Track listing ==
Every Loser track listing
No.	Title	Writer(s)	Length
1.	"Frenzy"	Iggy Pop; Andrew Watt; Duff McKagan; Chad Smith	3:00
2.	"Strung Out Johnny"	Pop; Watt; Josh Klinghoffer; Smith	4:13
3.	"New Atlantis"	Pop; Watt; McKagan; Smith	4:08
4.	"Modern Day Ripoff"	Pop; Watt; McKagan; Smith	3:29
5.	"Morning Show"	Pop; Watt	3:47
6.	"The News for Andy" (interlude)	Pop; Watt	0:55
7.	"Neo Punk"	Pop; Watt; Klinghoffer; Travis Barker	2:15
8.	"All the Way Down"	Pop; Watt; Stone Gossard; Smith	4:29
9.	"Comments"	Pop; Watt; Eric Avery; Taylor Hawkins	3:53
10.	"My Animus" (interlude)	Pop; Watt	1:02
11.	"The Regency"	Pop; Watt; Dave Navarro; Chris Chaney; Hawkins	5:42
Total length:			36:53

== Personnel ==
Musicians

- Iggy Pop – lead vocals (all tracks), background vocals (tracks 2, 3)
- Andrew Watt – guitar (all tracks), background vocals (1–3, 5, 9, 11), bass guitar (2, 5, 6, 8), keyboards (2, 3, 8, 9, 11), piano (4, 5, 8, 9, 11), sequenced drums (6), percussion (11)
- Duff McKagan – bass guitar (1, 3, 4)
- Chad Smith – drums (1–6, 8), percussion (2–5, 8)
- Josh Klinghoffer – guitar (2, 9, 10), keyboards (2, 8, 10), piano (2, 3, 6, 7), organ (3, 5), bass guitar (7), synthesizer (9)
- Travis Barker – drums (7)
- Stone Gossard – guitar (8)
- Eric Avery – bass guitar (9)
- Taylor Hawkins – drums, percussion, piano (9, 11)
- Chris Chaney – bass guitar (11)
- Dave Navarro – guitar (11)

Technical

- Andrew Watt – production, executive production
- Matt Colton – mastering
- Alan Moulder – mixing
- Paul LaMalfa – engineering
- Marco Sonzini – engineering
- Jimmy Douglass – engineering
- Devon Corey – engineering (3–11), additional engineering (1, 2)
- Tom Herbers – mixing assistance
- Finn Howells – mixing assistance
- Caesar Edmunds – mixing assistance (6)
- Jimmy Davis – additional engineering

Visuals

- Andrew Watt – art direction, photography
- David J. Harrigan III – art direction, design
- Raymond Pettibon – cover art
- Mick Rock – cover photo
- Vincent Guignet – photography
- Spenser Anderson – photography
- Laura Bradley – photography

== Charts ==
Chart performance for Every Loser
Chart (2023)	Peak position
Australian Albums (ARIA)	72
Austrian Albums (Ö3 Austria)	7
Belgian Albums (Ultratop Flanders)	28
Belgian Albums (Ultratop Wallonia)	15
Croatian International Albums (HDU)	1
Dutch Albums (Album Top 100)	58
Finnish Albums (Suomen virallinen lista)	40
French Albums (SNEP)	8
German Albums (Offizielle Top 100)	2
Hungarian Albums (MAHASZ)	7
Italian Albums (FIMI)	57
Portuguese Albums (AFP)	13
Scottish Albums (Official Charts)	2
Spanish Albums (Promusicae)	58
Swiss Albums (Schweizer Hitparade)	1
UK Albums (Official Charts)	33
