= Soldier (album) =

Studio album by Iggy Pop
- Released: February 1980
- Recorded: August 1979
- Studios: Rockfield (Rockfield, Monmouthshire, Wales)
- Genre: Punk rock
- Length: 37:00
- Label: Arista
- Producer: Pat Moran

Iggy Pop chronology
New Values (1979)	Soldier (1980)	Party (1981)

Singles from Soldier
- 1. "Loco Mosquito" Released: 1980; 2. "Knocking 'em Down (In the City)" Released: 1980; 3. "Dog Food" Released: 1980

Soldier is the fourth studio album by American rock singer Iggy Pop. It was released in February 1980 by record label Arista.

== Recording ==
For the album Iggy collaborated with ex-Sex Pistols bassist Glen Matlock.

Ex-member of The Stooges James Williamson was originally hired to produce the album, but a conflict between Williamson and David Bowie (who was assisting as a friend of Pop) over recording techniques led to Williamson walking out on the project. Williamson said, "Anytime you fall out with someone, it's usually more than just the one thing that triggers it. The final straw, though, was when we were recording Soldier… The material wasn't there. I didn't like the studio. Just very unhappy with the whole experience."

Bowie and Simple Minds provide backing vocals on "Play It Safe".

There has been some debate over the lack of lead guitar on the final mix, which has been criticized by Glen Matlock. In Pop's biography, Matlock claims that the lead guitar was stripped after Bowie was punched by Steve New for hitting on his girlfriend of that time, Patti Palladin. Elsewhere, Matlock said Pop "mixed out Steve's part because he bore a grudge. But he mixed out the hook to my song. And that's why I didn't want to bother with him anymore."

== Release ==
Soldier was released in February 1980 by record label Arista. The album peaked at number 125 on the Billboard charts. Videos were made for the songs "Loco Mosquito", "Knocking 'Em Down (In the City)" and "Dog Food".

== Critical reception ==
Professional ratings
Review scores
Source	Rating
AllMusic	3/5 stars
Robert Christgau	B+
The Encyclopedia of Popular Music	2/5 stars
Record Mirror	4/5 stars
The Rolling Stone Album Guide	2.5/5 stars

Soldier has received a mixed-to-favorable reception from critics.

In her retrospective review, Charlotte Robinson of PopMatters wrote "Instead of a punk masterpiece, [...] Soldier turned out to be an uneven and sometimes plain silly recording."

Rolling Stone's David Fricke reviewed the album positively, calling attention to Iggy Pop's successful weathering of his own self-destructive persona. Of the album, Fricke wrote: "Soldier, like all of his albums, is a hard-fought battle in a war that Iggy Pop is determined to win. Call him Ig noble."

== Track listing ==
Side A
No.	Title	Writer(s)	Length
1.	"Loco Mosquito"	Iggy Pop	3:13
2.	"Ambition"	Glen Matlock	3:25
3.	"Knocking 'Em Down (In the City)"	Pop	3:20
4.	"Play It Safe"	David Bowie, Pop	3:05
5.	"Get Up & Get Out"	Pop	2:43
6.	"Mr. Dynamite"	Matlock, Pop	4:17

Side B
No.	Title	Writer(s)	Length
7.	"Dog Food"	Pop	1:47
8.	"I Need More"	Matlock, Pop	4:02
9.	"Take Care of Me"	Matlock, Pop	3:25
10.	"I'm a Conservative"	Pop	3:55
11.	"I Snub You"	Barry Andrews, Pop	3:07

2000 remastered reissue bonus tracks
No.	Title	Writer(s)	Length
12.	"Low Life"	Ivan Kral, Pop	2:57
13.	"Drop a Hook" (instrumental)	Pop	4:25

=== Alternate track listing ===
Specific regions and the 1991 Arista CD reissue had the following alternate track order:

No.	Title	Length
1.	"Loco Mosquito"	3:13
2.	"Ambition"	3:25
3.	"Take Care of Me"	3:25
4.	"Get Up and Get Out"	2:43
5.	"Play it Safe"	3:05
6.	"I'm a Conservative"	3:55
7.	"Dog Food"	1:47
8.	"I Need More"	4:02
9.	"Knocking 'Em Down (In the City)"	3:20
10.	"Mr. Dynamite"	4:17
11.	"I Snub You"	3:07

== Personnel ==
- Iggy Pop – vocals
- Glen Matlock – bass guitar, backing vocals
- Ivan Kral – guitar, keyboards
- Klaus Krüger – drums
- Steve New – guitar
- Barry Andrews – keyboards

with:

- Simple Minds (Jim Kerr and Derek Forbes) – backing vocals on "Play It Safe"
- David Bowie, Patti Palladin, Glen Matlock, Steve New, Ivan Kral, James Williamson – backing vocals on "Play It Safe"
- Henry McGroggan – chorus on "Loco Mosquito"

Technical

- Pat Moran – production
- Thom Panunzio – mixing, production on "Low Life"
- Peter Haden – engineering
- Joe Brescio – mastering
- Brian Griffin/Rocking Russian – sleeve design

== Charts ==
Chart performance for Soldier
Chart (1980)	Peak position
Australian Albums (Kent Music Report)	78
New Zealand Albums (RMNZ)	20
Norwegian Albums (VG-lista)	36
Swedish Albums (Sverigetopplistan)	27
UK Albums (Official Charts)	62
US Billboard 200	125
