= Rob Duprey =

American songwriter

- Origin: United States
- Genres: Punk rock, rock music
- Occupations: musician, songwriter
- Instruments: guitar, keyboard
- Formerly of: Mumps

Rob Duprey is an American rock guitarist, keyboardist and songwriter. Duprey first came to prominence as guitarist for the mid-1970s New York City underground pop band Mumps, led by Lance Loud and Kristian Hoffman. Later, he worked with Iggy Pop, playing guitar on Party (1981) and co-writing the bulk of Zombie Birdhouse.

He is currently a member of the Washington DC-area band, The Loggers, along with Stock Wilson (guitar, vocals), Vince Sanfuentes (bass), and Piers Hackley (drums).

== Selected discography (as guitarist) ==
- Mumps, "Crocodile Tears" single. 1977. (Bomp! Records BEJ-1; reissued 2005, Sympathy For The Record Industry SFTRI 759)
- Mumps, "Rock & Roll This, Rock & Roll That" single. 1978. (Perfect Records PR-1)
- Gary Valentine, "The First One" single. 1978. (Beat Records Beat 001)
- Iggy Pop, Party LP. 1981. (Arista AL 9572)
- Iggy Pop, Zombie Birdhouse LP. 1982. (Animal Records APE 6000)
- Cosmetic with Jamaaladeen Tacuma, So Tranquilizin' CD. 1985. (Gramavision 18-1210-1)
- Iggy Pop, Live CD. 1991. (Revenge Records ME 109 bis)
- Mumps, Fatal Charm: 1975-1980 -- A Brief History of a Brief History compilation CD. 1994. (Eggbert Records ER80011CD)
- Mumps, How I Saved The World compilation CD and DVD. 2005. (Sympathy for the Record Industry SFTRI 754)
