= Whitey Kirst =

Canadian rock musician

- Also known as: The Mighty Whitey
- Born: Whitehorn Kirst
- Genres: Hard rock, punk rock, garage rock, glam rock
- Occupation(s): Singer-songwriter, musician
- Instrument(s): Vocals, guitar
- Years active: 1987–present
- Labels: Wos Records
- Website: www.facebook.com/pages/Whitey-Kirst/400416993487

Whitehorn "Whitey" Kirst is a Canadian rock guitarist, singer and songwriter, primarily known for his long collaboration with Iggy Pop as lead guitarist from 1990 to 2003 and co-composer from 1996 to 2003.

Since 2007, he has formed his own band "The Web of Spider", a straight-ahead rock and roll power trio featuring notably (and chronologically) Phil "Philthy Animal" Taylor, Max Noce, Chris Wyse, Mike Starr, Stefan Adika and Tommy Clufetos.

== Discography ==
=== Solo ===
- Eat Me (2008)
- Vol. 11 (2009)
- All Rise! (2012)

=== With Iggy Pop ===
- Naughty Little Doggie (1996)
- Avenue B (1999)
- Beat 'Em Up (2001)
- Skull Ring (2003)

=== Collaborations ===
- Brick by Brick (1990)
- Freddy's Dead: The Final Nightmare (1991)
- Sunday Nights: The Songs of Junior Kimbrough (2005)
- Licker's Last Leg (Ipecac Recordings) (2007)
- Along Came a Spider (2008)
- The High End of Low (2008)

== Videography ==
- Iggy Pop. Kiss My blood. Live at the Olympia 1991/A film by Tim Pope (DVD) (2004)
- Iggy Pop. Live at the avenue B/Serge Bergli (DVD) (2005)
