= Après =

Studio album by Iggy Pop
- Released: 9 May 2012
- Recorded: February 2010 – June 2011
- Studios: Silverlake Sound, Los Angeles; Crescent Moon Studios, Miami, Florida; The Groove Room, San Rafael, California; Bedford Studios
- Genres: Jazz; blues; rock
- Length: 28:33
- Label: Thousand Mile Inc
- Producer: Hal Cragin

Iggy Pop chronology
Roadkill Rising: The Bootleg Collection 1977–2009 (2011)	Après (2012)	Post Pop Depression (2016)

Après is the sixteenth studio album by American rock singer Iggy Pop.

== Background ==
Consisting partly of covers sung in French, it was released on 9 May 2012 on Thousand Mile Inc after the album was rejected by Virgin EMI Records. Pop said his record company would have 'preferred that I do a rock album with popular punks' and that "They didn't think they would make any money, they didn't think my fans would like it - very sensible attitudes for a sensible sort of person - but that's a different sort of person than I am."

The album has been described as containing ″crooning vocals, Cole Porter covers, soft melodies, and an all-around sense of everything suave″.

When asked by Bill Flanagan if he had heard any good records lately, Bob Dylan mentioned Après.

The cover photo is referring to the figure La Conscience played by Iggy Pop in the French movie L'Étoile du jour (Morning Star) by Sophie Blondy.

== Track listing ==
No.	Title	Writer(s)	Original artist	Length
1.	"Et si tu n'existais pas"	lyrics: Vito Pallavicini, Pierre Delanoë, Claude Lemesle; music: Pasquale Losito, Salvatore Cutugno	Joe Dassin	3:36
2.	"La Javanaise"	Serge Gainsbourg	Serge Gainsbourg	2:33
3.	"Everybody's Talkin'"	Fred Neil	Fred Neil	2:51
4.	"I'm Going Away Smiling"	Yoko Ono	Yoko Ono	2:40
5.	"La Vie en rose"	lyrics: Édith Piaf; music: Louis Guglielmi	Édith Piaf	2:09
6.	"Les Passantes"	lyrics: Antoine Pol; music: Georges Brassens	Georges Brassens	4:12
7.	"Syracuse"	lyrics: Bernard Dimey; music: Henri Salvador	Henri Salvador	2:06
8.	"What Is This Thing Called Love?"	Cole Porter	Cole Porter	2:51
9.	"Michelle"	John Lennon, Paul McCartney	The Beatles	2:45
10.	"Only the Lonely"	lyrics: Sammy Cahn; music: Jimmy Van Heusen	Frank Sinatra	2:51

== Personnel ==
Taken from CD booklet.

- Iggy Pop – vocals (all tracks)
- Hal Cragin – bass (all tracks), guitar (tracks 1–9), piano (tracks 3–5, 7, 8), vocals (track 9)
- Steven Ulrich – electric guitar (tracks 1, 2)
- Danny Blume – acoustic guitar (tracks 1, 2), guitar (track 9)
- Jerry Zaslavsky – organ (tracks 1, 2)
- Jon Cowherd – piano (track 10)
- Ben Perowsky – drums (tracks 5, 9)
- Jerry Marotta – drums (tracks 4, 7)
- Kevin Hupp – drums (tracks 1–3)
- Jainardo Batista – percussion (tracks 1, 2)
- Aaron Halva – tres guitar (tracks 1, 2)
- Lucie Aimé (tracks 1, 5), Sarah Fimm (tracks 1, 2, 9) – backing vocals
- Tim Ouimette – horn arrangements (tracks 5, 8), horns (track 5), trombone (track 8)
- Lulu Gainsbourg – string arrangement (track 2)

Technical

- Hal Cragin – production, mixing, and engineering (all tracks)
- Andy Tommasi – additional production and engineering (tracks 1, 2)
- Alfred Figueroa – engineering (tracks 1, 2), additional engineering (tracks 3–10)
- Kevin Hupp – engineering (tracks 1, 2), additional engineering (tracks 3)
- Adam Armstrong – additional engineering (tracks 4, 7)
- Tim Ouimette – additional engineering (tracks 5)
- Dave McNair – mastering (all tracks)
- Guillaume le Grontec, Sophie Blondy – photography

== Charts ==
2022 chart performance for Après
Chart (2022)	Peak position
German Albums (Offizielle Top 100)	61
