= Brick by Brick =

Studio album by Iggy Pop
- Released: June 25, 1990
- Recorded: February 15 – March 23, 1990
- Studios: Ocean Way, Hollywood; Hollywood Sound, Hollywood
- Genres: Hard rock; heavy metal
- Length: 54:09
- Label: Virgin
- Producer: Don Was

Iggy Pop chronology
Instinct (1988)	Brick by Brick (1990)	American Caesar (1993)

Singles from Brick by Brick
- 1. "Livin' on the Edge of the Night" Released: 1990; 2. "Home" Released: 1990; 3. "Candy" Released: 1990; 4. "Butt Town" Released: 1990; 5. "The Undefeated" Released: 1991

Brick by Brick is the ninth studio album by American singer Iggy Pop, released in June 1990 by Virgin Records.

== Production and content ==
After attracting mixed reviews for much of his 1980s output, Pop hired producer Don Was, who was a longtime fan of Pop's band the Stooges, as producer and opted for a hard rock sound. Many songs on the album incorporate a lyrical theme of the United States facing dangers of cultural decay and implosion. Slash and Duff McKagan of Guns N' Roses fame were featured on the album as songwriters and performers. The cover was drawn by American cartoonist Charles Burns. The album's personnel includes studio musicians Waddy Wachtel and Kenny Aronoff. The album is the first studio album that features Pop contributing guitar. He plays a majority of the guitar parts along with Wachtel and Slash. Was would go on to produce Pop's album Avenue B (1999).

== Release ==
The album peaked at number 90 on the Billboard 200 and stayed on the charts for 37 weeks. The song "Livin' on the Edge of the Night" was released before the album as a soundtrack for the hit movie Black Rain starring Michael Douglas and Andy García. The song reached number 16 on Modern Rock Tracks. "Candy" reached number 30 on Mainstream Rock Tracks, number 5 on Modern Rock Tracks and number 28 on the Billboard Hot 100. The first single from the album, "Home", reached number 2 on Modern Rock Tracks.

== Reception ==
Professional ratings
Review scores
Source	Rating
AllMusic	4.5/5 stars
Chicago Tribune	3.5/4 stars
The Encyclopedia of Popular Music	3/5 stars
Rolling Stone	4/5 stars
The Rolling Stone Album Guide	3.5/5 stars
Select	4/5

The album gave Pop some of his strongest reviews since his David Bowie collaborations, and "Candy", with the B-52's vocalist Kate Pierson, became his first MTV hit. The video for the song found fairly heavy rotation on that station. Videos were also made for "Home", "Butt Town" and "Livin' on the Edge of the Night".

"Butt Town" received high praise from the MTV animated duo Beavis and Butt-Head; the latter stated, "This song has the best lyrics I've ever heard."

== Track listing ==
All songs written by Iggy Pop, except where noted.

1. "Home" – 4:00
2. "Main Street Eyes" – 3:41
3. "I Won't Crap Out" – 4:02
4. "Candy" (with Kate Pierson of the B-52's) – 4:13
5. "Butt Town" – 3:34
6. "The Undefeated" – 5:05
7. "Moonlight Lady" – 3:30
8. "Something Wild" (John Hiatt) – 4:01
9. "Neon Forest" – 7:05
10. "Starry Night" – 4:05
11. "Pussy Power" – 2:47
12. "My Baby Wants to Rock & Roll" (lyrics: Pop; music: Slash) – 4:46
13. "Brick by Brick" – 3:30
14. "Livin' on the Edge of the Night" (Jay Rifkin, Eric Rackin) – 3:38

Alternate versions

- "Pussy Power" (Acoustic demo version released on "Candy" single) – 2:38
- "My Baby Wants to Rock and Roll" (Acoustic demo version released on "Candy" single)
- "The Undefeated" (Acoustic demo version released on "Candy" & "The Undefeated" singles) – 3:37
- "Butt Town" (Acoustic demo version released on "Candy" single)
- "L.A. Blues" (Acoustic demo version released on "The Undefeated" single) – 2:21
- "Brick By Brick" (Acoustic demo version released on "The Undefeated" single) – 3:32
- "Livin' on the Edge of the Night" (Remix) – 3:11

== Personnel ==
- Iggy Pop – vocals, acoustic guitar (tracks: A2, A3, A5–A7, B1, B3, B6), electric guitar (tracks: A3, A4, B2, B4, B5)
- Waddy Wachtel – acoustic guitar (tracks: A2, A3, A5, B6), electric guitar (tracks: A2, A4, A6, B2)
- Charley Drayton – bass (tracks: A2–A4, A6, B1–B3)
- Chuck Domanico – acoustic bass on "Moonlight Lady"
- Duff McKagan – bass (tracks: A1, A5, B4, B5)
- Slash – electric guitar (tracks: A1, A5, B4, B5)
- Jamie Muhoberac – keyboards (tracks: A2, A4, A7, B2, B5, B6); piano on "The Undefeated"; organ on "Starry Night"
- Kenny Aronoff – drums (tracks: A1–B5)
- David Lindley – violin, mandolin on "Main Street Eyes"; slide guitar, bouzouki on "I Won't Crap Out" and "Moonlight Lady"; electric guitar, slide guitar on "Starry Night"; saxophone on "My Baby Wants to Rock & Roll"
- David McMurray – saxophone on "Neon Forest"
- Kate Pierson – duet on "Candy"
- John Hiatt – duet on "Something Wild"
- Ed Cherney – "annoying vocal whine" on "Something Wild"
- Sweet Pea Atkinson, Sir Harry Bowens, Donald Ray Mitchell – backing vocals on "Neon Forest" and "Starry Night"
- Alex Brown – backing vocals on "Pussy Power"
- The Leeching Delinquents (Tom Black, John James, Whitehorn Kirst, Kreg Sludgemottom, Scott Slam, Joe Cooper, Josh Richmond, Paul H. Saylor, Scott Philips, Joel Randell, Darrell Spades, Brian Small, Ewreck Benson, Mickey Finn, Billy Rowe, Man Ray Wheaton, Mike Savage, E. Shepherd Stevenson, Bobby Durango) – backing vocals on "The Undefeated"
- Scott Hackwith, Dale Lavi – backing vocals

Technical

- Produced by Don Was
- Ed Cherney – recording, mixing
- Clark Germain, Dan Bosworth, Eric Rudd, Martin Schmelzle – engineer
- Mastered by Greg Fulginiti
- Suchi Asano Osterberg – production coordination
- Melanie Nissen – art direction
- Charles Burns – cover illustration

== Charts ==
Chart performance for Brick by Brick
Chart (1990)	Peak position
Australian Albums (ARIA)	81
Canada Top Albums/CDs (RPM)	83
Dutch Albums (Album Top 100)	43
German Albums (Offizielle Top 100)	34
Norwegian Albums (VG-lista)	19
Swedish Albums (Sverigetopplistan)	13
Swiss Albums (Schweizer Hitparade)	35
UK Albums (Official Charts)	50
US Billboard 200	90
