= La Javanaise =

Single by Serge Gainsbourg or Juliette Gréco
- Released: 1963
- Recorded: 1963
- Genre: Chanson
- Label: Philips
- Songwriter(s): Serge Gainsbourg

"La Javanaise" is a song written and composed by Serge Gainsbourg originally for Juliette Gréco, and interpreted by both her and Gainsbourg in 1963. The first recordings of both artists constituted the B-sides of each of the two 45s. The title is a pun playing on the Parisian java dance and the javanais argot. The song heavily employs unaltered French words that naturally have an ⟨av⟩ sequence; thus the lyrics resemble the argot.

== Background ==
In 1962, Gréco and Gainsbourg spent a summer's evening listening to records and drinking champagne in the huge lounge at 33, rue de Verneuil. The next day, he sent her La Javanaise. Gréco had debuted it in March 1963 by placing it at the beginning of her cabaret tour La Tête de l'art.

== Recording information ==
- Gainsbourg recording:
  - Recording date: January 1963 at Studio Fontana (London)
  - Arrangements and conducting: Harry Robinson
  - Producer: Jacques Plait
  - Format: 45 rpm EP Philips 432-862 (Title: "Vilaine fille mauvais garçon")
  - Duration: 2:29
  - Release date: March 1963
- Gréco recording:
  - Recording date: 4 April 1963 at Studio Blanqui (Paris)
  - Arrangements and conducting: Jean-Michel Defaye
  - Format: 45 rpm S Philips 373-156
  - Duration: 2:30
  - Release date: May 1963
- Publishers: Warner Chappell Music Publishing, Melody Nelson Publishing

== In films ==
- Bruno Podalydès used this song in the comedy Dieu seul me voit (Versailles-Chantiers) (1998).
- In Ron Howard's Da Vinci Code (2006), this song is played in the car of a French police officer.
- Pascale Ferran used this song in the film Bird People (2014).
- Madeleine Peyroux's 2006 recording was used in Guillermo del Toro's The Shape of Water (2017).
- Emmanuel Mouret uses the song in his 2022 movie Diary of a Fleeting Affair.
