= Avenue B (album) =

Studio album by Iggy Pop
- Released: September 14, 1999
- Recorded: May–June 1998
- Studios: 262 Mott Street; The Theatre; Hal Cragin's Studio 12A, New York
- Genres: Hard rock; acoustic rock
- Length: 49:26
- Label: Virgin
- Producer: Don Was

Iggy Pop chronology
Nude & Rude: The Best of Iggy Pop (1996)	Avenue B (1999)	Beat 'Em Up (2001)

Singles from Avenue B
- 1. "Corruption" Released: 1999

Avenue B is the twelfth studio album by American rock singer Iggy Pop, released in 1999.

A music video was made for the single "Corruption."

The album cover was shot by Jeff Wall.

== Critical reception ==
Professional ratings
Review scores
Source	Rating
AllMusic	1.5/5 stars
The A.V. Club	mixed
Robert Christgau	C
The Encyclopedia of Popular Music	3/5 stars
Entertainment Weekly	B−
NME	7/10
Rolling Stone	2.5/5 stars
The Rolling Stone Album Guide	3/5 stars
Spin	4/10

Avenue B elicited a mixed reaction from music critics. The album holds a score of 52/100 on review aggregate site Album of the Year, indicating mixed reviews.

== Track listing ==
All tracks composed by Iggy Pop, except where noted

1. "No Shit" – 1:21
2. "Nazi Girlfriend" – 2:57
3. "Avenue B" – 5:19
4. "Miss Argentina" – 4:14
5. "Afraid to Get Close" – 0:59
6. "Shakin' All Over" (Johnny Kidd) – 4:35
7. "Long Distance" – 4:56
8. "Corruption" (Hal Cragin, Whitey Kirst, Pop) – 4:23
9. "She Called Me Daddy" – 1:52
10. "I Felt the Luxury" (William Martin, John Medeski, Pop, Christopher Wood) – 6:30
11. "Español" (Whitey Kirst, Pop) – 4:10
12. "Motorcycle" – 2:42
13. "Facade" – 5:28

== B-sides and alternate versions ==
- "Corruption" (Single edit) – 4:00
- "Rock Star Grave" (B-side to "Corruption") – 4:30
- "Hollywood Affair" (featuring Johnny Depp; B-side to "Corruption") – 2:53

== Personnel ==
- Iggy Pop – vocals, guitar, keyboards
- Whitey Kirst – guitar
- Pete "Damien" Marshall – guitar
- Lenny Castro – percussion on "Avenue B" and "Español"
- Hal Cragin – bass
- David Mansfield – violin, viola
- John Medeski – Hammond organ, Wurlitzer
- Larry Mullins – drums, tabla, vibraphone, treated 808
- Billy Martin – drums
- Andrew Scheps – loops, mixing on "Shakin' All Over"
- Chris Wood – bass
- Michael Chaves – keyboards on "Nazi Girlfriend"
- Don Was – guitar on "Long Distance"

== Charts ==
Chart performance for Avenue B
Chart (1999)	Peak position
German Albums (Offizielle Top 100)	27
UK Albums (OCC)	105

== Sales ==
Region	Certification	Certified units/sales
United States	—	15,000
