= New Values =

Studio album by Iggy Pop
- Released: April 27, 1979
- Recorded: 1978
- Studio: Paramount (Hollywood, California)
- Genres: Punk rock; glam rock; new wave
- Length: 39:26
- Label: Arista
- Producer: James Williamson

Iggy Pop chronology
TV Eye Live 1977 (1978)	New Values (1979)	Soldier (1980)

Singles from New Values
- 1. "I'm Bored" Released: 1979; 2. "Five Foot One" Released: 1979

New Values is the third solo album by American musician Iggy Pop. It was released on April 27, 1979, by Arista. It reached number 60 in the UK albums chart, and number 180 on the Billboard 200 and was Pop's first solo effort made without the involvement of David Bowie.

== Background ==
New Values was Pop's first record for Arista and the first collaboration by Pop and James Williamson since Kill City. The album also reunited Pop and Williamson with multi-instrumentalist Scott Thurston, who had played live piano for the Stooges on Metallic K.O. and Kill City.

== Recording and release ==
Although Williamson played guitar on "Don't Look Down", Scott Thurston played guitar on all other tracks, with Williamson concentrating on production. Likewise, although one of the songs was written by Pop and Williamson, five tracks were collaborations between Pop and Thurston.

New Values was released in 1979 by record label Arista. Although well-received critically, the album was not a commercial success, only reaching number 180 in the US Billboard 200 chart.

Videos were made for "I'm Bored" and "Five Foot One".

== Critical reception ==
Professional ratings
Review scores
Source	Rating
AllMusic	4/5 stars
Blender	3/5 stars
Chicago Tribune	3/4 stars
Christgau's Record Guide	B+
The Encyclopedia of Popular Music	2/5 stars
The Rolling Stone Album Guide	3.5/5 stars
Spin Alternative Record Guide	7/10
Uncut	4/5 stars

New Values was well-received by critics. Writing in NME at the time of the album's release, Paul Morley wrote that New Values "conclusively endorses Osterberg [Pop's legal name is James Osterberg] as thinker and Iggy as performer, and the relationship is positive and proud." The New York Times, however, considered New Values to be "bland" compared to the earlier David Bowie-produced albums.

Charlotte Robinson of PopMatters describe New Values as a "delicate balancing act of tough with tender, rebellion with contentment, sincerity with humor, cocksure wailing with nuanced balladeering ... makes the album a winner".

== Legacy ==
David Bowie later covered "Don't Look Down" on his album Tonight (1984) and used it for the opening and closing titles of his short film Jazzin' for Blue Jean.

Pixies frontman Frank Black cited New Values as one of his favorite albums.

"The Endless Sea" was covered by the Australian psychedelic rock band the Church on their 1999 covers album A Box of Birds and Cat Power on her 2022 album Covers. It was also featured on the soundtrack of the 1986 film Dogs in Space, starring Michael Hutchence.

== Track listing ==
All tracks are written by Iggy Pop, except where noted.

Side A
No.	Title	Writer(s)	Length
1.	"Tell Me a Story"		2:50
2.	"New Values"	Pop, Scott Thurston	2:39
3.	"Girls"		3:00
4.	"I'm Bored"		2:47
5.	"Don't Look Down"	Pop, James Williamson	3:39
6.	"The Endless Sea"		4:50

Side B
No.	Title	Writer(s)	Length
1.	"Five Foot One"		4:29
2.	"How Do Ya Fix a Broken Part"		2:55
3.	"Angel"	Pop, Thurston	3:44
4.	"Curiosity"	Pop, Thurston	2:29
5.	"African Man"		3:35
6.	"Billy Is a Runaway"	Pop, Thurston	2:31

2000 remastered edition bonus tracks
No.	Title	Writer(s)	Length
13.	"Chains" (previously unreleased)	Pop, Williamson, Thurston	2:40
14.	"Pretty Flamingo" (B-side to "Five Foot One")		2:53

== Personnel ==
- Iggy Pop – vocals
- Scott Thurston – guitars, keyboards, synthesizer, harp, horn arrangements
- Jackie Clark – bass
- Klaus Krüger – drums
- John Harden – horns
- David Brock – strings, string arrangement
- Earl Shackelford – backing vocals
- The Alfono Sisters (Anna and Mary) – backing vocals on "Don't Look Down" and "Angel"
- James Williamson – guitars on "New Values", "Curiosity", and "Billy is a Runaway", horn arrangements, production, mixing

Technical

- Lloyd Malan – production assistance
- Peter Haden – engineering, mixing
- Paul Henry – sleeve design and art direction
- Trevor Rogers – sleeve photography
- Graphyk – sleeve graphics

== Charts ==
Chart performance for New Values
Chart (1979)	Peak position
Australian Albums (Kent Music Report)	36
New Zealand Albums (RMNZ)	18
Swedish Albums (Sverigetopplistan)	37
UK Albums (Official Charts)	60
US Billboard 200	180
