= Blah-Blah-Blah (Iggy Pop album) =

1986 studio album by Iggy Pop

Studio album by Iggy Pop
- Released: September 29, 1986
- Recorded: May 1986
- Studio: Mountain (Montreux, Switzerland)
- Genre: Rock; dance-rock; new wave
- Length: 46:12
- Label: A&M
- Producer: David Bowie; David Richards

Iggy Pop chronology
Zombie Birdhouse (1982)	Blah-Blah-Blah (1986)	Instinct (1988)

Singles from Blah-Blah-Blah
- 1. "Cry for Love" Released: October 1986; 2. "Real Wild Child (Wild One)" Released: November 1986; 3. "Shades" Released: February 1987; 4. "Fire Girl" Released: April 1987; 5. "Isolation" Released: June 1987

Blah-Blah-Blah is the seventh studio album by American musician Iggy Pop. Released in September 1986, on the label A&M, it is his most commercially successful album. Blah-Blah-Blah appeared after a four-year hiatus for Pop, with David Bowie serving as his prime collaborator. It would be their final collaboration. A successful tour followed the album's release.

== Production ==
The collection included a cover of Johnny O'Keefe's "Wild One" (here titled "Real Wild Child (Wild One)" and three original songs co-written with ex-Sex Pistols guitarist Steve Jones. The remaining tracks were co-written by Bowie, who also produced the album with David Richards but, unlike his previous work with Pop, The Idiot and Lust for Life (both 1977), did not play any instruments, although he did contribute with backing vocals. Bowie biographer David Buckley has reported that Pop "virtually disowned" the record, calling it "a Bowie album in all but name". It has never been specified what tracks on the album, if any, originated during the sessions of Bowie's 1984 album Tonight (that album's co-producer, Hugh Padgham, has recalled that Bowie and Pop collaborated on some songs that Bowie ultimately rejected for inclusion on Tonight).

In 1990, Pop credited Bowie for "[setting] up a good framework for me to tell my story in a way that people could hear. It got on the radio. At times we got a little too meticulous in the studio. But 'Shades,' 'Winners and Losers,' 'Cry for Love' and 'Wild Child' sum up my story at the time."

== Release and reception ==
Professional ratings
Review scores
Source	Rating
AllMusic	2.5/5 stars
Chicago Tribune	2.5/4 stars
Christgau's Record Guide	C+
The Encyclopedia of Popular Music	3/5 stars
The Great Rock Discography	6/10
The Rolling Stone Album Guide	2.5/5 stars
Spin Alternative Record Guide	5/10

Described by AllMusic as "the most calculatedly commercial album of Iggy's career", Blah-Blah-Blah was certified gold in Canada (more than 50,000 copies sold). In the U.S. it peaked at No. 75 on Billboard's Top 200 Albums chart. Rolling Stone's contemporary review complained of a "nagging homogeneity to side one" but continued that "even at its most familiar, Blah-Blah-Blah is as spiritually outraged and emotionally direct as commercial pop gets these days". The same magazine also described the song "Cry for Love" as "a ripping fusion of classic Iggy rage, Bowie cabaret and unexpected romantic vulnerability". New Musical Express critic Don Watson described it as a fine if predictable album of "Adulted Orientated Decadence" geared towards the CD format, and that, unlike contemporary Rolling Stones, "it never sounds desperate, only sad." In The Village Voice, Robert Christgau dismissed Pop for "copping to conscience".

Retrospectively, Mark Deming of AllMusic considers Blah Blah Blah to be "the most calculatedly commercial album of Iggy's career", eschewing the art rock of Pop's earlier collaboration with Bowie, The Idiot, for a slick, "very '80s" pop sound "dominated by preprogrammed percussion and swirling keyboards." Though he highlights a couple of songs for being memorable, Deming regards the overall album as one of Pop's least interesting and most dated. Greg Kot of The Chicago Tribune deems it a "sanitized reunion with Bowie", while Mark Coleman of The New Rolling Stone Album Guide (2004) deemed it a slick Bowie reunion which "mysteriously fails to spark either participants' batteries."

In 2016, Phil Freeman of Stereogum ranked Blah-Blah Blah as the sixth best Iggy Pop record. Despite considering it as "a nakedly commercial '80s rock album" slathered in synths and programmed drums, Freeman feels the songs are "actually really good, and it's not that hard to get past the initially dated-seeming production, especially not now that similar retro sounds have taken over the world of indie music. This is an album that's overdue for reassessment and celebration." Trouser Press reasoned that the album is "a strange and sometimes mainstream-sounding maelstrom of styles, but the lyrics — thoughtful personal reflections on various topics — provide at least intellectual cohesiveness."

Classic Rock comment that, despite "Real Wild Child" being Pop's first mainstream success in years, "his safe-as-milk new image and his art-poppy new songs had strayed so far away from the rabid Stooge of old", leading him to abandon that style in favor of anthemic heavy metal for his next album, Instinct (1988).

== Singles ==
"Real Wild Child" reached No. 27 on Billboard's Mainstream Rock charts and became Pop's first Top 10 hit in the UK. The song was featured on the soundtrack for the 1988 film Crocodile Dundee II and the 1990 film Pretty Woman, also both Problem Child films and has been the opening theme of the Australian ABC TV music block rage by using snippets along with Johnny O'Keefe's "Wild One" since its launch in 1987. Other singles and videos from the album included "Cry for Love", "Isolation" and "Shades", with "Cry for Love" reaching No. 19 on Billboard's Hot Dance Music chart and No. 34 on the Mainstream Rock charts.

== Track listing ==
All tracks are written by Iggy Pop and David Bowie, except where noted.

Side one
No.	Title	Writer(s)	Length
1.	"Real Wild Child (Wild One)"	Johnny O'Keefe; Johnny Greenan; Dave Owens	3:38
2.	"Baby, It Can't Fall"		4:14
3.	"Shades" (original CD version; LP is 5:17)		5:57
4.	"Fire Girl"	Pop; Steve Jones	3:33
5.	"Isolation"		4:37

Side two
No.	Title	Writer(s)	Length
1.	"Cry for Love"	Pop; Jones	4:28
2.	"Blah-Blah-Blah"		4:32
3.	"Hideaway"		5:01
4.	"Winners & Losers"	Pop; Jones	6:18
5.	"Little Miss Emperor" (CD & Cassette)		3:50
Total length:			46:12

== Alternate versions and remixes ==
- "Cry for Love" (Extended dance version) – 6:58 (also listed as Extended remix with a runtime of 7:05 on some releases)
- "Cry for Love" (7" edit) – 3:30
- "Fire Girl" (Single remix) – 6:54
- "Blah-Blah-Blah" (Live; B-side of "Fire Girl" single) – 4:48
- "Real Wild Child (Wild One)" (Single mix) – 3:30
- "Real Wild Child (Wild One)" (Extended version) – 8:28
- "Shades" (Single / LP version) – 5:17 (This is the version from the original vinyl version of the LP. It replaces the regular CD version on the Complete A&M Recordings collection, its first digital issue)
- "Baby, It Can't Fall" (Extended remix; B-side of "Shades" single) – 6:10

There are demo versions of some songs in circulation online. "Fire Girl" features David Bowie's backing vocals far more audible than in the album.

== Personnel ==
Credits are adapted from the album's liner notes.

- Iggy Pop – lead vocals
- Kevin Armstrong – guitar, backing vocals
- Erdal Kızılçay – synthesizer, bass guitar, drums, string arrangements, backing vocals
- Steve Jones – guitar solo on "Cry for Love"
- David Bowie – backing vocals

Production

- David Bowie – producer, mixing
- David Richards – producer, engineer, mixing
- Nick Egan – art direction, design
- Michael Halsband – cover photography

== Charts ==
Chart performance for Blah-Blah-Blah
Chart (1986)	Peak position
Australian Albums (Kent Music Report)	34
Dutch Albums (Album Top 100)	52
German Albums (Offizielle Top 100)	51
New Zealand Albums (RMNZ)	19
Swedish Albums (Sverigetopplistan)	3
Swiss Albums (Schweizer Hitparade)	17
UK Albums (OCC)	43
US Billboard Top Pop Albums	75

== Certifications ==
Certifications for Blah-Blah-Blah
Region	Certification	Certified units/sales
Canada (Music Canada)	Gold	50,000^{^}
^{^} Shipments figures based on certification alone.
