= American Caesar (album) =

Studio album by Iggy Pop
- Released: 7 September 1993
- Recorded: October 1992–February 1993
- Studios: Kingsway Studio, New Orleans and Bearsville Studios, New York, United States
- Genres: Hard rock; grunge
- Length: 71:32
- Label: Virgin
- Producer: Malcolm Burn

Iggy Pop chronology
Brick by Brick (1990)	American Caesar (1993)	Naughty Little Doggie (1996)

Singles from American Caesar
- 1. "Wild America" Released: 1993; 2. "Louie Louie" Released: 1993; 3. "Beside You" Released: 1994

American Caesar is the tenth studio album by American rock singer Iggy Pop, released on 7 September 1993 on Virgin Records.

== Production ==
After the success of Brick by Brick, Pop opted to continue with that album's lyrical themes while toughening up the musical foundation. The album is often considered one of his stronger 1990s albums.

Videos were made for "Wild America" and "Beside You", and the album has a cover of the 1960s standard "Louie Louie" (made famous by the Kingsmen) for which Pop wrote his own set of politically fueled lyrics.

== Release ==
The first single from the album, "Wild America", reached number 25 on Modern Rock Tracks on October 16, 1993, spending a total of three weeks in the charts.

== Musical style ==
In allusion to the sound of American Caesar, Stephen Thomas Erlewine proclaimed the record a "grungy detour".

== Critical reception ==
Professional ratings
Review scores
Source	Rating
AllMusic	4/5 stars
The Encyclopedia of Popular Music	3/5 stars
The Independent	(favourable)
NME	7/10
Rolling Stone	4/5 stars
(The New) Rolling Stone Album Guide	2/5 stars
Select	4/5 medals

Upon release, Melody Maker published a favorable review, saying it was "a glowing testament to the incisive raw power of one of rock's greatest minds, back on the razor-edge of innovation again".

In a retrospective review, Mark Demming of AllMusic called the album "an overlooked masterpiece."

== Track listing ==
All tracks composed by Iggy Pop, except where noted.

1. "Character" (Pop, Eric Schermerhorn) – 1:07
2. "Wild America" (Pop, Schermerhorn) – 5:52
3. "Mixin' the Colors" – 4:49
4. "Jealousy" – 6:04
5. "Hate" – 6:56
6. "It's Our Love" – 4:09
7. "Plastic & Concrete" – 2:55
8. "Fuckin' Alone" (Pop, Eric Schermerhorn) – 4:56
9. "Highway Song" – 3:44
10. "Beside You" (Steve Jones, Pop) – 4:29
11. "Sickness" – 3:15
12. "Boogie Boy" – 4:53
13. "Perforation Problems" – 3:15
14. "Social Life" – 4:12
15. "Louie Louie" (Richard Berry) – 3:47
16. "Caesar" (Pop, Eric Schermerhorn) – 7:09
17. "Girls of N.Y." – 4:15

B-sides and alternate versions

- "Les Amants" (Les Rita Mitsouko featuring Iggy Pop; B-Side to "Beside You" single) – 5:16
- "Louie Louie" (Live; B-Side to "Beside You" single) – 5:32
- "Beside You" (Acoustic version; B-Side to "Beside You" single) – 3:52
- "Evil California" (Annie Ross & The Low Note Quintet featuring Iggy Pop; B-Side to "Beside You" single)
- "Home" (Live at the Feile Festival Summer 1993; B-Side to "Beside You" single) – 4:10
- "Mixin' The Colours" (Spanish version; B-Side to "Louie Louie" single) – 4:10
- "Wild America" (Radio edit)
- "Credit Card" (B-Side to "Wild America" single) – 2:25
- "Come Back Tomorrow" (B-Side to "Wild America" single) – 5:08
- "My Angel" (B-Side to "Wild America" single) – 4:10

== Personnel ==
- Iggy Pop – guitar, vocals
- Eric Schermerhorn – guitar
- Malcolm Burn – guitar, keyboards, harmonica
- Hal Cragin – bass
- Larry Mullins – drums, percussion
- Jay Joyce – guitar on "Wild America" & "Mixin' the Colours"
- Bill Dillon – "atmospheric" guitar on "Mixin' the Colours"
- Darryl Johnson – percussion on "Mixin' the Colours"
- Henry Rollins – backing vocals on "Wild America"
- Katell Keineg – backing vocals on "Mixin' the Colours"
- Lisa Germano – backing vocals on "Beside You"

Technical

- Mark Howard – recording
- George Cowan – engineer
- Trina Shoemaker – engineer
- Todd Vos – engineer
- Paul Mahern – engineer

== Charts ==
Chart performance for American Caesar
Chart (1993)	Peak position
Australian Albums (ARIA)	29
Austrian Albums (Ö3 Austria)	35
Dutch Albums (Album Top 100)	81
German Albums (Offizielle Top 100)	64
New Zealand Albums (RMNZ)	39
Swedish Albums (Sverigetopplistan)	2
Swiss Albums (Schweizer Hitparade)	35
UK Albums (Official Charts)	43
