= Instinct (Iggy Pop album) =

Studio album by Iggy Pop
- Released: 20 June 1988 (UK)
- Recorded: 1988
- Studio: Sorcerer Sound and B.C. Studio in New York City
- Genre: Heavy metal; hard rock; glam metal
- Length: 43:38
- Label: A&M; Universal Special Products
- Producer: Bill Laswell

Iggy Pop chronology
Blah-Blah-Blah (1986)	Instinct (1988)	Brick by Brick (1990)

Singles from Instinct
- 1. "Cold Metal" Released: 1988; 2. "High on You" Released: 1988; 3. "Easy Rider" Released: 1988 (Germany only)

Instinct is the eighth studio album by American rock singer Iggy Pop. It was released in June 1988 by A&M Records. After the relative commercial success of Blah Blah Blah, A&M expected another hit record from Pop; however, he instead decided to go with a heavy and hard-rocking sound for the follow-up album. Instinct features Sex Pistols guitarist Steve Jones, who co-wrote four of the album's songs with Pop, and was produced by Bill Laswell.

== Release ==
Professional ratings
Review scores
Source	Rating
AllMusic	2/5 stars
Chicago Tribune	2/4 stars
Robert Christgau	C+
The Encyclopedia of Popular Music	2/5 stars
Rolling Stone	3/5 stars
(The New) Rolling Stone Album Guide	2/5 stars

The album performed poorly in the US, peaking at number 110 on the Billboard 200 chart. The first single from the album, "Cold Metal," charted at number 37 on mainstream rock charts and earned Pop a Grammy Award nomination for Best Hard Rock/Metal performance in 1989. Except for a few plays of "Cold Metal" the album was largely ignored by commercial rock radio. A&M released videos for "Cold Metal" and "High on You."

== Legacy ==
The album was ranked number 69 on Kerrang!s "100 Greatest Heavy Metal Albums of All Time" list.

The song "Cold Metal" was briefly played in the 1990 science fiction-horror film Hardware, which also featured Iggy Pop as the voice of Angry Bob, a radio DJ.

== Track listing ==
All tracks are written by Iggy Pop, except where noted.

No.	Title	Writer(s)	Length
1.	"Cold Metal"		3:27
2.	"High on You"		4:48
3.	"Strong Girl"	Steve Jones, Pop	5:04
4.	"Tom Tom"		3:17
5.	"Easy Rider"	Jones, Pop	4:54
6.	"Power & Freedom"	Jones, Pop	3:53
7.	"Lowdown"		4:30
8.	"Instinct"		4:12
9.	"Tuff Baby"		4:27
10.	"Squarehead"	Jones, Pop	5:06
Total length:			43:38

== Alternate versions ==
- "Tuff Baby" (12" version released on "High on You" single) – 6:40
- "Tuff Baby" (Dub version) – 5:18
- "High On You" (7" edit) – 4:33
- "Cold Metal" (Rock version) – 5:05
- "Cold Metal" (Dub version) – 4:10

== Personnel ==
Musicians

- Iggy Pop – vocals
- Steve Jones – guitar
- Seamus Beaghen – keyboards
- Leigh Foxx – bass
- Paul Garisto – drums

Technical

- Bill Laswell – producer
- Robert Musso – tracking engineer
- Martin Bisi – vocal engineer
- Jason Corsaro – mixing engineer
- Howie Weinberg – mastering
- Nicky Skopelitis – keyboard programming
- Jeff Bova – keyboard programming
- Gary Grimshaw – cover design
- Donald Krieger – cover graphics
- Paul McAlpine – cover photography

== Charts ==
Chart performance for Instinct
Chart (1988)	Peak position
German Albums (Offizielle Top 100)	54
New Zealand Albums (RMNZ)	28
Swedish Albums (Sverigetopplistan)	20
Swiss Albums (Schweizer Hitparade)	28
UK Albums (OCC)	61
US Billboard 200	110
