= 45 RPM: The Singles of The The =

Greatest hits album by the The
- Released: 21 May 2002
- Recorded: Various
- Genre: Rock
- Length: 60:35 (CD1); 61:31 (CD2); 122:06 (Total)
- Label: Epic/Legacy
- Producers: Matt Johnson, James Eller, Clive Langer, Warne Livesey, Roli Mosimann, Mike Thorne, Alan Winstanley

The The chronology
NakedSelf (2000)	45 RPM: The Singles of The The (2002)	Ensoulment (2024)

45 RPM is a collection of songs by the The. 45 RPM was released in 2002. All the songs were 24-bit digitally remastered to "reveal the full richness and complexity of the original recordings". The album was also released as a limited hardback 2-CD set. The second CD contains eight extended remixes.

== Reception ==
The album was met with mixed to positive reception, with many praising frontman and sole consistent member Matt Johnson's musical and lyrical capabilities, but found the production on some songs very dated and were also unsatisfied with the absence of material from Johnson's debut album Burning Blue Soul (1981).

Ned Raggett of AllMusic praised the compilation for being "a handy and sometimes revelatory compilation of many of Johnson's best moments in his various incarnations" but felt "the only misstep is the lack of anything from the debut Burning Blue Soul" and summarised the album "as both of its time and blatantly reacting against it, often resulting in a fascinating tension that at its best is really distinct music and at its worst can be flailing."

Joe Tangari of Pitchfork called the songs " almost painfully dated to the 1980s, with cavernous echo on the snares, thin digital synth sounds, and massed female backing vocals," but believed the "sound is also clear enough to reveal Johnson's inventiveness as an arranger and composer", and dismissed the second disc as "fairly inconsequential". Mark Reed of Drowned in Sound praised the album for managing "to traverse almost every human emotion. Except optimism." and called the messages within the songs "groundbreaking stuff", though he was also critical of the production choices for some songs, finding them to be very dated.

Professional ratings
Review scores
Source	Rating
Allmusic	4.5/5 stars

== Track listing ==
=== Disc one ===
1. "Uncertain Smile" (new edit of original version)
2. "Perfect" (original version)
3. "Sweet Bird of Truth" (new edit)
4. "Infected"
5. "Heartland" (new edit)
6. "Armageddon Days (Are Here Again)" (new edit)
7. "The Beat(en) Generation"
8. "Dogs of Lust"
9. "Slow Emotion Replay"
10. "Love is Stronger than Death"
11. "This Is the Day" (Dis-infected version) (a.k.a. "That Was The Day")
12. "I Saw the Light"
13. "December Sunlight (Cried Out)" (new version)
14. "Pillar Box Red"
15. "Deep Down Truth"

=== Disc two ===
1. "Uncertain Smile (12" remix)"
2. "Perfect (12" remix)"
3. "Sweet Bird of Truth (12" remix)"
4. "Infected (12" remix)"
5. "Armageddon Days (DNA Remix)"
6. "Violence of Truth (Remix)"
7. "Gravitate to Me (12" remix)"
8. "Dogs of Lust (Foetus Spermicide Remix)"
