= Slow Emotion Replay =

1993 single by The The

Single by The The

from the album Dusk
- Released: 5 April 1993
- Recorded: 1992–1993
- Genre: Alternative rock
- Length: 3:55
- Label: Epic
- Songwriter: Matt Johnson

The The singles chronology
"Dogs of Lust" (1993)	"Slow Emotion Replay" (1993)	"Love Is Stronger Than Death" (1993)

"Slow Emotion Replay" is a single by English rock band The The. It was released as the band's second single from their fourth studio album Dusk (1993) and reached number 35 in the UK Singles chart. It was the 94th best-selling single in Iceland in 1993.

== Music video ==
The music video was directed by Tim Pope, choosing to make it into an "inadvertent documentary", with the lyrics "Everybody knows what's going wrong with the world but I don't even know what's going on in myself" inspiring him to pursue this idea and go around New York asking people what they felt was going wrong with the world. Pope said this "invoked many strange answers" from the people they encountered, with them settling on a man they interviewed in a bar on Houston Street as the one to feature in the video.

== Track listing ==
All tracks are written by Matt Johnson.

No.	Title	Length
1.	"Slow Emotion Replay"	3:56
2.	"Scenes From 'Arctic Twilight'"	8:51

== Personnel ==
- Matt Johnson – lead vocals, electric guitar, acoustic guitar, keyboards
- Johnny Marr – electric guitar, harmonica, backing vocals
- James Eller – bass guitar
- David Palmer – drums

== Slow Emotion Replayed ==
"Slow Emotion Replayed"

Single by The The
- Released: 11 July 2025
- Recorded: 2025
- Studio: Studio Cinéola, London
- Length: 3:56
- Label: earMusic; Cinéola
- Songwriter: Matt Johnson
- Producer: Matt Johnson

The The singles chronology
"Risin Above The Need / Where Do We Go When We Die" (2024)	"Slow Emotion Replayed" (2025)

The The released a re-recorded version of the song titled, "Slow Emotion Replayed" which was physically released on 11 July 2025 with limited stock.

It features the lineup that performed on The Comeback Special (2021) and Ensoulment (2024). Its sound differs largely from the original as the band felt that it did not sound strong enough when rehearsing for their live shows on the Ensouled Tour and decided to attempt recreating the song in order to keep the track on the set list, with Matt Johnson playing it on the Omnichord and the other members playing the rest of the instruments. The studio version was recorded in Johnson's personal studio, Studio Cinéola in London.

=== Release ===
The sleeve design features more previously-unpublished artwork by Johnson's late brother Andy Dog Johnson, much like all of the band's releases since his death in 2016.

The single was digitally released on 6 June 2025, without any additional tracks. A limited edition 7″ vinyl single and exclusive limited edition CD single were available on 11 July 2025.

The release includes a new exclusive B-side called "Crows Commotion Displayed" and four other songs that only feature on the CD release. These were originally released on the 7" vinyl singles as b-sides released by the band from 2020–2024, making it their first appearance on the CD format.

=== Track listing ===
CD

All tracks are written by Matt Johnson.

No.	Title	Length
1.	"Slow Emotion Replayed"	3:56
2.	"Crow Commotion Displayed"	4:03
3.	"Frozen Clouds"	3:34
4.	"Mycelium Muse"	4:09
5.	"When Is The Heart Of Waiting"	4:15
6.	"Velvet Muscle Scream"	3:45

7" vinyl

No.	Title	Length
1.	"Slow Emotion Replayed"	3:56
2.	"Crow Commotion Displayed"	4:03

=== Personnel ===
- Matt Johnson - vocals, Omnichord
- Barrie Cadogan - electric guitar and backing vocals
- James Eller - bass
- Gillian Glover - backing vocals
