= Ensoulment (album) =

Studio album by the The
- Released: 6 September 2024
- Studios: Studio Cinéola, London; Real World Studios, Bath
- Genre: Post-punk
- Length: 45:20
- Labels: Cinéola; earMusic
- Producers: Warne Livesey; Matt Johnson

The The chronology
The Comeback Special: Live at Royal Albert Hall (2021)	Ensoulment (2024)	Slow Emotion Replayed (2025)

Singles from Ensoulment
- 1. "Cognitive Dissident" Released: 17 May 2024; 2. "Linoleum Smooth to the Stockinged Foot" Released: 11 June 2024; 3. "Some Days I Drink My Coffee By the Grave of William Blake" Released: 29 August 2024

Ensoulment is the seventh studio album by the English rock band the The, released on 6 September 2024 on Cinéola and earMusic. It was the first album by the group in over twenty years, with NakedSelf (2000) being the last official studio album released, though singer/songwriter and sole constant member Matt Johnson had composed film scores during this gap. It was produced by Johnson and returning producer Warne Livesey, who produced previous albums Infected (1986) and Mind Bomb (1989).

The album was critically acclaimed upon its release, and would be the band's first top 20 album since Dusk in 1993, peaking at number 19 on the UK Albums Chart.

The term ensoulment refers to the experience when a being gains a soul.

Many of the songs tackle politically charged themes familiar in the The's discography, with the album's themes also being informed by the modern advancements such as the rise of AI and social media's influence on information and mental health. Johnson said he was reflecting the times, saying the album themes are "dealing with the rise of AI and intimacy in an age of alienation. I aim to reflect the world as I see it."

== Background ==
The The were inactive for over twenty years after they released their sixth studio album, NakedSelf, in 2000, but by the release of the album, the band had been falling apart. The death of his younger brother Eugene in 1990 and a shift in the music industry, which Johnson perceived to be a higher demand for successful singles but little interest in full-length albums, caused Johnson to halt his career, revealing he "didn't even pick up a guitar for the next seven years". He pinned it down to "undigested grief" and also suffering from a relationship breaking down in New York, all of which caused him to lose faith in his future, making him see his music career as "shallow and irrelevant."

His first musical contribution since NakedSelf was the film score for Tony in 2010, which would follow with three more scores credited under the The. He revealed during this time he "was always writing words, but could never finish anything", having "hundreds of pages of notes. I'd get a nice chord, but then nothing."

In 2012, his older brother Andy Dog Johnson, who was responsible for the majority of the The's sleeve designs and illustrations, was diagnosed with a brain tumour, eventually dying in 2016. His brother's death caused Johnson to reconsider his career in music, wishing to not repeat the result of his younger brother's death which ended his career before. The band released the stand-alone single "We Can't Stop What's Coming" in 2017, which was written in memory of Johnson's brother.

They would follow this with a tour in 2018 in the UK and US on The Comeback Special shows, which saw the band perform their songs from across the years in a retrospective celebration of their career, and proved successful. Unfortunately, only days before the tour kicked off, Johnson's father died, which made performing very difficult for him. He chose to not quit the tour for financial reasons and the fact that his father wouldn't have wished for him to quit his career. They released their performance at the Royal Albert Hall as the live album The Comeback Special: Live at the Royal Albert Hall in 2021, and released a movie of the same name. He opened a new record label called Cinéola and home studio called Studio Cinéola, which he said made his creative process "very free", and also made a partnership deal with earMusic.

== Recording ==
The album began to be pieced together during lockdown, with Johnson beginning to write the majority of the songs on his writing bureau, that once belonged to his deceased father, whom inherited it from Johnson's grandfather. This made him feel more emotionally connected within the creative process, along with the fact that the desk had also been in his deceased brother, Andy's room for many years. He sketched out the demoes for the songs on acoustic guitar in his home. He had a routine that he stuck to strictly when it came to writing the lyrics for the album where he "would get up at about 5 every morning, put on a little pot of Japanese tea, and write from 5 'til 10" which he found to be very peaceful and undisturbed. After this, he would work with the same band that performed for The Comeback Special shows as Johnson enjoyed playing with them, and called them "obsessive" about creating music and caring about "their sound". The band rehearsed at Johnson's home, and they would sit in a circle on wooden chairs "almost knee to knee" playing at a "very low level acoustically", in order to build upon dynamics and assign the parts within the songs, they would then demo the songs and rehearse. He chose to rehearse this way as an attempt to replicate the sound of the live performances on The Comeback Special shows. They began recording the songs at Peter Gabriel's Real World Studios in Bath, where they recorded most of it live in six days, spending ten hours a day recording, with some overdubs. They also recorded themselves in the same way they rehearsed so they could watch each other perform, which Johnson believes added "quite a warm, live feeling", to the album.

He found the experience of recording the album "a lot of fun and laughter and creativity—it's a much happier situation for me than I was when I was in my twenties." The album took six months in total to be written, rehearsed and recorded.

== Composition and themes ==
The album is meant to explore "the meaning of what it is to be human in the 21st century". Johnson also felt that the album's sound was reminiscent of the The's album Dusk (1993) with both being melodic and addressing bereavement of loved ones.

The album opener, "Cognitive Dissident", noted for its heavily political tone, addressed what Johnson observed within media misinformation, feeling "The truth is now so ridiculed and disbelieved and marginalised. We live in a society where the politicians lie, the media lie – about everything, all the blooming time. You can't believe a word. That's why the trust in politicians is on the floor.", and that "Lies have become the currency of the day."

The song "Some Days I Drink My Coffee By the Grave of William Blake", Johnson's favourite song on the album, is named after something Johnson does, making it the most literally titled. Despite saying it wasn't a good title, he justified it by saying "I reference a couple of William Blake things, like at the start of the second verse, which is "The green and pleasant land", and I put "Greedy, unpleasant land." and also said that it was "part of a family of songs that would include "Flesh and Bones", "Heartland", "Pillar Box Red" "The Beat(en) Generation" and "Perfect", which are set in London and are quite political about London and Britain generally.", he also linked the song to misinformation and censorship. He also said that the song had started to be created ten years before the album, but "never got beyond the first chorus".

"Zen & the Art of Dating" covers themes of "intimacy in the age of alienation, and the rise of AI" which are both present themes on other songs in the album. He noted the song's message was a positive one, despite its darker subject matter, explaining "the point I'm trying to make in the song is by becoming more whole in oneself – happier, healthier within one's own soul and heart – then one is not searching for love to make one whole. But by that process, that's when, paradoxically, love then comes into you because you're not searching for something: you already possess it, and then it becomes attracted to you." He felt the first two verses were darker, with the first being sung from a female perspective and the second being sung from a male perspective with the third verse serving as an overview of the concept, with the final line being the positive message, calling the song "black comedy". "Kissing the Ring of POTUS" was written from Johnson's view on "the current state of American politics and the neocon, neoliberal takeover that's happened over the past few decades. It's the lobbyists, the pro-war politicians, and endless privatizations."

There are also more personal songs, such as "Linoleum Smooth to the Stockinged Foot", which documents Johnson's experience in hospital in 2020 shortly after The Comeback Special performances, when he had an acute throat infection which he described as "like having a small python wrapped around your windpipe". He needed urgent surgery but was hesitant as he feared it could cost his singing voice, but was assured he had a highly trained surgeon and that he could risk his life if he did not have the surgery. Despite his initial fears, he came out of the surgery unharmed with instruction by the doctor to not sing for six months after the surgery, and joked in a Facebook post that "I'm not sure if I'll sound like Howlin' Wolf or Tiny Tim! Hopefully I'll still sound like myself." He found the experience very surreal, recalling "A lot of the hospital was in darkness, cold, everyone masked up", but due to him being put on morphine for pain relief, he faced side effects of the drug and had convinced himself that he had already died and saw the hospital as "a halfway house". He said his instinct was "to get moving", so he began "pacing the wards in surgical stockings with a drip, thinking: 'I've got to get a song out of this." It was the last song to be recorded on the album and features no other band members other than Johnson and the session musicians. He felt that it was "the one that stands out" musically to the other songs for the fact it lacked the other members. "I Want to Wake Up with You" covers Johnson's experiences with various relationships throughout his life, with its message specifically referring to the "moment just before" two people fall in love and have "a recognition on both sides of this attraction, and the walls dissolving between them." "Life After Life" refers to mortality while "Where Do We Go When We Die" is written in memory of his father. He found this song and the closing track, "A Rainy Day in May" the most emotional to write and record.

== Release ==
The album was preceded by three singles, "Cognitive Dissident" on 17 May 2024, "Linoleum Smooth to the Stockinged Foot" on 11 June 2024, "Some Days I Drink My Coffee By the Grave of William Blake" 29 August 2024 with accompanying videos directed by Tim Pope.

The album was released on 6 September on all formats, with the special editions featuring previously unreleased works by Andy Dog Johnson in a 32-page booklet on the vinyl and CD releases. He also designed the art that would be used for the covers for all of the singles and the album.

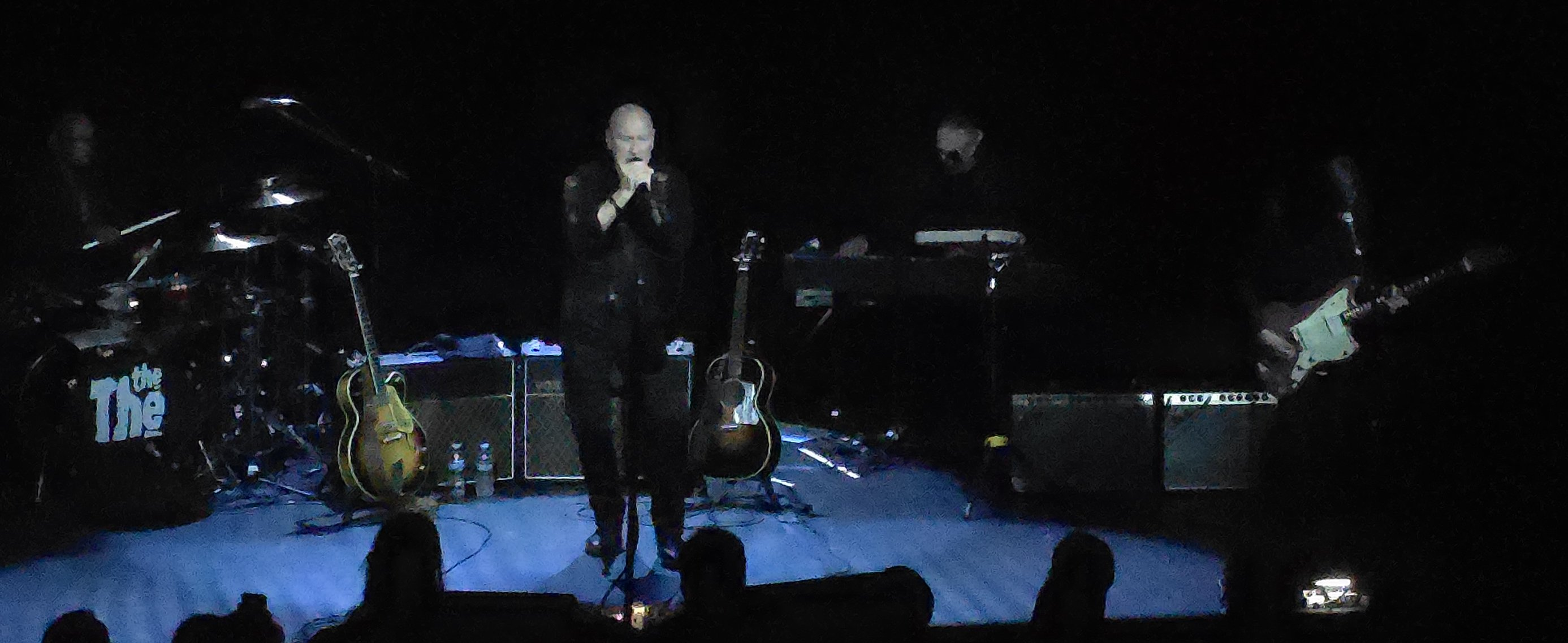
The The performing in 2024 on the Ensouled tour

== Tour ==
The band began promoting the album on a world tour called the Ensouled Tour which started in September 2024 having four shows in the UK from 25 September to 30 September. They began another leg in June 2025, which will see them perform in Europe, the US, Australia and New Zealand. The sets are made up of two parts, the first featuring the whole album being played live, while the second serving as a retrospective on the band's career.

== Reception ==
Professional ratings
Aggregate scores
Source	Rating
Metacritic	79/100
Review scores
Source	Rating
AllMusic	4/5 stars
Mojo	4/5 stars
Uncut	3/5 stars
The Line of Best Fit	7/10
Record Collector	5/5 stars
PopMatters	7/10

The album was critically acclaimed upon release. At Metacritic, which assigns a normalised rating out of 100 to reviews from mainstream publications, the album received an average score of 79, based on 8 reviews. Classic Rock observed, "Sound-wise there's a gravelly, mature, post-punk bluesiness about the The in 2024, some of the blackness of Johnny Cash. But there are silvery moments of hopelessness."

Matt Collar of AllMusic praised the opening track "Cognitive Dissident" for setting "the album's ominous yet satirical tone from the start on "Cognitive Dissent", decrying the reality-warping nature of the internet, singing "Reality curated/Every place you thought you belonged/Everything you thought you knew is wrong." and concluded, "At turns incisive and deeply felt, Ensoulment is more than a welcome return for Johnson and the The."

James McNair of Mojo called it "Sustenance for anyone who feels popular music currently lacks political/philosophical engagement, the The's first studio album in 25 years finds Matt Johnson updating his ever-pointed ruminations on Perfidious Albion/our hot rails to hell." He concluded "It's not pretty, per se, but Ensoulment has a dark, elegiac beauty, suitably sickly guitars (Cognitive Dissident) and Johnson's desiccated baritone vying with electric piano smudges, horns, upright bass and upright piano." Daniel Dylan Wray of Uncut praised Johnson's vocals and the production, but added "When Johnson tackles bigger, broader, societal and political issues, though, things don't quite hit with the same punch, clarity or warmth." He concluded "Regardless of a few wrong turns, it's wonderful to have such a natural songwriting talent as Johnson back on record again. It's just a shame he doesn't always seem to realise that the most interesting soul he could mine here is his own."

Simon Heavisides of The Line of Best Fit felt it "reconfirms Johnson's ability to shift swiftly from the personal to the political or to just erase the boundaries altogether, if they ever existed." Record Collector praised its themes and the execution of the lyrics, saying "As an artist known for rallying against the injustices of the world, Johnson could have created an album of unremitting gloom given the current state of global affairs. It's to his credit that Ensoulment is a welcome – and hopeful – return from a man who obviously still has much to offer. Just don't leave it so long next time." John Bergstrom of PopMatters felt the album's strength lied in "an enhanced sense of wisdom and perspective" citing songs such as ""I Want to Wake Up with You", "Life After Life", and "Where Do We Go When We Die?" to "reveal a willingness to tackle Big Questions directly, whereas, in the past, Johnson would often hedge emotions with irony and frustration."

== Track listing ==
All tracks are written by Matt Johnson.

No.	Title	Length
1.	"Cognitive Dissident"	3:06
2.	"Some Days I Drink My Coffee By the Grave of William Blake"	4:03
3.	"Zen & the Art of Dating"	4:30
4.	"Kissing the Ring of POTUS"	3:33
5.	"Life After Life"	3:12
6.	"I Want to Wake Up with You"	4:00
7.	"Down by the Frozen River"	3:33
8.	"Risin' Above the Need"	3:46
9.	"Linoleum Smooth to the Stockinged Foot"	3:53
10.	"Where Do We Go When We Die?"	4:02
11.	"I Hope You Remember (The Things I Can't Forget)"	3:38
12.	"A Rainy Day in May"	3:59
Total length:		45:20

== Personnel ==
=== The The ===
- Matt Johnson – vocals, electric guitar, acoustic guitar, tambourine, bass guitar, handclaps, production
- James Eller – bass, body percussion (tracks: 1–8, 10–12)
- DC Collard – keyboards (tracks: 1–8, 11, 12)
- Earl Harvin – drums, body percussion (tracks: 1–8, 10–12)
- Barrie Cadogan – electric guitar, backing vocals, acoustic guitar (tracks: 1–8, 10–12)

=== Additional personnel ===
- Warne Livesey – co-production and engineering
- Gillian Glover – backing vocals (tracks: 1–5, 7, 9, 10)
- Terry Edwards – horns (tracks: 4, 5, 7, 9)
- Sonya Cullingford – fiddle (tracks: 9, 10, 12)
- Danny Cummings – percussion, handclaps (tracks 5, 9, 10)
- Andy Dog – artwork
- Gerald Jenkins – photography

== Charts ==
Chart	Peak Position
UK Album Charts (OCC)	19
Austrian Albums (Ö3 Austria)	15
German Albums (Offizielle Top 100)	11
Dutch Albums (Album Top 100)	79
Swiss Albums (Schweizer Hitparade)	54
