= Solitude (The The album) =

Remix album by the The
- Released: 1993
- Genre: Alternative rock
- Label: Epic
- Producer: Bruce Lampcov, Matt Johnson

The The chronology
Dusk (1993)	Solitude (1993)	Hanky Panky (1995)

Singles from Solitude
- 1. "Jealous of Youth" Released: 1990

Professional ratings
Review scores
Source	Rating
AllMusic	3/5 stars

Solitude is a US compilation album by the English rock band the The consisting of the two UK EPs Disinfected and Shades of Blue. In addition a remix of "The Violence of Truth" from a limited-edition version of the "Dogs of Lust" single is included.

== Track listing ==
1. "That Was The Day"
2. "Dis-Infected"
3. "Jealous of Youth"
4. "The Violence of Truth" (Remix)
5. "Helpline Operator" (Sick Boy mix)
6. "Another Boy Drowning" (live)
7. "Solitude"
8. "Dolphins"
9. "Dogs of Lust" (Germicide Mix)
