= NakedSelf =

Studio album by The The
- Released: 29 February 2000
- Recorded: New York & London 1999–2000
- Genres: Alternative rock; industrial rock
- Length: 45:38
- Labels: Nothing; Universal
- Producers: Matt Johnson; Bruce Lampcov

The The chronology
Gun Sluts (1997)	NakedSelf (2000)	45 RPM: The Singles of The The (2002)

Alternative cover

Professional ratings
Aggregate scores
Source	Rating
Metacritic	75/100
Review scores
Source	Rating
AllMusic	3/5 stars
The Encyclopedia of Popular Music	3/5 stars
Mojo	3/5 stars
NME	3.5/5 stars
Pitchfork	7.1/10
Rolling Stone	3/5 stars

NakedSelf is the sixth studio album by the English band the The. Released in 2000, it was the band's first album since Hanky Panky (1995) and the first containing original material since Dusk (1993). In terms of sales, it was the band's least successful until that point, peaking at 45 in the UK Albums Chart. It was the last studio album released by the The until the announcement of Ensoulment, released on 6 September 2024.

== Production ==
The album, produced by Bruce Lampcov and Matt Johnson, was recorded in New York City. Johnson decided to make the album without the use of samplers, keyboards, or sequencers. Guitarist Eric Schermerhorn, who had joined the The before the recording of Hanky Panky (replacing Johnny Marr), took an active role alongside Johnson, with co-writing credits on six out of twelve tracks. The band released NakedSelf through Nothing Records after it was deemed by Sony as lacking in commercial value.

== Critical reception ==
NakedSelf was met with "generally favorable" reviews from critics. At Metacritic, which assigns a weighted average rating out of 100 to reviews from mainstream publications, this release received an average score of 75, based on 11 reviews.

Pitchfork wrote that the album "finds Matt Johnson in his element, tackling issues of alienation, global corruption, and urban squalor and decay with potent, more succinct lyrics and some of his most affecting melodies in ages." The Austin Chronicle called the album "a solid return, appropriately dark and seedy when lyrics turn to interpersonal relationships (or the impossibility thereof), as they usually do." The Chicago Tribune wrote: "A modern-day blues album, NakedSelf is steeped in distortion and cynical takes on love and loneliness." The New Zealand Herald wrote that "the musical approach here is certainly effective in its taut, barbed and occasionally bluesy guitar attack with occasional acoustic urges."

== Track listing ==
1. "Boiling Point" (Matt Johnson, Eric Schermerhorn) - 5:48
2. "Shrunken Man" (Matt Johnson) - 4:55
3. "The Whisperers" (Matt Johnson, Eric Schermerhorn) - 3:20
4. "Soul Catcher" (Matt Johnson) - 3:15
5. "Global Eyes" (Matt Johnson) - 4:10
6. "December Sunlight" (Matt Johnson, Eric Schermerhorn) - 3:18
7. "Swine Fever" (Matt Johnson) - 3:39
8. "Diesel Breeze" (Matt Johnson, Eric Schermerhorn) - 2:52
9. "Weather Belle" (Matt Johnson) - 3:47
10. "Voidy Numbness" (Matt Johnson, Eric Schermerhorn) - 4:04
11. "Phantom Walls" (Matt Johnson) - 4:17
12. "Salt Water" (Matt Johnson, Eric Schermerhorn) - 2:13

== Personnel ==
- Matt Johnson – lead vocals, electric guitar, acoustic guitar, baritone guitar, bass guitar, banjo
- Eric Schermerhorn – electric guitar, acoustic guitar, baritone guitar, bass guitar
- Spencer Campbell – bass guitar (tracks 1, 2, 3, 9)
- Earl Harvin – drums (tracks 1, 2, 3, 5, 7, 9)
- Brian MacLeod – drums (track 10)
- Frank Ferrer – drums (track 12)
- Dorit Chrysler – backing vocals (track 5)
- Michelle Amar – backing vocals (track 5)
- Lloyd Cole – backing vocals (track 5)
- Brian Kelly – backing vocals (track 5)

== Charts ==
Chart performance for NakedSelf
Chart (2000)	Peak position
Irish Albums (IRMA)	68
Scottish Albums (Official Charts)	59
UK Albums (Official Charts)	45
