= Dogs of Lust =

1993 single by the The

Single by the The

from the album Dusk
- B-side: "The Violence of Truth" (remix); "Infected" (live); "Jealous of Youth" (live); "Armageddon Days Are Here (Again)" (remix); "Beyond Love" (live)
- Released: 4 January 1993
- Studio: The War Room (London, England)
- Genre: Rock
- Length: 3:09
- Label: Epic
- Songwriter: Matt Johnson
- Producers: Matt Johnson; Bruce Lampcov

The The singles chronology
"Jealous of Youth" (1990)	"Dogs of Lust" (1993)	"Slow Emotion Replay" (1993)

Music video
- "Dogs of Lust" on YouTube

"Dogs of Lust" is a song by English rock band the The. Written by frontman Matt Johnson, who co-produced the track with Bruce Lampcov, the song was released as the lead single from the band's fourth studio album, Dusk, on 4 January 1993. Johnny Marr played the electric guitars and harmonica riff on the song. "Dogs of Lust" became a hit in several countries, peaking at number 25 on the UK singles chart, reaching number two on the US Billboard Modern Rock Tracks chart, and entering the top 20 in Ireland, New Zealand, and Norway. A music video directed by Tim Pope was filmed to promote the single.

== Background and release ==
"Dogs of Lust" marked a change of style for the The, with a lighter tone compared to the band's previous work. The track is a rock song driven by a harmonica played by Johnny Marr. Matt Johnson's vocals on the track were filtered to produce an "unsettling", "desperate", and "almost frighten[ing]" edge. Johnson chose to release "Dogs of Lust" as the lead single from Dusk, as he believed it would provide a good preview of the album's "confessional" themes of lust and loneliness. Epic Records released the song in the United Kingdom on 4 January 1993 across three formats: 7-inch vinyl, 12-inch vinyl, and CD. The B-sides of these releases include remixes of "The Violence of Truth" and "Armageddon Days Are Here (Again)" from Mind Bomb (1989), as well as live versions of "Beyond Love" from Mind Bomb, "Infected" from Infected (1986), and "Jealous of Youth" from the Shades of Blue EP (1990). "Dogs of Lust" was included as third track on Dusk, which was released on 25 January 1993. In Australia, a CD single was issued on 30 January 1993, followed by a cassette single on 8 February.

== Chart performance ==
On 10 January 1993, "Dogs of Lust" debuted at its peak of number 25 on the UK singles chart. It stayed at that position for a second week before descending the chart, totalling four weeks within the top 75. It gave the The their third UK top-10 hit, after "Heartland" in 1986 and "The Beat(en) Generation" in 1989. At the time, it was the band's highest-charting single on the UK chart, until it was surpassed by the Dis-Infected EP, which peaked at number 18 in January 1994. In Ireland, "Dogs of Lust" peaked at number 18 on the Irish Singles Chart on 18 January 1993 and stayed within the top 30 for three weeks. This marked the sixth time that the The had entered the top 30 in Ireland, and it is their second-highest-charting single there after "The Beat(en) Generation", which peaked at number eight. Across Europe, "Dogs of Lust" charted in Norway, where it debuted and peaked at number seven on the VG-lista chart during the third charting period of 1993. Immediately afterwards, the song dropped off the chart. With its combined UK, Irish, and Norwegian sales, the song attained a peak of number 32 on the Eurochart Hot 100 on 30 January 1993.

Outside Europe, "Dogs of Lust" charted in Australia, New Zealand, and the United States. In the US, the song appeared on the Billboard Modern Rock Tracks chart, debuting at number 15 on 23 January 1993 to become that week's highest new entry. The following week, the single jumped to number six, then rose to number four on 6 February. The next week, it ascended to its peak of number two, where it remained for three weeks. Afterwards, the song began dropping down the chart, eventually exiting from number 21 on 17 April after a 12-week run. At the end of the year, Billboard placed the track at number 15 on the Modern Rock Tracks' year-end ranking. On New Zealand's RIANZ Singles Chart, "Dogs of Lust" first appeared at number 30 on 14 February 1993. The following week, it rose to number 16, its peak. The song continued charting for the next four weeks, leaving the top 50 on 28 March. On 25 April, the song re-appeared at number 45, then dropped out of the top 50 for the final time, logging seven weeks on the chart. "Dogs of Lust" entered the top 75 in Australia, where it entered the ARIA Singles Chart on 14 February 1994 and peaked at number 70.

== Music video ==
The music video for "Dogs of Lust" was directed by Tim Pope. It features the band playing the song under yellow and blue lighting. The video was added to MTV's playlists on the week ending 20 February 1993.

== Track listings ==
UK 7-inch single

A. "Dogs of Lust"
B. "The Violence of Truth" (remix)

UK CD1 and 12-inch single; Australian CD single

1. "Dogs of Lust"
2. "The Violence of Truth" (remix)
3. "Infected" (live)

UK CD2

1. "Dogs of Lust"
2. "Jealous of Youth" (live)
3. "Armageddon Days Are Here (Again)" (DNA remix)
4. "Beyond Love" (live)

== Credits and personnel ==
Credits are taken from the UK CD1 liner notes and the Dusk album booklet.

Recording

- Produced at Johnson's home studio
- Recorded live at The War Room (London, England)
- Mixed at The Hit Factory (London, England)
- Mastered in New York City

Personnel

- Matt Johnson – music, words, vocals, electric guitars, production
- Johnny Marr – electric guitars, harmonica
- James Eller – bass guitar
- Vinnie Colaiuta – drums
- Bruce Lampcov – production, recording, mixing, engineering
- Richard "Noz" Norris – assistant recording engineer
- Marc "Boy!" Williams – assistant and additional mixing engineer
- Martin "Max" Heyes – additional mixing engineer
- Howie Weinberg – mastering

== Charts ==
=== Weekly charts ===
Chart (1993)	Peak position
Australia (ARIA)	70
Europe (Eurochart Hot 100)	32
Ireland (IRMA)	18
New Zealand (Recorded Music NZ)	16
Norway (VG-lista)	7
UK Singles (Official Charts)	25
US Modern Rock Tracks (Billboard)	2

=== Year-end charts ===
Chart (1993)	Position
US Modern Rock Tracks (Billboard)	15
