= Eric Schermerhorn =

American guitarist, composer, and voiceover artist

- Born: April 11, 1961 (age 65); Springfield, Massachusetts, U.S.
- Occupations: Musician, composer, voiceover artist
- Instrument: Guitar
- Years active: As musician: 1980–present As voiceover artist: 2011–present

Eric Schermerhorn (/skɜːrˈmərˌhɔːrn/ SKUR-mər-horn; born April 11, 1961) is an American guitarist, composer, and voiceover artist. As a musician, he has worked with David Bowie, Iggy Pop, Ric Ocasek, Richard Butler, The The, They Might Be Giants, Melissa Etheridge, P!nk, Christina Aguilera, Seal, and Sheryl Crow. As a voiceover artist, he has had minor roles in Family Guy and American Dad!.

== Early life ==
Eric Schermerhorn was born on April 11, 1961, in Springfield, Massachusetts. He would spend time listening to his older sister's Beatles records, and those were formative musical experiences in his early childhood. Schermerhorn attributes his keen interest in the electric guitar to an early experience listening to Led Zeppelin's 1969 song "Whole Lotta Love". He first started playing guitar in the summer of 1972, as an 11-year-old going into 6th grade, and constantly practiced in his bedroom as a teenager. He learned how to read guitar tablatures while taking music classes in high school. While attending high school, Schermerhorn was in a band called Crystal Raaven; the band eventually shortened its name to Raaven, but the band was short-lived.

In 1979, Schermerhorn moved to Boston and attended the Berklee College of Music.

== Career ==
In 1980, Schermerhorn formed a band called Ooh-Ah-Ah! with two of his fellow students at Berklee College of Music, lead singer Cinde Lager and bass player Akio Akashi. Akashi had brought a Roland TR-808 drum machine from Tokyo, and Ooh-Ah-Ah! were among its early users. The band was never signed to a label, but they had recording sessions at Syncro Sound in Boston; David Robinson, the drummer for The Cars, produced those demos.

Ooh-Ah-Ah! broke up soon after, and Schermerhorn graduated from Berklee College of Music in 1982. Schermerhorn joined a band called Adventure Set in 1983, which was active until 1985. They were also unsigned, and they released a 4-track EP in 1985, produced by William Garrett. One song from that EP, "Blue Is For Boys", received significant airplay on WBCN.

Cinde Lager and Eric Schermerhorn played together again in another band called East of Eden, which formed in 1986. They were signed to Capitol Records in 1987, and they released one self-titled album in 1989. The album was produced by Roy Thomas Baker (known for his work with Queen and The Cars). They toured with The Psychedelic Furs as a supporting act in autumn 1989, before they broke up in 1990.

When East of Eden broke up, Schermerhorn relocated to New York City, and started finding work as a session guitarist for TV commercials. In spring 1991, another fellow student of Berklee, Reeves Gabrels, called Schermerhorn and asked him to audition for David Bowie's group, Tin Machine. Schermerhorn traveled to Los Angeles to audition, and he ended up touring with Tin Machine on the It's My Life Tour, which lasted from October 5, 1991, to February 17, 1992.

By the time the tour with Tin Machine ended, David Bowie's road manager approached Schermerhorn, letting him know that Iggy Pop was looking for a guitar player, and Schermerhorn agreed. After the tour was over, Bowie asked Schermerhorn which musician he wanted to work with; Schermerhorn modestly replied Chrissie Hynde, knowing she was looking for a guitarist. Through Bowie, he briefly met Hynde in London, where she let him know that if he wanted to work with her, he would have to move to London because she wanted a London-based band. Schermerhorn rejected it, in favor of staying in New York and working with Iggy Pop. He wrote and recorded with Iggy Pop from 1992 to 1995, and his songwriting and guitar work can be heard on the albums American Caesar and Naughty Little Doggie.

Schermerhorn also played on Ric Ocasek's fourth studio album, Quick Change World, released on September 28, 1993. This connection came about through his early association with The Cars' drummer, David Robinson.

Schermerhorn had met Richard Butler when East of Eden toured with The Psychedelic Furs in 1989; through this connection, Butler invited Eric to write and record with his new band, Love Spit Love.

Through a connection with manager and former 'Til Tuesday drummer Michael Hausman, Schermerhorn met Matt Johnson, who was in New York, looking for a guitar player for The The. Schermerhorn remembers meeting Matt in 1993, but he joined to replace Johnny Marr in 1995.

In 1995, through a connection with Robert Quine, Schermerhorn met John Flansburgh and he joined They Might Be Giants. He played with the band until December 1996, and was a lead guitarist for They Might Be Giants on the albums Factory Showroom and Long Tall Weekend.

In 1996, Schermerhorn toured with Paula Cole for a promotional tour, and he appeared in the music video for "Where Have All the Cowboys Gone?".

Schermerhorn moved to Los Angeles, California, in late August 2001. He moved primarily to write and record songs for other artists. There, he formed a music production company called CHIMP, with producer Pete Min; separate from Schermerhorn's songwriting for other artists, CHIMP provided incidental music for television and film until 2012. In 2001, through his connection with record producer Bill Bottrell, Schermerhorn played with Shelby Lynne during a promotional tour.

A connection with Jason Mraz came about through Schermerhorn's publishing company, Kobalt Music, in 2001.

In February 2002, Schermerhorn played with Marianne Faithfull once, at the opening of an exhibit centered around the work of Andy Warhol at the Tate Modern in London.

Schermerhorn had a connection with Linda Perry since 1999, and he frequently collaborated with her, doing session work. His connection with Perry led to him meeting P!nk and Christina Aguilera in 2002. He worked with P!nk on the 2003 album Try This, and he worked with Christina Aguilera on the 2006 album Back To Basics. Schermerhorn's connection with Linda Perry, as well as his connection with Rick Parashar since 2001, led to him working with Melissa Etheridge.

In 2003, through his connection with Earl Harvin while playing in The The, and through a connection with bassist Chris Bruce, Schermerhorn worked with Seal.

In 2005, Schermerhorn's longstanding connection with former The The drummer Brian MacLeod led to him working with Sheryl Crow. In 2009, through a connection with musician Dave Levita, Schermerhorn toured with Lucinda Williams for a year.

When he stopped touring, he decided to focus on recording music for various sessions and raising his children, but he also started working as a voiceover artist, recording from his home studio. As a voice actor, he has found work in the animated sitcoms Family Guy and American Dad!, as well as providing voiceover for The Doctors, and for various advertisements. He has semi-retired from voice acting, though he still provides the occasional recording for friends and acquaintances.

== Personal life ==
Schermerhorn currently resides in Los Angeles with his wife and two children. In 2025, Schermerhorn was listed amongst the industry professionals who had lost their homes due to the January 2025 Southern California wildfires.

== Discography ==
With East of Eden

- East of Eden (1989)

With Christina Aguilera

- Back To Basics (2006)

With David Bowie

- Tin Machine Live: Oy Vey Baby (1992)

With Eagle-Eye Cherry

- Living In The Present Future (2000)

With Iggy Pop

- American Caesar (1993)
- Naughty Little Doggie (1996)

With Jason Mraz

- Waiting For My Rocket To Come (2002)

With John Fischer

- Between The Answers (1985)

With Love Spit Love

- Love Spit Love (1994)

With Maria Gabriela Epúmer and A1

- Señorita Corazon (1998)

With Mono Puff

- It's Fun To Steal (1998)

With P!nk

- Try This (2003)

With Ric Ocasek

- Quick Change World (1993)

With Seal

- Live in Paris (2005)
- One Night To Remember (2006)
- System (2007)

With Sheryl Crow

- Detours (2008)

With The The

- Hanky Panky (1995)
- NakedSelf (2000)

With They Might Be Giants

- Factory Showroom (1996)
- Severe Tire Damage (1998)
- Long Tall Weekend (1999)
