= Infected (The The album) =

Studio album by the The
- Released: 17 November 1986
- Genres: Post-punk; alternative rock
- Length: 40:57
- Labels: Some Bizzare; Epic
- Producers: Warne Livesey; Matt Johnson; Roli Mosimann; Gary Langan

The The chronology
Soul Mining (1983)	Infected (1986)	Mind Bomb (1989)

Singles from Infected
- 1. "Heartland" Released: 4 August 1986; 2. "Infected" Released: 13 October 1986; 3. "Slow Train to Dawn" Released: 12 January 1987; 4. "Sweet Bird of Truth" Released: 11 May 1987

Infected is the second studio album by the English post-punk band the The, released on 17 November 1986 by Some Bizzare and Epic Records. The album produced four UK singles, including the band's best-selling single "Heartland," which reached number 29 in the UK and spent 10 weeks on the chart, "Infected", "Slow Train to Dawn" and "Sweet Bird of Truth". Although Infected only peaked at number 14 on the UK Albums Chart, it remained on the chart for 30 weeks.

== Writing and composition ==
The first single from the album, "Heartland", held particular significance for frontman Matt Johnson. Describing it as "probably the best song I've ever written", he said, "I'm attacking those working class Tories and middle class who still think Britain is on a par economically with France and Germany... I wanted to write a classic song which is basically representative of its time, a record that in 1999 people will put on and it will remind them exactly of this period of time... you know it took 18 months to write on and off because I knew it was the most important song I was writing". It features a harmonica solo by Judd Lander.

"Sweet Bird of Truth" is about the US's military involvement in Middle East politics. Johnson said, "The idea of that single was to provide a musical interpretation of the sort of cultural conflict that occurs when the ultimate Western power takes on the sort of Eastern fundamentalism that you'll find in the Arab nations."

Johnson wanted to release "Sweet Bird of Truth" as the album's first single in April 1986, but the timing coincided with the US bombing of Libya, and because of the song's lyrics critical of American military involvement in the Middle East, CBS were unwilling to release and promote the single. It was eventually released as a low-key limited edition single and deleted on the day of release. Johnson said, "The day I went in to tell them I wanted to release the single, they'd just been told by Special Branch to take their American flags down, since, as an American multi-national, they were a possible target for Libyan bombing. So I prepared a statement for the press, but apparently the [UK national daily newspapers] were told not to print it, because they could then be held responsible if CBS were bombed."

Johnson described "Slow Train to Dawn" as "about the psychological relationship between two people and the weakness of the male in that relationship, and infidelity, which is borne from insecurity and weakness". He admitted that the song was partly autobiographical, saying, "I get myself into a lot of difficult situations. I feel I have to live out what I write about out. I don't feel it's fair if I've never done the things I'm singing about. So I've done everything. I've lived out the lives of the characters." Neneh Cherry sang lead vocals with Johnson on the track.

In Johnson's mind, "Twilight of a Champion" was set in Chicago, despite filming the music video in New York City: "When I wrote the song, I created this scene where I was in this Chicago skyline at the top of a building and had become everything I wanted to become, but had sold my soul. There's the young boy and the old man, and I'm in the middle, between innocence and corruption." Roli Mosimann co-wrote the music for the track, the only composition on the album not to have been completely written by Johnson, and it makes heavy use of the sampling synthesiser Fairlight CMI.

"Mercy Beat" is "essentially about spiritual salvation which is why I wanted to do [the music video for the song] in South America, because of the heavy influence of Catholicism and Americana."

== Infected video film ==
To promote the album, Johnson produced a music video for each track. He divulged his reasons for this unusual form of promotion in an interview with NME:

"I came to a crossroads in my career really. Having not played live for three and a half years and having such a low profile – for instance not having my picture on my sleeves – I decided to raise the whole stakes of the thing and risk becoming known a lot more as a personality, which is not really something I'm keen on."

Johnson and his manager Stevo persuaded CBS Records to advance £350,000 to make the videos, an unprecedented sum for a little-known act. The project began by filming a video for "Heartland" at Greenwich Power Station, directed by Peter Christopherson, and then "Sweet Bird of Truth", directed by Mark Romanek. When Johnson and Christopherson flew to South America to film the videos for "Infected" and "Mercy Beat", events started to spiral out of control. Filming in the Peruvian jungle in Iquitos, Johnson used the services of a local Indian tribe as guides. The Indians introduced Johnson, already an enthusiastic user of drugs, to the hallucinogenic concoctions used in their tribal rituals. The video for "Mercy Beat" captures a scene in which the crew were attacked by a cadre of communist rebels, angry at the appearance of what they considered to be Western intruders. Johnson confirmed that the scene was genuine and unscripted, and admitted that at the time he was "so high", recalling the madness that had ensued: "Someone produced a snake which I was grappling with, and I hate snakes. A monkey bit me, and then me and this guy, who I'd only just met, cut each other and we became blood brothers, rubbing blood over each other's face, stuff like that." The opening scenes for "Infected" picture Johnson strapped to a chair on board a boat sailing down a river in the jungle: Johnson said that he had wanted the opening of the film "to be like that Klaus Kinski movie Fitzcarraldo".

After spending a month in the Amazon jungle, Johnson flew back to New York to shoot the video for "Out of the Blue" with Tim Pope in the Spanish Harlem district. In keeping with the song's lyrical theme, part of the video was filmed in a brothel next door to a crack house. The police protected the film crew until 1:00 a.m. before leaving because they could no longer guarantee the crew's safety. The already tense situation was exacerbated by Johnson, who had been drinking heavily and provoked the crack dealers by throwing a bottle against the wall near them. Johnson and Pope also shot the video for "Twilight of a Champion" in New York, which includes a scene in which Johnson places a loaded gun in his mouth. Johnson explained his actions by saying: "I wanted to see what it felt like. To have all that power, to be so close to dying. It's incredible."

The final two videos were filmed in the UK, with "Angels of Deception" directed by Alastair McIlwain and "Slow Train to Dawn" directed by Pope. The video for "Slow Train to Dawn" features Neneh Cherry, who duets with Johnson on the track, tied to a railway line while Johnson pilots a train headed toward her. Pope later dismissed his work on the video, saying, "I hate that one. It's pretentious and kind of stupid."

The completed film premiered at the Electric Cinema in Notting Hill in West London and was first shown on British television on Channel 4 on 16 December 1986, followed by a showing on MTV. It was shown at independent cinemas across the world and released on VHS cassette early in 1987. It has never been released on DVD.

Despite critical acclaim for both the album and accompanying video film, the making of Infected took its toll on Johnson. Already unwell and suffering from bouts of paralysis because of his heavy intake of vodka and drugs, Johnson's failure to take care of his health and his insistence on pushing the boundaries during the making of the videos had a lasting impact. He separated from his girlfriend of five years (graphic designer Fiona Skinner, who created the The's logo) and withdrew from music for a time to recover his physical and mental health. Pope recalled that he had not particularly liked Johnson during filming as he had become arrogant. In 2002, Johnson said, "I took a long hard look at myself and realised I didn't like the way I was acting... That initial flush of success is a toxin, it really warps people's personalities for the worse and I didn't like what it did to me."

== Artwork ==
The album's artwork is by Matt Johnson's brother Andy. Fiona Skinner, who created the logo for the The, again modified an existing font and created transfers for Johnson to use in the final artwork.

== Infected song book ==
In addition to the album and video releases, a paperback book titled Infected 1979–87 was published (ISBN 9780863594441) containing over 120 pages which include the sheet music and lyrics hand written by Matt Johnson, for each track on Burning Blue Soul (1981), Soul Mining (1983) and Infected, along with newspaper clippings, gig reviews, photographs and promotional materials. The book also contains previously unseen artwork by Matt Johnson's brother Andy.

== Critical reception ==
Professional ratings
Review scores
Source	Rating
AllMusic	4.5/5 stars
Encyclopedia of Popular Music	4/5 stars
Q	4/5 stars
Record Mirror	4/5 stars
Sounds	4/5 stars

The reviews by the British music magazines were mostly very positive, with reviewers impressed by the bleakness of the lyrics and the strength of Johnson's vision. Melody Maker stated, "Kicking concepts of democratic creativity in the kidneys, Johnson has justifiably come out with a one-man vision of terrifying proportions." Sounds claimed that "there's self-controlled passion and strength seeping out all over this thing", while Q described the album as "grim stuff, with the lyrical tension well-matched by the music. Imagine a bizarre collision between Soft Cell and Tom Waits and you might get some idea of the disparate elements sloshing around in each of these songs." Record Mirror opined that "coming to any judgement about this new record is quite daunting. What becomes clear, however, is that we are dealing with something special... Two sides of this intense brooding can be a bit much to take though, and the lyrics are at times self-consciously poetic, but these are minor complaints. Infected might not be a particularly optimistic record, but it is rather a good one." Only NME was critical of the album, describing it as "shocking" but then pondering: "The question is – and it's one that was endlessly asked of [ David Bowie's studio album ] Low – what remains after the initial impact, my shock, wears off? The answer to that will vary, naturally, from one burning blue soul to the next; for me, the lasting afterglow is one of detachment... In the final analysis, living with Infected is like having one of those vast, mirror-windowed office blocks built across the road from your front door. You can't fail to notice it, and you'll be impressed, sure. But you won't grow to love it."

A retrospective review in AllMusic said, "Instead of the light fare displayed on Soul Mining, Infected's songs seethe instead of preen, and Matt Johnson's lyrics are laced with tension. Thematically, he plunges a lance into the exposed midsection of Great Britain, analyzing the state of modern urban life in the country... Infected was the first true indication of Johnson's mercurial nature, and established the dissonance and reinvention of his later work."

=== Accolades ===
Record Mirror placed Infected at number three in its year-end list of the best albums of 1986, and "Heartland" at number four in the equivalent singles list.

In 2000, Q placed Infected at number 99 in its list of the 100 greatest British albums. The album was also included in the book 1001 Albums You Must Hear Before You Die (2005).

== Singles ==
- "Heartland" – UK #29, August 1986
- "Infected" – UK #48, October 1986
- "Slow Train to Dawn" – UK #64, January 1987; Matt Johnson's vocals accompanied by Neneh Cherry
- "Sweet Bird of Truth" – UK #55, May 1987; Johnson's vocals accompanied by Anna Domino

== Track listing ==
All tracks written and composed by Matt Johnson, except where noted.

1. "Infected" – 4:49
2. "Out of the Blue (Into the Fire)" – 5:10
3. "Heartland" – 5:01
4. "Angels of Deception" – 4:37
5. "Sweet Bird of Truth" – 5:22
6. "Slow Train to Dawn" – 4:14
7. "Twilight of a Champion" (lyrics: Johnson; music: Johnson, Roli Mosimann) – 4:22
8. "The Mercy Beat" – 7:22

CD bonus tracks

9. "Infected" (12" version) – 6:12
10. "Sweet Bird of Truth" (12" version) – 7:37
11. "Slow Train to Dawn" (12" version) – 6:36

== Personnel ==
- Matt Johnson – guitar; keyboards; percussion; vocals
- David Palmer – drums
- Luís Jardim – percussion

with:

- Warne Livesey – bass guitar; organ; backing vocals; string arrangement
- Neneh Cherry – vocals on "Slow Train to Dawn"
- Dan K. Brown – electric bass guitar
- Jeff Clyne – acoustic bass guitar
- Dave Clayton – synth bass
- Steve Hogarth – piano
- Gary Moberley – Fairlight CMI operator
- Bashiri Johnson – percussion
- Roli Mosimann – percussion; programming
- Bob Mintzer, Jamie Talbot – saxophone
- Andrew Blake – baritone saxophone
- Guy Barker – trumpet; flugelhorn
- John Thirkell, David Defries, John Edcott – trumpet
- Pete Beachill, Ashley Slater, Steve Aitken – trombone
- Philip Eastop – French horn
- Judd Lander – harmonica
- Tessa Niles, Zeke Manyika, Anna Domino, the Croquets – backing vocals
- The Astarti String Orchestra – strings
- Gavyn Wright – orchestra leader
- The Deaf Section – brass
- Anne Dudley, Andrew Poppy – brass arrangements

== Charts ==
Chart (1986)	Peak position
Australian Albums (Kent Music Report)	15
Canada Top Albums/CDs (RPM)	46
Dutch Albums (Album Top 100)	46
New Zealand Albums (RMNZ)	12
Norwegian Albums (VG-lista)	14
Swedish Albums (Sverigetopplistan)	20
UK Albums (Official Charts)	14

== Release history ==
Region	Date	Label	Format	Catalog
United Kingdom and Europe	17 November 1986	Some Bizzare/Epic	LP	EPC 26770
United Kingdom and Europe	17 November 1986	Some Bizzare/Epic	Cassette	EPC 40 26770
United Kingdom and Europe	17 November 1986	Some Bizzare/Epic	CD	CD EPC 26770
United States	1986	Some Bizzare/Epic	LP	FE 40471
United States	1986	Some Bizzare/Epic	Cassette	ET 40471
United States	1986	Some Bizzare/Epic	CD	EK 40471
Canada	1986	Some Bizzare/Epic	LP	PEC 90746
Canada	1986	Some Bizzare/Epic	Cassette	PECT 90746
Canada	1986	Some Bizzare/Epic	CD	EK 90746
United Kingdom and Europe	1990	Some Bizzare/Epic	CD	EPC 488611 2
United States and Canada	2 July 2002	Epic	CD	EK 86615
United Kingdom and Europe	5 August 2002	Epic	CD	5044662000
