= Love Is Stronger Than Death =

Single by The The

from the album Dusk
- Released: 7 June 1993
- Recorded: 1992–1993
- Genre: Alternative rock
- Length: 4:39
- Label: Epic
- Songwriter(s): Matt Johnson

The The singles chronology
"Slow Emotion Replay" (1993)	"Love Is Stronger Than Death" (1993)	"I Saw the Light" (1995)

"Love Is Stronger Than Death" is a song by English rock band the The, and appears on the band's fourth studio album Dusk (1993). It was written by Matt Johnson, the only constant member of the The. Johnson wrote this song following the death of his brother. In his depression, he found that writing this song was therapeutic for him.

The title is a paraphrase of a biblical quote: "Set me as a seal upon thine heart, as a seal upon thine arm: for love is strong as death; jealousy is cruel as the grave: the coals thereof are coals of fire, which hath a most vehement flame." (Song of Solomon 8:6).

The song is also featured on the soundtrack to the Gregg Araki film Nowhere (1997), and plays over the closing credits.

The song went to #39 on the UK charts in 1993, and hit #14 on the Modern Rock charts.

== Track listing ==
UK CD (Part 1) - Epic 659371 2

1. "Love Is Stronger Than Death"
2. "The Sinking Feeling" (Live)
3. "The Mercy Beat" (Live)
4. "Armageddon Days Are Here (Again)" (Live)

UK CD (Part 2) - Epic 659371 5

1. "Love Is Stronger Than Death"
2. "Infected" (New Version) (Live)
3. "Soul Mining" (New Version) (Live)
4. "Armageddon Days Are Here (Again)" (New Version) (Live)
