= Two Puddings =

Pub and music venue in London, England

Coordinates: 51.540454°N 0.001283°E

The Two Puddings was a pub and live music venue on Stratford Broadway in Stratford, east London.

== History ==
In the 1940s and 1950s the venue became known as "the Butcher's Shop" because of its reputation for fighting and spilt blood.

From 1962 until the pub's closure in 2000, the landlord was Eddie Johnson, father of Matt Johnson, lead vocalist of the The. Eddie Johnson retired to Long Melford, Suffolk, and died in June 2018, aged 86.

Performers included the Who, the Small Faces, Screaming Lord Sutch and David Essex, who played his first gig there.

On the first floor was the Devil's Kitchen which is believed to be one of the first discos in the UK.
