= Keith Laws =

British professor of neuropsychology

Keith R. Laws
- Born: 6 April 1961 (age 65); London, England
- Occupation: Psychologist
- Known for: Neuropsychology

Keith R. Laws is a British academic who serves as professor of neuropsychology at the School of Psychology at the University of Hertfordshire. Laws' research centres on how cognitive functions and processes relate to brain structure and function; notably for research on cognitive functioning in people suffering from neurological and psychiatric disorders.

== Career ==
Laws completed a PhD at the Department of Experimental Psychology, University of Cambridge. He is the author of over 100 papers and a recent book entitled 'Category-Specificity: Evidence for Modularity of Mind'. He is a Chartered Psychologist, Associate Fellow of the British Psychological Society (AFBPsS), Fellow of the Higher Education Academy (FHEA), a Fellow of the Royal Society of Arts (FRSA) and various academic organisations including the British Neuropsychological Society, British Neuropsychiatric Association, Experimental Psychology Society. and an editor at PLOS ONE.

Laws, with his colleagues, created one of the first research groups to investigate impairment of everyday knowledge in patients with schizophrenia and to demonstrate worse cognitive outcomes in women suffering from Alzheimer's disease. Laws' work on the link between MDMA (also known as ecstasy) drug use and poor memory is the principal analysis of its kind to date, and has been broadly cited in both national and international media. In 2013 he published a study showing that women are better at multitasking than men.

== Cognitive Behavioural Therapy for Psychosis (CBTp) ==
Laws has been a strong critic of the use of CBT for treating the psychotic symptoms associated with schizophrenia.

== Music career ==
Laws was a former exponent of experimental music, and was a founding member of the post-punk band The The.

Laws is credited by fellow the The founder Matt Johnson as being the originator of the band name. Laws answered an advertisement placed by Johnson in NME in 1978, seeking musicians to form a band. The The as a duo, recorded the 7" 45rpm single for 4AD, "Controversial Subject"/"Black and White". Produced by Bruce Gilbert and Graham Lewis of Wire, Laws played synthesiser and sang, and Matt Johnson played guitar and also contributed vocals. The record sleeve mentions both Tom Johnston and Triash (Peter Ashworth) as having contributed, although the recordings featured only Laws and Johnson.

In early 1981, the The also contributed the composition "Untitled" for The Some Bizzare Album. In September of that year, the duo of Johnson and Laws signed a deal with Some Bizzare Records, and released the 7-inch single "Cold Spell Ahead".

== Bibliography ==
=== Books ===
- Laws, Keith; Adlington, Rebecca L; Gale, Tim M; Moreno-Martínez, Francisco J (2010). Category-specificity: evidence for modularity of mind. New York: Nova Science Publishers. ISBN 9781608766437.

=== Journal articles ===
- Laws, Keith R; Hill, K; Mann, L; Stephenson, CME; Nimmo-Smith, Ian; McKenna, Peter J (October 2004). "Hypofrontality in schizophrenia: a meta-analysis of functional imaging studies". Acta Psychiatrica Scandinavica. 110 (4): 243–256. doi:10.1111/j.1600-0447.2004.00376.x. hdl:2299/873. PMID 15352925. S2CID 78405.
- Laws, Keith R; Lynch, D; McKenna, Peter J (January 2010). "Cognitive behavioural therapy for major psychiatric disorder: does it really work? A meta-analytical review of well-controlled trials". Psychological Medicine. 40 (1): 9–24. doi:10.1017/S003329170900590X. hdl:2299/5741. PMID 19476688.
- Laws, Keith R; Irvine, Karen; Kondel, Tejinder K; Gale, Tim M (August 2012). "Greater cognitive deterioration in women than men with Alzheimer's disease: a meta analysis". Human Psychopharmacology: Clinical and Experimental. 34 (9): 989–998. doi:10.1080/13803395.2012.712676. PMID 22913619. S2CID 28300240.
- Laws, Keith R; Sweetnam, Hilary; Kondel, Tejinder K (November 2012). "Is Ginkgo biloba a cognitive enhancer in healthy individuals? A meta-analysis". Human Psychopharmacology: Clinical and Experimental. 27 (6): 527–533. doi:10.1002/hup.2259. PMID 23001963. S2CID 6307491.
- Laws, Keith R; Irvine, Karen (December 2012). "Do women with Alzheimer's disease demonstrate greater cognitive deterioration?". Neurodegenerative Disease Management. 2 (6): 561–564. doi:10.2217/nmt.12.64.
- Laws, Keith R; Stoet, Gijsbert; O'Connor, Daryl B; Conner, Mark (October 2013). "Are women better than men at multi-tasking?". BMC Psychology. 1 (1): 18. doi:10.1186/2050-7283-1-18.
- Laws, Keith R; Jauhar, Sameer; McKenna, Peter J; Radua, Joaquim; Fung, E; Salvador, R (January 2014). "Cognitive-behavioural therapy for the symptoms of schizophrenia: systematic review and meta-analysis with examination of potential bias". The British Journal of Psychiatry. 204 (1): 20–29. doi:10.1192/bjp.bp.112.116285. PMID 24385461.
