= This Is the Day =

1983 single by the The

Single by the The

from the album Soul Mining
- Released: 2 September 1983
- Studio: The Garden (London) (Note: Although the only two studios credited in the liner notes for Soul Mining are Advision and Sarm, Johnson has since stated in several interviews that the majority of the album was recorded at the Garden studio in Shoreditch, east London.); Advision (London); Sarm West (London)
- Genre: Synth-pop; new wave
- Length: 4:59 (album version); 3:42 (single edit)
- Label: Some Bizzare; Epic
- Songwriter: Matt Johnson
- Producers: Paul Hardiman; Matt Johnson

The The singles chronology
"Perfect" (1983)	"This Is the Day" (1983)	"Heartland" (1986)

Music video
- "This Is the Day" on YouTube

"This Is the Day" is a song written by Matt Johnson and originally released as a single by his band the The on 2 September 1983. It reached No. 71 on the UK singles chart. A version of the song was included on the band's debut studio album Soul Mining, released in October 1983.

A re-recorded version of the song, re-titled "That Was the Day", was released as the lead track on the Dis-Infected extended play (EP) in 1993. The EP reached number 17 on the UK singles chart.

== Track listing ==
7" single

1. "This Is the Day" – 3:42
2. "Mental Healing Process" – 3:44

12" single

1. "This Is the Day" (Extended Version) – 5:22
2. "I've Been Waitin' for Tomorrow (All of My Life)" (Special Mix) – 7:36

== Artwork ==
The artwork is by Andy Johnson. The font was designed by Fiona Skinner. An alternative layout for the the The logo was used on this single with the lowercase 'the' larger and set at an angle.

== Music video ==
Fiona Skinner directed the promo video for the re-release of 1983 single. The video is a collage of images and memories illustrating Matt Johnson's childhood and Skinner and Johnson's relationship. The single was re-released around the time they split. Skinner created the farewell promo for the song.

== Personnel ==
Credits for the album version are adapted from the sleeve notes for Soul Mining.

- Matt Johnson – synths, instruments, percussion, vocals
- Andy Duncan – drums
- Paul Boyle – fiddle
- Wix Wickens (credited as "Wicks") – accordion

== Charts ==
Chart performance for "This Is the Day"
Chart (1983)	Peak position
UK Singles (Official Charts)	71

Chart performance for "That Was the Day"
Chart (1994)	Peak position
UK Singles (Official Charts)	17

== Certifications ==
Region	Certification	Certified units/sales
United Kingdom (BPI)	Silver	200,000^{‡}
^{‡} Sales+streaming figures based on certification alone.

== Manic Street Preachers version ==
"This Is the Day"

Single by Manic Street Preachers

from the album National Treasures – The Complete Singles
- Released: 18 September 2011
- Studio: Faster Recording Studios (Cardiff)
- Genre: Alternative rock; electronic rock
- Length: 3:41
- Label: Columbia
- Songwriter: Matt Johnson
- Producers: Loz Williams; Manic Street Preachers

Manic Street Preachers singles chronology
"Postcards from a Young Man" (2010)	"This Is the Day" (2011)	"Show Me the Wonder" (2013)

Music video
- "This Is the Day" on YouTube

In September 2011, "This Is the Day" was covered by the Welsh rock band Manic Street Preachers as a single to promote their compilation album National Treasures – The Complete Singles. The CD single was only available as a limited edition with the CD/DVD version of National Treasures on the HMV website.

=== Track listing ===
Digital download

1. "This Is the Day" – 3:37
2. "We Were Never Told" – 3:20

HMV exclusive CD

1. "This Is the Day" – 3:37
2. "Rock 'n' Roll Genius" – 2:40
