= The The =

English post-punk band

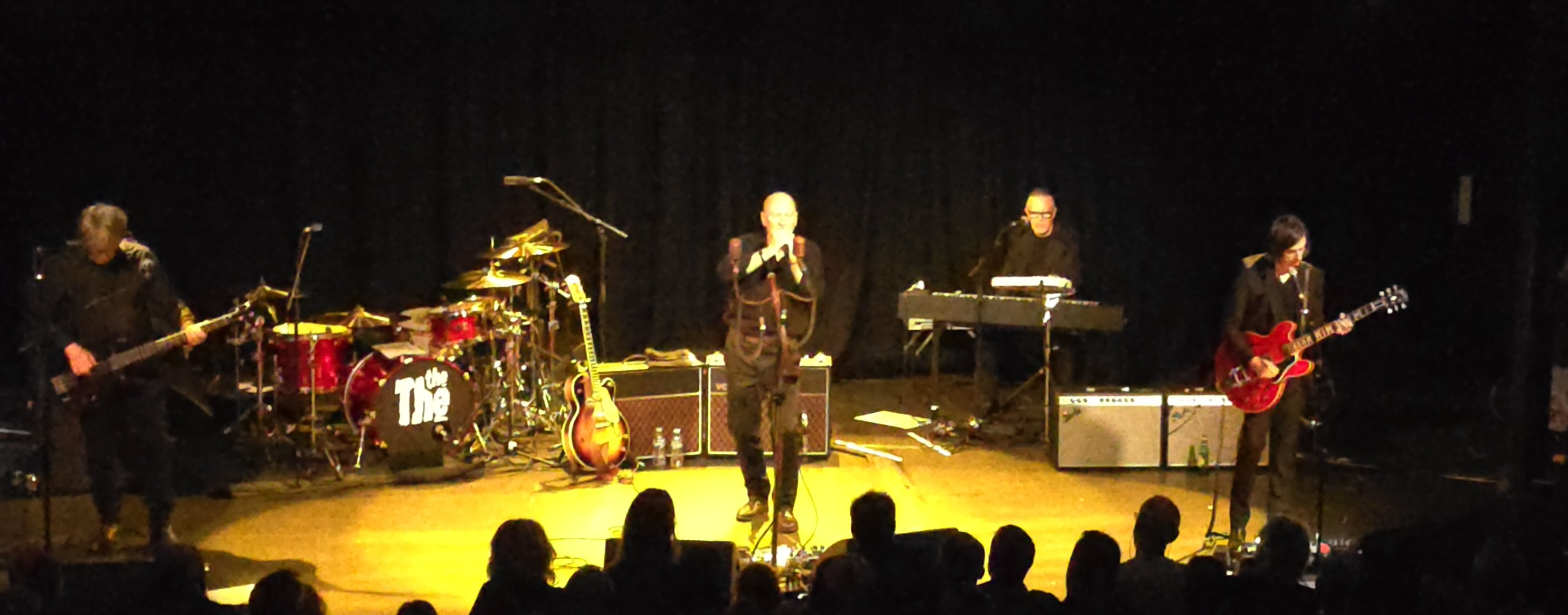
- The The performing in 2024

Background information
- Origin: London, England
- Genres: New wave; post-punk; art pop; alternative rock
- Years active: 1979–present
- Labels: 4AD; Some Bizzare; Epic; Nothing/Interscope; Lazarus/Cineola
- Members: Matt Johnson; James Eller; D. C. Collard; Earl Harvin; Barrie Cadogan
- Past members: Keith Laws; Tom Johnston; Peter Ashworth; Colin Lloyd Tucker; Simon Fisher Turner; David Palmer; Johnny Marr; Jim Fitting; Keith Joyner; Jared Michael Nickerson; Eric Schermerhorn; Brian MacLeod; Brad Kahn; Gail Ann Dorsey; Spencer Campbell; Andrew Kubiszewski; Chris Whitten
- Website: thethe.com

The The are an English rock band from London, formed in 1979 by singer-songwriter Matt Johnson, the only constant member, and often the sole member.

The The achieved critical acclaim and commercial success in the UK, with 15 chart singles, seven reaching the top 40. Their most successful studio album, Infected (1986), spent 30 weeks on the chart. They followed this with the top-ten studio albums Mind Bomb (1989) and Dusk (1993).

The The operated as a solo project from 1982 to 1987, though albums featured contributions from musicians such as Jools Holland, JG Thirlwell and Neneh Cherry. It became a full band from 1988 to 2002 and featured the guitarist Johnny Marr until 1994. The The went on hiatus from 2002 to 2017, and released their first studio album in 24 years, Ensoulment, in 2024.

== History ==
=== Early years (1977–1981) ===
While trying to get his band going, in 1978 Matt Johnson had recorded a solo demo album (See Without Being Seen) which he sold at various underground gigs on cassettes. In 1979, working with Colin Lloyd-Tucker (a friend and colleague at De Wolfe Music, the Soho music publisher/recording studio) Johnson recorded his first album proper, Spirits. This album remains unreleased, though the track "What Stanley Saw" was later licensed to Cherry Red Records for their Perspectives and Distortion compilation album, which also featured Virgin Prunes, Lemon Kittens, Thomas Leer, Kevin Coyne and Mark Perry.

In November 1977 Johnson had placed an advertisement in NME seeking "bass/lead guitarist" who liked the Velvet Underground and Syd Barrett. In 1979 he placed a second advertisement in the NME, stating his new influences as the Residents and Throbbing Gristle.

The The made their debut at London's Africa Centre on 11 May 1979, third on the bill to Scritti Politti and PragVEC, using backing tape tracks that Johnson created at his day job at De Wolfe studios for the drums and bass. The band at this point consisted of Johnson on vocal, electric piano, guitar and tapes and Keith Laws on synthesiser and tapes. Laws suggested the name the The to Matt Johnson.

As the The was now getting under way, Johnson was simultaneously working with experimental synth-pop combo the Gadgets, a studio group he formed with Colin Lloyd Tucker, his colleague at De Wolfe recording studios.

Peter Ashworth, then known as Triash and later to become a noted photographer, became the The's drummer in 1980, and Tom Johnston (also managing the The at this point and later to become a cartoonist for the Evening Standard, Daily Mirror and The Sun newspapers) was added on bass. Although both Ashworth and Johnston were credited with appearing on the The's debut single ("Controversial Subject"/"Black and White") on 4AD Records, neither actually played on the recordings, which were produced by Wire members Bruce Gilbert and Graham Lewis. All instruments were played by Johnson and Laws. Johnston and Ashworth soon dropped out of the The and returned to their respective day jobs. As a duo (Johnson and Laws), the The began performing concerts with Wire, Cabaret Voltaire, DAF, This Heat, the Birthday Party and Scritti Politti.

In early 1981 the The also contributed the composition "Untitled" to the Some Bizzare Album. In September of that year Johnson and Laws signed a recording contract with Some Bizzare Records and released the 7" single "Cold Spell Ahead". By this stage Matt Johnson had begun playing all the instruments himself so Laws left to pursue his studies, leaving Johnson as a solo artist using a group moniker.

Johnson was signed up later in 1981 to 4AD Records by Ivo Watts-Russell to record a solo studio album, Burning Blue Soul. All instrumentation and vocals were performed by Johnson, but the album featured various producers including Wire's Bruce Gilbert and Graham Lewis, Ivo and Johnson himself. Years later, owing to a request from Johnson, it would be re-issued and credited to the The so all of his albums would be in the same rack together.

Towards the end of 1981 Colin Lloyd-Tucker and Simon Fisher Turner joined the band for a series of stripped-down the The acoustic concerts in London.

=== Matt Johnson solo years (1982–1987) ===
Johnson spent the next few years collaborating with a diverse range of creative individuals, changing personnel from project to project.

The The's next single was a retooling of "Cold Spell Ahead", now entitled "Uncertain Smile". Produced in New York by Mike Thorne, it reached No. 68 in the UK singles chart. This version is different from the more familiar album version, and featured saxophone and flute by session musician Crispin Cioe rather than (as on the album version) the piano of Squeeze's Jools Holland.

In 1982, the intended debut album by the The (The Pornography of Despair) was recorded, but was never officially mixed nor released. Johnson apparently ran off some cassette copies for friends, and several tracks ("Mental Healing Process", "Leap into the Wind", "Absolute Liberation") were subsequently issued as additional tracks on the "This Is the Day" single. "Three Orange Kisses from Kazan" and "Waitin' for the Upturn" (featuring Steve James Sherlock playing flute and saxophone) also date from this era, and appeared as B-sides. Some of the previously mentioned cuts, along with the tracks "The Nature of Virtue" and "Fruit of the Heart" (which were similarly recorded around the same time), appeared as bonus selections on a cassette-only issue of the band's eventual debut album, but The Pornography of Despair album as a whole remains unissued.

Around 1982 the The played a series of four concerts at the Marquee Club in Wardour Street, Soho, entitled 'An evening of Rock n Roll with the The'. These concerts were weekly for four weeks and featured Marc Almond on guitar and vocals.

The The released their official studio album debut, the synth-noir effort Soul Mining, in 1983. It featured the minor UK No. 71 hit "This Is the Day", as well as a new recording of the The performing "Uncertain Smile". Produced by Johnson and Paul Hardiman, it featured guest appearances from Orange Juice's drummer Zeke Manyika, Jools Holland, Thomas Leer and JG Thirlwell (a.k.a. Foetus).

During the The's more prolific period of releases, from Soul Mining (1983) to Dusk (1992), most artwork used on the albums and single releases was produced by Johnson's brother Andrew Johnson, using the pseudonym Andy Dog. The artwork has a distinctive style, and sometimes courted controversy, most notably the initial release of the 1986 single "Infected", which featured a masturbating devil and was withdrawn from sale and re-issued with an edited version of the same drawing.

In 1985, the non-album track "Flesh and Bones" was released on the compilation album If You Can't Please Yourself, You Can't Please Your Soul by EMI.

For their second studio album Infected (1986), the The still consisted only of Johnson, but was augmented by session musicians and featured friends such as Manyika and Rip Rig + Panic singer Neneh Cherry and Anna Domino. This album spawned four charting singles in the UK, notably "Heartland", which made the UK top 30. It was also unusual for having a full-length accompanying film. Costing hundreds of thousands of pounds, Infected: The Movie was shot on locations in Bolivia, Peru and New York. Different songs were directed by different directors, mainly Tim Pope and Peter 'Sleazy' Christopherson (of Throbbing Gristle).

Throughout 1986–1987 Johnson toured the world extensively with Infected: The Movie, showing the film in cinemas in place of performing live concerts. The film was also shown twice in its entirety on Channel 4 in the UK, on MTV's 120 Minutes in the US, and on MuchMusic's City Limits in Canada.

In 1987, Johnson also took some tentative steps back into live performance. Whilst promoting Infected: The Movie in Australia he had a chance encounter with Billy Bragg, who persuaded him to return to Britain and support Red Wedge, a coalition of like-minded musicians supporting the Labour Party in its general election campaign. Johnson agreed and enrolled longtime friend and collaborator Manyika to join him in performing shows in London featuring stripped-down versions of political the The songs such as "Heartland". This experience convinced Johnson to put a band together once again.

=== Return to a full band (1988–2002) ===
By 1988, the The was an actual band again, Johnson having recruited ex-Smiths guitarist Johnny Marr, ex-Nick Lowe bassist James Eller, and ex-ABC drummer David Palmer as fully-fledged members. This line-up, plus guest singer Sinéad O'Connor, recorded their third studio album Mind Bomb, which debuted at No. 4 in the UK Albums Chart and featured the band's highest-charting single to that time, "The Beat(en) Generation", which peaked at No. 18 in the UK singles chart.

Keyboardist D.C. Collard was added to the official line-up in 1989 after the band's former session player Steve Hogarth, who had played on Infected, opted to become the new lead vocalist of Marillion instead. The band embarked on a lengthy world tour in 1989–90 called the The Versus the World. The live film of the same name, directed by Tim Pope, was filmed during the three nights the The performed at London's Royal Albert Hall at the end of the tour. Vocalist Melanie Redmond, who had just completed a world tour with Duran Duran, joined the tour during the European leg as a session musician.

The studio EP Shades of Blue was released in 1990. This included cover versions of Fred Neil's "Dolphins" and Duke Ellington's "Solitude" as well as a new original song "Jealous of Youth" and a live version of "Another Boy Drowning" from Burning Blue Soul. This and a later EP of remixes, 1993's Dis-infected, were compiled into a 1994 full-length album for the North American market called Solitude.

In 1993, with Johnson, Marr, Collard, Eller and Palmer, Some Bizzare Records/Epic issued their fourth studio album Dusk, which debuted at No. 2 in the UK and spun off three top 40 singles in the UK, led by "Dogs of Lust". Another world tour followed, the Lonely Planet tour, at which point the band's line-up was reshuffled; Marr and Eller left, and were replaced by Atlanta-based guitarist Keith Joyner and New York bassist Jared Michael Nickerson after Johnson relocated the band to the US. Also added was Boston harmonica player Jim Fitting (formerly of Treat Her Right), who auditioned in New York in early 1993. Palmer bowed out partway through the tour and was replaced by ex-Stabbing Westward drummer Andy Kubiszewski. The band headlined the main stage at the 1993 Reading Festival.

Another full-length film, directed by longtime collaborator Tim Pope, was made for this album. From Dusk Til Dawn was shot in New Orleans and New York. Along with Johnson and Johnny Marr, it also features various characters from the New York underground scene such as sexologist Annie Sprinkle, writer and raconteur Quentin Crisp, Guardian Angels founder Curtis Sliwa, and pornographic film actor Rick Savage amongst many carnival characters.

Now permanently relocated to New York, the The's next project was 1995's Hanky Panky, an album that consisted entirely of Hank Williams cover versions. Hanky Panky was recorded by a new group consisting of Johnson, Collard, Fitting, ex-Iggy Pop guitarist Eric Schermerhorn, former bassist for David Bowie Gail Ann Dorsey (billed as "Hollywood" Dorsey), and drummer the "Reverend" Brian MacLeod. Their cover version of "I Saw the Light" hit No. 31 UK, released by Some Bizzare Label / Epic.

An experimental album Gun Sluts was recorded in 1997, but it was left unreleased by the band after it was rejected for being too uncommercial by their label. The The severed their 18-year relationship with Sony and moved to Interscope, on Trent Reznor's Nothing Records imprint.

In 2000, the The, at this time consisting of Johnson, Schermerhorn, Nashville bassist Spencer Campbell and New Jersey drummer Earl Harvin, released NakedSelf and embarked on another lengthy world tour, the Naked Tour, which lasted 14 months.

This same line-up also recorded two new tracks, "Deep Down Truth", featuring Angela McCluskey on vocals and "Pillar Box Red". Both songs were produced by Clive Langer and Alan Winstanley for the 2002 compilation album 45 RPM: The Singles of the The.

In June 2002, the The made a sole live appearance at Meltdown festival at London's Royal Festival Hall as guests of David Bowie. At this point, the band consisted solely of Johnson, longtime friend and collaborator JG Thirlwell on tapes and loops, and young film director Benn Northover on film and video.

=== Hiatus (2003–2017) ===
Since 2003, the reclusive Johnson has generally kept away from the public eye and has concentrated primarily on soundtrack work, scoring numerous documentaries, films, and art installations. The The's music has featured in a diverse range of cinema over many years, from cult classics such as Jürgen Muschalek's (Muscha) Decoder ("Three Orange Kisses from Kazan") and Gregg Araki's Nowhere ("Love Is Stronger Than Death") to big-budget epics such as Sylvester Stallone's Judge Dredd ("Darkness Falls"), prompting Johnson's move into film score composition.

For English director Nichola Bruce, it has included the documentary One Man Show: Dramatic Art of Steven Berkoff (1995) and a documentary feature film about the Apollo Moon landings, Moonbug, which was completed in autumn 2010 and won the Special Jury Remi Award for Theatrical Feature Documentary at the 2011 WorldFest-Houston International Film Festival. The soundtrack was released in 2012 as volume 2 in the series of original soundtrack albums produced through Johnson's Cineola imprint.

For Swedish filmmaker Johanna St Michaels, this has included Best Wishes Bernhard (prize winning film of Dokumentär Films Premien Nordic Panorama 2003), Snapshots from Reality (Nominated for Best International Short at the Birds Eye View Film festival at London's ICA 2007), The Track (2007), Going Live (2008), The Island Amid the Worlds (2010) and Bilder av Dina (2010). The latest collaboration between Johnson and St Michaels, Penthouse North, premiered at the Hot Docs Canadian International Documentary Festival in May 2014.

In June 2009, it was announced that the The had created an original soundtrack to the Gerard Johnson debut feature film Tony, released February 2010 on the The's Cineola imprint in March 2010, as the first volume of several forthcoming soundtrack and instrumental albums.

In May 2014, the The completed an original soundtrack for Gerard Johnson's subsequent film, Hyena, starring Peter Ferdinando, Stephen Graham, and Neil Maskell. The album was released on 6 March 2015 as the third part in the Cineola series.

In May 2007, the The released a new download-only single on their web site. Entitled "Mrs. Mac," the track is an autobiographical song about Johnson's first day at school as a child in Stratford, East London. All instruments and vocals on the track were performed by Johnson.

A press release was issued along with this track, announcing a forthcoming the The album called The End of the Day with various songs from the The's catalogue being performed by some of Johnson's favourite artists including Elysian Fields, JG Thirlwell, Thomas Leer, Elbow, Rob Ellis, John Parish, Anna Domino, Meja, Angela McCluskey, Ergo Phizmiz, and Rustin Man (a.k.a. Paul Webb), among others. The album was eventually released in October 2017 in the Radio Cineola - The Trilogy box set.

Since 2009, "This Is the Day" has been extensively used in high-profile advertising campaigns for Levi's Dockers, M&M's and Amazon. It was used as the opening song for the film I Feel Pretty (2018).

The The's music continued to appear on British radio and television such as in Shane Meadows' 2010 Channel 4 miniseries This Is England '86 and in 2013 in the award-winning British comedy-drama television series Fresh Meat. In 2011, "This Is the Day" was covered by Welsh rock band Manic Street Preachers.

Matt Johnson has created several new arms of the The:

- Cinéola; a label specifically created for soundtrack and spoken word releases published on CDs within small, hardback books, complete with photographs and text.
- Radio Cinéola; a 15-minute "shortwave radio" broadcast downloadable from the official web site and featuring previews of upcoming releases, works in progress, chats with collaborators, and, previously unheard material from the vault. The broadcasts are presented by Johnson and other guests. Shows have so far included contributions from and collaborations with musicians DJ Food, Deadly Avenger, Hayley Willis, Thomas Feiner, Angela McCluskey, and Colin Lloyd Tucker plus poet John Tottenham, photographer Steve Pyke, actress Marlene Kaminsky, spiritual healer Abdi Assadi, and many others. Monthly downloadable Radio Cineola broadcasts ceased at the end of December 2010 although the broadcasts continue at randomly chosen dates.
- Fifty First State Press; a book publishing company whose name is inspired by the chorus of Johnson's 1986 song "Heartland." The first release, in 2012, was Tales From The Two Puddings, a memoir by Matt's dad, Eddie, which recounts the Johnson family's time owning one of East London's most notorious pubs and music houses, the Two Puddings in Stratford. It features many of the famous customers of this pub, such as Jack Charlton, the Kray twins, Van Morrison, Bobby Moore, Clyde McPhatter, the Who, Daniel Farson and Terry Spinks.

During this period, Johnson's political activity has been limited to conservation issues in his native east London. He was a founder member of the Save Shoreditch committee and directed and narrated a short film for its cause. Along with fellow artists such as Brad Lochore, Tracey Emin and Lucinda Rogers he has been fighting the eastwards expansion of the City of London into Shoreditch and the probable demolition of much of this East London neighbourhood. The day after the London Olympics finished in August 2012 Johnson made a rare public appearance on the BBC's Newsnight current affairs programme, in order to debate with Robin Wales, the Mayor of Newham, about the impact and legacy of the Olympic Games upon Stratford, the part of London Johnson grew up in.

In the spring of 2014, Sony Music Entertainment announced plans to release a Soul Mining 30th Anniversary Deluxe Edition Boxset in the summer of 2014. The reissue was remastered by Matt Johnson at Abbey Road Studios.

HarperCollins imprint The Friday Project announced in the spring of 2014 that they would be publishing the first official biography of the The, authored by Neil Fraser.

=== Reformation and new material (2017–present) ===
For 2017's Record Store Day, after premiering the song on a Radio Cineola broadcast, the The released a new 7" record called "We Can't Stop What's Coming," collaborating once again with Johnny Marr. On 10 September, it was announced that Johnson would be touring as the The again for the first time in 17 years. Two dates were announced, in Denmark on 1 June 2018 and at Royal Albert Hall on 5 June 2018. The Royal Albert Hall tickets sold out, with two extra performances added at O2's Brixton Academy and Troxy, both in London. Several more shows around the UK and Europe were subsequently added, as well as eight shows in the US. The The also played on 2 and 3 October 2018 in the Sydney Opera House.

The touring announcement came subsequent to the The announcing a new triple-vinyl limited-edition box set, Radio Cineola: Trilogy, to be released when they kick off their first gigs since 2002. Featuring three albums – The End of the Day, The Inertia Variations, and Midnight to Midnight – the triple box set package, available for pre-order from 6 October 2017, also came with 48-page bound book which included album lyrics and exclusive photos. The End of the Day contains interpretations of a selection of the The songs from singers across the globe and includes the The's recent single "We Can't Stop What's Coming". The Inertia Variations features Johnson narrating John Tottenham's epic poetic cycle. "Midnight to Midnight includes interviews and soundscapes taken from Johnson's 12-hour UK Election Day Radio Cineola shortwave broadcast plus the electronic score from The Inertia Variations documentary," said a spokesperson for the band speaking to The Quietus.

In January 2021, the soundtrack to the 2019 film Muscle, directed by Gerard Johnson, was released. The first track on this EP was "I Want 2 B U," a new song that was released as a 7" single for Record Store Day 2020.

On 29 October 2021, the The released The Comeback Special on Cinéola and earMUSIC, a live album recorded at the Royal Albert Hall gig in 2018. This album was released in a number of formats, including one release with an art book and a film of the performance.

In October 2023, the The announced their first tour since 2018 that will take place in 2024. In May 2024, it was announced that Ensoulment, the band's first studio album in nearly 25 years, was released in September to accompany the tour.

== Members ==
=== Current touring band members ===
On 18 May 2018, the band members for the live comeback were announced on the official the The Facebook page.

- Matt Johnson – vocals, guitars, keyboards, bass, melodica, engineering (1979–2002, 2017–present)
- James Eller – bass guitar, backing vocals (1988–1994, 2018–present)
- DC Collard – keyboards, melodica, backing vocals (1989–1997, 2018–present)
- Earl Harvin – drums (1998–2002, 2018–present)
- Barrie Cadogan – lead guitar, backing vocals (2018–present)

=== Official members ===
Matt Johnson is the only permanent member of the The. From 1983 to 1988 and again from 2002 to the present, he was the only official member. Some former permanent members currently play in the band as touring musicians.

Official band members have been:

- Keith Laws – synthesiser (1979–1981). (later a professor of Neuropsychology at the University of Hertfordshire)
- Tom Johnston – bass guitar (1980). (later a cartoonist for national newspapers)
- Triash (a.k.a. Peter Ashworth) – drums, percussion (1980)
- Colin Lloyd Tucker – guitars/vocals (1981)
- Simon Fisher Turner – guitars/vocals (1981)
- David Palmer – drums (1985–1994)
- Johnny Marr – guitars and harmonica (1988–1994, 2017, 2025)
- Jim Fitting – harmonica (1993–1995)
- Keith Joyner – guitar (1993–1994)
- Jared Michael Nickerson – bass (1993–1994)
- Eric Schermerhorn – guitars (1995–2002)
- Brian MacLeod – drums (1995–1997)
- Gail Ann Dorsey (billed as 'Hollywood' Dorsey) – bass (1995)
- Spencer Campbell – bass and backing vocals (1998–2002)

=== Collaborators and contributors ===
The following artists were not official members of the The but made notable contributions to various projects by the band:

- Marc Almond – vocals (1982)
- David Johansen – harmonica (1982)
- Fiona Skinner – graphic designer & film-maker: the The logo & font, typography, cover designs & layouts, video/promo direction.
- JG Thirlwell – tapes, samples, percussion (1983–present)
- Andy Dog – paintings, illustrations, sleeves, (1981–1993)
- Tim Pope – filmmaker (1986–2021)
- Peter Christopherson – filmmaker (1986–1987)
- Jools Holland – piano (1983)
- Thomas Leer – keyboards (1983)
- Jean-Marc Lederman – live keyboards (1983)
- Zeke Manyika – drums
- Steve Hogarth – piano (1986)
- Neneh Cherry – vocals (1986)
- Anna Domino – vocals (1986)
- Andrew Poppy – arrangement (1986)
- Ashley Slater – trombone (1986)
- Sinéad O'Connor – vocals (1989)
- Melanie Redmond – vocals (1989–1990)
- Vinnie Colaiuta – drums (1993)
- Bruce Smith – drums (1993)
- Danny Thompson – upright bass (1988–1993)
- Lloyd Cole – vocals (1999)
- Benn Northover – filmmaker (2002)
- Ian Peel – producer, sound collage (2002)
- Steve James Sherlock – saxophone, flute (1979–81)
- Wix Wickens – piano, Hammond organ, accordion (1983, 1989)
- Mark Feltham – harmonica on Mind Bomb (1989): "Kingdom of Rain" / "Good Morning Beautiful" / "The Beat(en) Generation" / "The Violence of Truth"
- Angela McCluskey – vocals on "Deep Down Truth" (2002)

== Discography ==
=== Commercially released albums ===
- Matt Johnson: Burning Blue Soul (1981) – AUS No. 198
  - Original release and 1983 reissue credited to Matt Johnson. The 1993 re-release of Burning Blue Soul credits this album to the The.

Year	Album details	Peak chart positions										Certifications (sales thresholds)
Year	Album details	UK	AUS	AUT	GER	NED	NOR	NZ	SWE	SWI	US	Certifications (sales thresholds)
1983	Soul Mining	27	70	—	—	14	—	16	—	—	—	BPI: Gold
1986	Infected	14	15	—	—	46	14	12	20	—	89	BPI: Gold
1989	Mind Bomb	4	32	—	24	39	—	3	30	—	138	
1993	Dusk	2	20	28	23	37	10	6	15	20	142	
1995	Hanky Panky	28	121	—	66	—	17	—	22	50	—	
2000	NakedSelf	45	127	—	80	—	—	—	—	—	—	
2010	Tony (soundtrack)	—	—	—	—	—	—	—	—	—	—	
2012	Moonbug (soundtrack)	—	—	—	—	—	—	—	—	—	—	
2015	Hyena (soundtrack)	—	—	—	—	—	—	—	—	—	—	
2020	Muscle (soundtrack)	—	—	—	—	—	—	—	—	—	—	
2021	The Comeback Special: Live at the Royal Albert hall	41	—	—	20	—	—	—	—	—	—	
2024	Ensoulment	19	—	15	11	79	—	—	—	54	—	
"—" denotes albums that did not chart or were not released.

=== Compilation albums ===
- Solitude (1993) – AUS No. 126
- 45 RPM (2002) - AUS No. 180
- London Town Box Set (2002)

Exclusive the The tracks appear on the following compilation albums of tracks by various artists:

- Some Bizzare Album (1981)
- Natures Mortes – Still Lives (1982)
- If You Can't Please Yourself, You Can't Please Your Soul (1985)
- Judge Dredd Original Motion Picture Soundtrack (1996)
- Mitra Music for Nepal (2015)
- 90's Rarities – Volume 2 (2016)

=== Unreleased, limited edition and promo-only albums ===
The recording career of the The and Matt Johnson features numerous albums that have never seen commercial release. Despite their unavailability on disc, Johnson includes these albums in almost every official discography issued by the band.

Year	Artist	Title	Notes	
Year	Artist	Title	Description	Release status
1978	Matt Johnson	See Without Being Seen	A Matt Johnson solo project	Very limited cassette release, only available at concerts. Eventually released through the website as limited edition cassette tape in 2019.
1979	Matt Johnson	Spirits	A Matt Johnson solo project	Unreleased in any form. One track ("What Stanley Saw") later licensed to Cherry Red Records for their compilation Perspectives & Distortion
1982	The The	The Pornography of Despair	Scrapped debut album	Commercially unreleased. Some cassette copies were run off for friends of Matt Johnson. Several tracks were later used as B-sides and bonus tracks on other albums
1997	The The	Gun Sluts	Completed album for Sony, who declined to release it. Part I of a planned "New York" trilogy; NakedSelf was Part II.	Unreleased. Some "rough mixes" have been streamed on the The's website
2000	The The	Karmic Gravity	Part III of the "New York" trilogy of albums. Alternate title: Two Blocks Below Canal Street. Recorded, but unmixed	Unreleased. Some "rough mixes" have been streamed on the The's website
2002	The The	Film Music	Compilation of soundtrack music	Promotional-only release
2007	The The	The End of the Day	Collaborative work with many other artists	Announced as "forthcoming" in May 2007. Was eventually released in October 2017 in the Radio Cineola - The Trilogy box set.

=== Singles ===
Year	Title	Chart positions								Album	Certifications (sales thresholds)
Year	Title	UK	AUS	GER	IRE	NED	NOR	NZ	US Alt	Album	Certifications (sales thresholds)
1980	"Controversial Subject"	—	—	—	—	—	—	—	—		
1981	"Cold Spell Ahead"	—	—	—	—	—	—	—	—		
1982	"Uncertain Smile"	68	43	—	—	—	—	—	—	Soul Mining	
1983	"Perfect"	79	—	—	—	—	—	19	—		
1983	"This Is the Day"	71	—	—	—	—	—	—	—	Soul Mining	BPI: Silver
1983	"Uncertain Smile" (re-issue)	100	—	—	—	31	—	—	—	Soul Mining	
1986	"Sweet Bird of Truth"	88	—	—	—	—	—	19	—	Infected	
1986	"Heartland"	29	—	—	26	—	—	—	—	Infected	
1986	"Infected"	48	24	—	29	—	—	—	—	Infected	
1987	"Slow Train to Dawn" (featuring Neneh Cherry)	64	95	—	19	—	—	—	—	Infected	
1987	"Sweet Bird of Truth" (UK re-issue)	55	—	—	—	—	—	—	—	Infected	
1989	"The Beat(en) Generation"	18	50	82	8	—	—	4	13	Mind Bomb	
1989	"Gravitate to Me"	63	147	—	28	—	—	27	15	Mind Bomb	
1989	"Armageddon Days Are Here (Again)"	70	—	—	—	—	—	—	—	Mind Bomb	
1989	"Kingdom of Rain"	—	—	—	—	—	—	—	16	Mind Bomb	
1990	"Jealous of Youth"	—	—	—	—	—	—	—	7	Solitude	
1991	Shades of Blue (EP)	54	87	—	—	—	—	—	—		
1993	"Dogs of Lust"	25	70	—	18	—	7	16	2	Dusk	
1993	"Slow Emotion Replay"	35	173	—	—	—	—	—	—	Dusk	
1993	"Love Is Stronger Than Death"	39	—	—	—	—	—	—	14	Dusk	
1993	Dis-Infected (EP)	17	—	—	28	—	—	—	—		
1995	"I Saw the Light"	31	—	—	—	—	—	—	24	Hanky Panky	
2000	"Shrunken Man"	—	—	—	—	—	—	—	—	NakedSelf	
2007	"Mrs Mac"	—	—	—	—	—	—	—	—		
2017	"We Can't Stop What's Coming"	—	—	—	—	—	—	—	—		
2020	"I Want 2 B U"	—	—	—	—	—	—	—	—	Muscle	
2023	"$1 One Vote!"	—	—	—	—	—	—	—	—		
2024	"Cognitive Dissident"	—	—	—	—	—	—	—	—	Ensoulment	
2024	"Linoleum Smooth to the Stockinged Foot"	—	—	—	—	—	—	—	—	Ensoulment	
2024	"Some Days I Drink My Coffee by the Grave of William Blake"	—	—	—	—	—	—	—	—	Ensoulment	
"—" denotes singles that did not chart or were not released.

See also: Solitude (EP) which was released in December 1999 and contained remixes of the The songs—most notably, "That Was the Day," a version of their single, "This Is the Day".
