= Dusk (The The album) =

Studio album by The The
- Released: 25 January 1993
- Recorded: 1992
- Genre: Alternative rock
- Length: 41:02
- Label: Sony
- Producers: Matt Johnson; Bruce Lampcov

The The chronology
Mind Bomb (1989)	Dusk (1993)	Solitude (1993)

Singles from Dusk
- 1. "Dogs of Lust" Released: 4 January 1993; 2. "Slow Emotion Replay" Released: 5 April 1993; 3. "Love Is Stronger Than Death" Released: 7 June 1993

Dusk is the fourth studio album by English rock band the The. It was recorded in 1992 and released by Sony Records on 25 January 1993. The album peaked at No. 2 in the United Kingdom, their highest position to date, and at No. 142 in the United States. In 2002 the album was reissued in remastered form on CD. It is the band's final album to feature guitarist Johnny Marr.

== Cover art ==
The album's cover was designed by artist Andy Dog Johnson, Matt's brother.

== Reception ==
Professional ratings
Review scores
Source	Rating
AllMusic	4/5 stars
Chicago Tribune	3.5/4 stars
Entertainment Weekly	C
Mojo	5/5 stars
NME	8/10
Q	4/5 stars
Rolling Stone	4/5 stars
Select	4/5

Dusk received positive reviews. In the NME, Terry Staunton wrote, "It can be a struggle at first, as Johnson never lets up from his blacker-than-black world-view, but Dusk is a rich and hugely rewarding experience which draws you to its cold bosom again and again." In Melody Maker David Bennun observed that it was "a remarkably straightforward album" for Johnson and wrote, "Like Nick Cave, Johnson protects himself from the ridicule he invites with bombastic self-caricature. When he lets this slip, he's left with an album that, although frequently absorbing, is still as inherently laughable as any the The album. Dusk needs time to grow; it deserves it. But while it takes it, the 'Dogs of Lust' are closing in, howling with mirth." Sam Samuelson of AllMusic declared it one of Johnson's "most accomplished products to date." "Slow Emotion Replay" was the 94th best-selling single in Iceland.

== Track listing ==
Tracks written by Matt Johnson.

1. "True Happiness This Way Lies" – 3:10
2. "Love Is Stronger than Death" – 4:38
3. "Dogs of Lust" – 3:09
4. "This Is the Night" – 3:50
5. "Slow Emotion Replay" – 3:55
6. "Helpline Operator" – 4:48
7. "Sodium Light Baby" – 3:45
8. "Lung Shadows" – 4:34
9. "Bluer Than Midnight" – 3:43
10. "Lonely Planet" – 5:27

== Personnel ==
- Matt Johnson – lead vocals, electric guitar, acoustic guitar, keyboards
- Johnny Marr – electric guitar, acoustic guitar, harmonica, backing vocals
- James Eller – bass guitar
- David Palmer – drums
- D. C. Collard – keyboards
- Vinnie Colaiuta – drums
- Bruce Smith – drums
- Danny Thompson – upright bass on "This Is the Night"
- John Thirkle – trumpet on "Helpline Operator"
- David Lawrence – flugelhorn on "Lung Shadows"
- Ashley Slater – trombone on "Lung Shadows"
- Chris Batchelor – trumpet on "Lung Shadows"
- Guy Barker – trumpet on "Bluer Than Midnight"
- Paul Webb, Zeke Manyika – chorus on "Lonely Planet"

== Charts ==
Chart performance for Dusk
Chart (1993)	Peak position
Australian Albums (ARIA)	20
Austrian Albums (Ö3 Austria)	28
Canada Top Albums/CDs (RPM)	34
Dutch Albums (Album Top 100)	37
German Albums (Offizielle Top 100)	23
New Zealand Albums (RMNZ)	6
Norwegian Albums (VG-lista)	10
Swedish Albums (Sverigetopplistan)	15
Swiss Albums (Schweizer Hitparade)	20
UK Albums (Official Charts)	2
US Billboard 200	138
