= Hanky Panky (The The album) =

Studio album by the The
- Released: 14 February 1995 (US); 20 February 1995 (UK)
- Studio: The War Room, Pittsburgh
- Label: 550 Music/Epic
- Producer: Matt Johnson, Bruce Lampcov

The The chronology
Solitude (1993)	Hanky Panky (1995)	Gun Sluts (1997)

Singles from Hanky Panky
- 1. "I Saw the Light" Released: 23 January 1995

Hanky Panky is the fifth studio album by English band the The, released on 14 February 1995. It consists of cover versions of country singer Hank Williams' songs. It reached No. 28 on the UK Albums Chart. Matt Johnson intended Hanky Panky to be the first of many albums he would record covering the work of iconic musicians. Johnson provided the liner notes to Alone and Forsaken, a compilation of Williams demos that was also released in 1995.

== Production ==
Johnson originally planned to record an EP, and then a standard tribute album, with many musicians interpreting songs, before settling on an album of covers. Eric Schermerhorn played guitar on the album. Some songs contain only voice and harmonium. The band was more interested in retaining the meaning of the songs rather than producing musical copies of them. "Your Cheatin' Heart" was performed in a rockabilly style.

== Critical reception ==
Professional ratings
Review scores
Source	Rating
AllMusic	3/5 stars
Calgary Herald	A
Chicago Tribune	3/4 stars
Entertainment Weekly	B+
The Indianapolis Star	3.5/4 stars
NME	2/10
Orlando Sentinel	4/5 stars
USA Today	3/4 stars
Vancouver Sun	4/5 stars

In a review rated 2 out of 10, NME wrote that "the The's homage to Hank Wiliams ... is unsuccessful" and the versions had "little of Williams' authentic edge". Entertainment Weekly wrote that "Johnson internalizes Williams' '50s despair and coughs it up as modernist melancholy." Trouser Press called the album "a tour de force tribute," writing that it "might have sunk to self-conscious gimmickry in less perceptive hands, but Johnson makes it work beautifully." The Chicago Tribune stated that it "drones with the overmiked rasp, sometime monotonous echo, and bluesy guitars that are the The's trademark."

The Independent determined that, "mostly, Hanky Panky demonstrates a misapprehension of Williams's art, the greatness of which lies, in part, in his ability to disguise darkness and loneliness in redemptively light settings." The Guardian noted that "gloomy rock replaces the original relaxed melodies, and Johnson's baritone evokes only one colour from Hank's mixed palette of emotions." The Calgary Herald concluded that "as has happened with the blues and rock in the '60s, it's taken a Brit to unearth the spirit, the soul, the songs of Hank Williams."

== Track listing ==
All tracks by Hank Williams; arrangements/re-arrangements by Matt Johnson and D. C. Collard

1. "Honky Tonkin'"
2. "Six More Miles"
3. "My Heart Would Know"
4. "If You'll Be A Baby To Me"
5. "I'm A Long Gone Daddy"
6. "Weary Blues From Waitin'"
7. "I Saw the Light"
8. "Your Cheatin' Heart"
9. "I Can't Get You Off of my Mind"
10. "There's a Tear in My Beer"
11. "I Can't Escape from You"

== Personnel ==
- Matt Johnson – vocals, guitar, bass
- Eric Schermerhorn – electric & slide guitar
- Gail Ann Dorsey – bass
- Reverend Brian McLeod – drums
- Gentleman Jim Fitting – harmonica
- D.C. Collard – treated melodica, arrangements
