= Burning Blue Soul =

- Original 1981 cover

Studio album by Matt Johnson
- Released: 7 September 1981
- Recorded: Spring–summer 1981
- Genre: Post-punk; acid folk; new wave; gothic rock
- Length: 44:16
- Label: Warner Bros., 4AD
- Producer: Matt Johnson, Ivo Watts-Russell, Pete Maben, BC Gilbert & G Lewis

Matt Johnson chronology
Spirits (1979)	Burning Blue Soul (1981)	Soul Mining (1983)

Alternative cover
- 1983 reissue cover

Alternative cover
- 1993 The The reissue cover

Professional ratings
Review scores
Source	Rating
AllMusic	4/5 stars
Mojo	4/5 stars

Burning Blue Soul is the debut studio album by the English singer-songwriter Matt Johnson, released in 1981. The album is commonly regarded as an accomplished debut, with a mix of guitar riffs, tape loops, experimental electronics and heavily filtered vocals.

The album was re-released in 1993 under Johnson's band's name, the The. Johnson requested that 4AD do this so that all his albums would be racked together in record stores.

Despite rumours to the contrary, all releases of Burning Blue Soul contain the same mix.

== Background ==
The album was made on a budget of £1,800 with Matt Johnson living on benefits in "a tiny bedsit and no money.", due to these circumstances he "would beg, steal or borrow time at the studio I used to work for". Johnson was influenced by musique concrète and tape manipulation at the time of the album's creation, with the majority of the album being created on tape loops as it predated sampling technology. Along with the knowledge he learnt from people working for De Wolfe he would become fascinated with a book by Terence Dwyer called Composing With Tape, which he described as "a bit of a bible" for him. Johnson would then save up for a reel to reel recorder which he would cut up with "little razor blades", creating and incorporating "unusual percussion loops and a lot of third world instruments." This directly influenced the album's sound as well as the "few foot pedals" he was able to afford. which were "a distortion pedal, a tremolo pedal and an echo pedal, and maybe a wah-wah." He described the album as having "a very limited tonal palate."

== Recording ==
The first tracks to be recorded were “Time Again For The Golden Sunset” and “The River Flows East In Spring”, which he worked on with Bruce Gilbert and Graham Lewis, both members of post punk band Wire, for production. Lewis and Gilbert did not produce any other tracks, with Ivo Watts-Russell telling Johnson that he could do it himself as he had "plenty of ideas". Johnson worked with Ivo on the tracks "Icing Up” and “Another Boy Drowning” in Cambridge. The tracks that Matt Johnson self produced were the opening track "Red Cinders in the Sand" and "Delirious" which he worked on with engineer Pete Maben in Forest Gate.

== Reception ==
Roch Parisien of AllMusic praised the album and felt it "thrives on the tension between accessible pop and dissonant experimentation; between joyful wonder and despairing bleakness." calling it "a valuable sketchbook for The The fans interested in dissecting the early inner workings of Johnson's art, but the meandering tape-collages that serve as framework will leave most others cold."

John of Obladada described it as "everything from Roland Kayn, Flying Saucer Attack, Boredoms, Eno, Joakim Skogberg, and Syd Barrett. A stew of acid folk, strangely twisted electronics, and tape collage." Pitchfork claimed it was "Inhabiting a shadowy interzone between goth, new wave, and punk, Burning Blue Soul manages to plumb depths that Robert Smith and Peter Murphy could only lightly touch upon."

== Track listing ==
All tracks composed by Matt Johnson

1. "Red Cinders in the Sand" – 5:42
2. "Song Without an Ending" – 4:35
3. "Time (Again) for the Golden Sunset" – 3:51
4. "Icing Up" – 7:36
5. "(Like a) Sun Rising Through My Garden" – 5:01
6. "Out of Control" – 2:01
7. "Bugle Boy" – 2:27
8. "Delirious" – 3:33
9. "The River Flows East in Spring" – 3:33
10. "Another Boy Drowning" – 5:53

== Personnel ==
- Matt Johnson – vocals, producer, instrumentation
- Ivo Watts-Russell – producer (tracks 2, 4–8, 10)
- B.C. Gilbert & G. Lewis – producers (tracks 3 & 9)
- B.C. Gilbert – guitar (track 9)
- Graham Lewis – "karate chop" piano (track 9)
- Pete Maben – producer (track 1)
- Andy Johnson – artwork, illustrations
- Neville Brody – original artwork
- Fiona Skinner – design & layout, typography. Bespoke typeface – hand cut in lino. Hand tinted photo. Inner sleeve & back cover design
- Darren Laws – original 1981 (psychedelic eye) cover photography;
- AJ Barrett – photography, portrait photography (1983 issue)
- Ian Pye – liner notes (1993 issue)
- Howie Weinberg – digital remastering (CD issue)
