= Mind Bomb =

Studio album by The The
- Released: 15 May 1989 (UK); 11 July 1989 (US)
- Genres: Alternative rock, dance-rock, college rock
- Length: 45:59
- Label: Epic
- Producers: Warne Livesey, Roli Mosimann, Matt Johnson

The The chronology
Infected (1986)	Mind Bomb (1989)	Dusk (1993)

Singles from Mind Bomb
- 1. "The Beat(en) Generation" Released: 1989; 2. "Gravitate to Me" Released: 1989; 3. "Armageddon Days Are Here (Again)" Released: 1989; 4. "Kingdom of Rain" Released: 1989

Professional ratings
Review scores
Source	Rating
AllMusic	4.5/5 stars
Chicago Tribune	3.5/4 stars
The Encyclopedia of Popular Music	2/5 stars
MusicHound Rock: The Essential Album Guide	5/5 stars
Rolling Stone	3/5 stars
The Rolling Stone Album Guide	2.5/5 stars

Mind Bomb is the third studio album by the English post-punk band the The. It was recorded late 1988 and early '89, and released by Some Bizzare/Epic on 15 May 1989. Mind Bomb is the first of two The The albums to feature guitarist Johnny Marr as a band member.

Critical reception was mixed to positive, and the album peaked at No. 4 on the UK Albums Chart.

== Overview ==
Matt Johnson assembled a full band of the The, retaining his role as singer, primary songwriter, frontman and guitarist (and playing keyboards and other instruments in the studio), and bringing in guitarist Johnny Marr. Johnson had known Marr since the early 1980s, and had attempted to entice him into an earlier version of the The prior to Marr forming the Smiths. Completing the lineup was former Julian Cope band bass guitarist James Eller and session drummer David Palmer (while D.C. Collard provided live keyboards). Additional instrumentation on Mind Bomb was provided by sessioneers, most notably keyboard player Wix.

Instead of the darkly polished dance-pop styling of earlier albums Soul Mining and Infected, Mind Bomb opens up the music to reveal a slow, winding textured world of sound, thanks in no small measure to Marr. Lyrical subjects include politics, religion, and romance. The band would also play a world tour and record a follow-up, Dusk. After that, Johnson dissolved it and went about his business alone again. A remastered version of the album was released in 2002.

== Critical reception ==
The Quietus called the album "slow, expansive, looming into inexorable life with a rage that smouldered rather than flamed." The Encyclopedia of Popular Music called it "bombastic in tone and filled with lyrical diatribes and anti-religious rants allied to distinctly unmelodic songs." The Los Angeles Times called it "an embarrassing exercise in breast-beating," writing that "this bloated record is doubly distressing considering that it’s the work of the same man who turned out one of the most mysterious and lovely pop tunes of the ‘80s, 'Uncertain Smile'." In a retrospective review, Stylus Magazine wrote that "it’s easy to let the seemingly prescient relevance of the lyrics to Mind Bomb outweigh the actual music, which would be a shame because, with or without those words, it’s still a great record."

== Track listing ==
Tracks written by Matt Johnson, except where noted.

1. "Good Morning, Beautiful" – 7:28
2. "Armageddon Days Are Here (Again)" – 5:40
3. "The Violence of Truth" – 5:40
4. "Kingdom of Rain" – 5:51
5. "The Beat(en) Generation" – 3:04
6. "August & September" – 5:45
7. "Gravitate to Me" – 8:09 (Johnson, Johnny Marr)
8. "Beyond Love" – 4:22

== Personnel ==
=== The band ===
- Matt Johnson – vocals, guitar, keyboards
- Johnny Marr – guitar, harmonica
- James Eller – bass guitar
- David Palmer – drums

=== Additional musicians ===
- Sinéad O'Connor – vocals on "Kingdom of Rain"
- Wix Wickens – piano, keyboards, Hammond organ, accordion
- Warne Livesey – keyboards, banjo, acoustic guitar
- Pandit Dinesh – percussion
- Danny Cummings – percussion
- Pedro Haldermann – percussion
- Chris White – saxophone
- Philip Todd – saxophone
- Ashley Slater – trombone
- John Eacott – flugel horn
- Mark Feltham – harmonica
- Danny Thompson – upright bass on "August & September"
- Sarah Homer – clarinet
- Dai Pritchard – bass clarinet
- Hilary Storer – oboe
- Gavyn Wright – Arabian fiddle
- Astarti String Section – strings

=== Artwork ===
Artwork and typography by Fiona Skinner. Photography Andrew MacPherson. Back cover image was created to reference photomontagist John Heartfield Der Sinn von Genf The Meaning of Geneva AIZ Cover, Berlin, Germany, 1932

== Charts ==
Chart performance for Mind Bomb
Chart (1989)	Peak position
Australian Albums (ARIA)	32
Canada Top Albums/CDs (RPM)	55
Dutch Albums (Album Top 100)	39
German Albums (Offizielle Top 100)	24
New Zealand Albums (RMNZ)	3
Swedish Albums (Sverigetopplistan)	30
UK Albums (Official Charts)	4
US Billboard 200	138
