= Tim Pope =

British music video director (born 1956)

Timothy Michael Pope (born 12 February 1956) is a film director most known for his music videos, for having directed feature films, and for a brief pop career.

== Early life and career ==
Pope grew up in the north London suburb of Enfield. Both his parents were bankers, and he has a sister, Amanda. He always knew that he wanted to make films, boasting in an interview once, "Even my dreams came with dirt on them, like my Standard-8 movies". He attended St Andrew's primary school, Cecil Road, Enfield, and then went to St Michael's boarding school in Otford, Kent, returning to north London to attend Latymer Grammar School, Haselbury Road. While still attending Latymer, he participated in the first ever Film Studies O-level and was featured in the Evening Standard as "Tim Pope, aged seventeen, who wants to be a film director".

To achieve this aim, he began to attend Saturday morning film classes at Hornsey College of Art. Here he was able to experiment freely with cameras, spending much time photographing various happenings. His first school film was entitled Voyage, which was shot on a 16mm Bolex camera – and another equally absurd creation was the film Canine Excrement, where he is purported to have followed a dog around the then bombsites of Seven Sisters, waiting for the inevitable to happen.

Pope applied to many film colleges, realising that film was something he seriously wanted to devote his life to and, having been turned down by many, he finally attended Ravensbourne College of Art & Design, Bromley. The course was more TV-oriented, and Pope achieved his highest course marks when a brief was set to create an idea to a piece of music. He chose Frank Zappa's "I'm the Slime" from his album Over-Nite Sensation (1973).

When Pope left college, two years later, he found himself unemployable and, after a period of working for Williams & Glyn's Bank in Islington, he got his first job with HyVision, a company in Covent Garden that trained politicians to appear on TV. One of the many people he worked with, apart from Trevor McDonald, Melvyn Bragg, and others, was the then Chancellor of the Exchequer Denis Healey, whom his boss, Stanley Hyland, trained to appear on the BBC's Panorama programme. Pope says that he left 10 Downing Street with the same camera and then went to Guildford to film the ska band The Specials on stage. Terry Hall, the lead singer, was later to be one of Pope's many clients, as a pop promo director.

== Middle career ==
While still at HyVision, in 1979 Pope met Alex McDowell, who ran Rocking Russian, a company that designed T-shirts and record sleeves from a studio in Berwick Street. Alex had designed Iggy Pop's album sleeve for Soldier and Pope was a massive Iggy Pop fan. The duo went on to form a very successful and long-lasting relationship with McDowell as production designer and Pope as director – before McDowell emigrated to America in the mid-1980s to become a movie production designer for directors such as Steven Spielberg and Tim Burton.

At about this time, pop videos were starting to be made more frequently by directors like Russell Mulcahy (Duran Duran), David Mallet (David Bowie), and Brian Grant (Olivia Newton-John). Pope decided to turn his hand to this new form. His first attempts at rock video were shot in Carnaby Street and in Putney Bridge's tunnels on a non-broadcast format for the single "Cut Out the Real" by Jo Broadbery and the Standouts, as well as its B-side. After unsuccessfully pitching many videos (and with very little to show as his own work), he was finally engaged to make Soft Cell's first video for Some Bizzare Records, Non-Stop Exotic Video Show, which was a companion release to their debut album Non-Stop Erotic Cabaret. The collection was originally issued on VHS, Betamax, and laserdisc in 1982, and re-issued on DVD in 2004. The video for "Bedsitter" had Pope's trademark individuality, as it featured the band's singer, Marc Almond, wearing shirts that matched the walls behind him. In many ways, it is considered this video bears all the major hallmarks of a Pope video: individuality, linear progression in terms of story, and a slight psychedelic feel. (Pope has many names for different genres of videos and this type he calls a narrative/atmospheric. He has lectured all over the world on the subject, including at London's National Film Theatre.)

More Some Bizzare videos followed with Soft Cell, including "Say Hello and Wave Goodbye" and thereafter an entire album of videos for their debut album Non-Stop Erotic Cabaret, including "Sex Dwarf" that featured a handful of real-life prostitutes, and a handful of maggots that Pope threw in; The video was later seized by the Scotland Yard Pornography Squad.

== Videos for the Cure ==
By 1982, and with a few more videos made, (Scottish band Altered Images, Nancy Nova, Jersey pub-rockers-financed-by-a-millionaire "Volcano", etc.) Pope met The Cure's singer Robert Smith. Their work together was to prove that directors could be constantly innovative, on a factory-line basis. Pope ultimately directed over 37 videos for the group, including many of their most famous songs – "Let's Go To Bed" (1982), "Close To Me" (1985), "Just Like Heaven" (1987), "Friday I'm in Love", (1992), "Wrong Number" (1997). He also directed the 35mm movie of The Cure in Orange, which captures their performance at the eponymous theatre in the south of France.

== "I Want to be a Tree" ==
Pope released his own song in 1984, "I Want to be a Tree", The single's b-side was "The Double Crossing of Two-Faced Fred" (a choral verse poem he had written and performed at Latymer, a few years earlier) and, on the 12" version, "Elephants".

Pope described the project as "a real piss-take of what was going on in America", prompted by people referring to "Tim Pope Videos", and said that he "felt really strongly that they were not Tim Pope videos, they were Cure videos or Siouxsie videos or whatever". Over the 1983 Christmas holidays, Pope and a friend, Charles Gray, recorded what Pope described as "this really stupid song" that they had co-written years earlier as teenagers. Pope made an accompanying video for his showreel, asking several of the artists he worked with (the Cure, Siouxsie and the Banshees, Soft Cell, Talk Talk, The Style Council, Paul Young and Freur) to "come along and slag me off on the showreel". He then played the artists the song, while filming their reactions to it. The Old Grey Whistle Test screened the video, which Pope says resulted in several record deals being offered.

In between commitments to the Cure, The Glove and Siouxsie and the Banshees, Robert Smith found time to play most of the instruments on a new recording of "I Want To Be A Tree". It was released on the Fiction label and produced by its manager Chris Parry.

== Work in the U.S. ==
Pope was invited to the United States for the first time in 1983 by Neil Young who asked him to film the video for his song "Wonderin'". Young personally drove him around Los Angeles on a guided tour to see the sights, using the car that was ultimately to feature in the famous "Wonderin'" video, filmed with its idiosyncratic speed-up, speed-down style. Pope shot many more videos for Young until 1997. He said of the experience: "I thought it was everyone’s lot to be brought to America and driven around by iconic pop stars in flash motors."

He also shot many more videos in the United States for various bands, including Hall & Oates, Iggy Pop and Wendy & Lisa, as well as more bands in the UK: The The, David Bowie, Strawberry Switchblade, Men Without Hats, Talk Talk, Paul Weller, Siouxsie and the Banshees and others.

Pope's career in commercials began at this time, too, and he soon achieved a worldwide reputation, shooting for clients all over the world.

In 1989, Pope directed the TV comedy series The Groovy Fellers which he co-wrote with Squeeze keyboardist and TV presenter Jools Holland and comedian Rowland Rivron, about a Martian (played by Rivron) who lands in England and is shown around the country by Holland, being presented with many of the eccentricities of life peculiar to the United Kingdom. The TV series was one of the first to use members of the public and also featured David Steel, Michael Heseltine and Sir Patrick Moore. The Martian lands naked in episode 1, walks into a pub, and the series climaxes with a car chase with Holland and the Martian attempting to answer the question "Why are we here on Planet Earth?" with the police in hot pursuit. The programme was produced by Border Television for Channel 4.

== Later career ==
In 1991, Pope directed his first short film, Phone, starring Bill Pullman, Linda Blair, and Amanda Plummer. The film earned many awards from around the world, and was based on a real-life phone prank that Pope came across on a tape in a skip behind a strip club in Hollywood Boulevard.

He continued working on videos, spending more time in America. He worked with many new bands of the period, though old clients such as Neil Young, David Bowie, The The and The Cure continued to request his services.

In 1996, Bob and Harvey Weinstein asked Pope to direct The Crow: City of Angels for their production company, Miramax; both were fans of Phone. The Crow: City of Angels put Pope together again with production designer Alex McDowell and the duo gave the film an individual look and feel. It reached number one in the American movie charts, though Pope refused to do the commentary on the DVD, saying the studio had tampered with his film too much.

He directed David Bowie's 50th birthday celebration at Madison Square Garden in 1997, working with Bowie to construct the show over a long period. The show featured other artists, including Pope's old friend Robert Smith, Billy Corgan of the Smashing Pumpkins, Frank Black, the Foo Fighters and Lou Reed.

Shortly afterwards, Pope read and bought the rights for The Last King of Scotland and brought Oscar winner Forest Whitaker to the project as Idi Amin (though he left the project due to differences on the progress of the film, in particular with the studio wanting to use writer Joe Penhall).

== 2000 to present ==
Pope returned to London from Hollywood and continued with his career making commercials.

In 2005, Pope was awarded a CADS lifetime achievement award by the music industry and after a prolonged and self-imposed period of 12 years, he returned to making videos again, working with The Darkness, KT Tunstall, Kaiser Chiefs and Fatboy Slim.

In March 2008, Pope re-united with Neil Young to film In London which captures Young and his band during their multi-night engagement at the Hammersmith Odeon. The film was premiered in 2019 on Young's personal archives site.

In 2013, Pope embarked with The Cure to film their "LatAm" tour across South America and Mexico, and a tour film is expected to be produced later with material both off and on stage.

In 2018, Pope filmed a documentary on Sheridan Smith called Sheridan Smith: Coming Home.

On July 7, 2018 Pope directed the "Anniversary: 1978-2018 - Live in Hyde Park London" concert the Cure performed as part of the British Summer Time concert series. The concert was released on dvd as part of the six disc set of "Curaetion 25 - Anniversary", released in October 2019.

He directed The The's The Comeback Special - Live at the Royal Albert Hall in 2018. It was released on dvd/blu ray in October 2021.

== Personal life ==
He now lives with his family in Henfield in West Sussex.

== Music video filmography (incomplete) ==
- Adrian Belew and David Bowie "Pretty Pink Rose" (1990)
- Altered Images "I Could Be Happy" (1981)
- Amanda Palmer "The Killing Type" (2012)
- Bad Manners "Samson and Delilah" (1982)
- The Bangles "Eternal Flame" (1988)
- The Beautiful South "Good as Gold (Stupid as Mud)" (1994)
- Blancmange "That's Love, That It Is" (1983)
- Blue Zoo "Cry Boy Cry" (1982)
- Bonnie Tyler and Todd Rundgren "Loving You's a Dirty Job but Somebody's Gotta Do It" (1985)
- Bow Wow Wow "Do You Wanna Hold Me" (1983)
- Bronski Beat "C'mon! C'mon!" (1986)
- Bryan Ferry "Help Me" (1986)
- Bryan Ferry and David Gilmour "Is Your Love Strong Enough" (Legend soundtrack) (1986)
- The Cars "Magic" (1984)
- China Crisis "Wishful Thinking" (1983)
- China Crisis "Christian" (1983)
- The Christians "Words" (1989)
- The Christians "I Found Out" (1990)
- The Creatures "Miss the Girl" (1983)
- The Creatures "Right Now" (1983)
- The Cure "Let's Go to Bed" (1982)
- The Cure "The Love Cats" (1983)
- The Cure "The Walk" (1983)
- The Cure "The Caterpillar" (1984)
- The Cure "Close to Me" (1985)
- The Cure "In Between Days" (1985)
- The Cure "Killing an Arab" (1986)
- The Cure "Boys Don't Cry" (1986)
- The Cure "Jumping Someone Else's Train" (1986)
- The Cure "A Night Like This" (1986)
- The Cure "In Orange" (1986)
- The Cure "Catch" (1987)
- The Cure "Why Can't I Be You?" (1987)
- The Cure "Just Like Heaven" (1987)
- The Cure "Hot Hot Hot!!!" (1988)
- The Cure "Lullaby" (1989)
- The Cure "Fascination Street" (1989)
- The Cure "Lovesong" (1989)
- The Cure "Pictures of You" (1990)
- The Cure "Close to Me · Remix" (1990)
- The Cure "Never Enough" (1990)
- The Cure "Friday I'm in Love" (1992)
- The Cure "High" (1992)
- The Cure "Wrong Number" (1997)
- The Darkness "One Way Ticket" (2005)
- The Darkness "Is It Just Me?" (2006)
- The Darkness "Girlfriend" (2006)
- David Bowie "Time Will Crawl" (1987)
- David Bowie "I Can't Read" (1997)
- David Bowie "Space Oddity" (2019)
- Dead or Alive "I'd Do Anything" (1983)
- The Dream Academy "Life in a Northern Town" (1984)
- Everything but the Girl "When All's Well" (1985)
- Faith Brothers "A Stranger on Home Ground" (1985)
- Fatboy Slim "Slash Dot Dash" (2004)
- Frankmusik "Better Off as Two" (2009)
- Freur "Doot-Doot" (1983)
- Hall & Oates "Adult Education" (1984)
- Hazell Dean "Back in My Arms (Once Again)" (1984)
- Herbert Grönemeyer "Full Moon" (1988)
- Ian McCulloch "Proud to Fall" (1989)
- James "Sometimes" (1993)
- Jim Noir "Eanie Meany" (2006)
- John Parr "Magical" (1985)
- Josh Abrahams and Amiel Daemion "Addicted to Bass" (2002)
- Julian Lennon "Say You're Wrong" (1985)
- Kaiser Chiefs "Everyday I Love You Less and Less" (2005)
- Kim Wilde "Dancing in the Dark" (1983)
- Kissing the Pink "Watching Their Eyes" (1982)
- Kissing the Pink "Mr. Blunt" (1982)
- Kissing the Pink "Radio On" (1984)
- KT Tunstall "Another Place to Fall" (2006)
- Les Rita Mitsouko and Sparks "Singing in the Shower" (1988)
- Live "I Alone" (version 1: Slow Motion version) (1994)
- Marc Almond "The Boy Who Came Back" (1984)
- Marc Almond "You Have" (1984)
- Marc Almond "Bitter Sweet" (1988)
- Marc Almond "A Kind of Love" (2017)
- Men Without Hats "I Like" (1983)
- Men Without Hats "The Safety Dance" (1983)
- Men Without Hats "Where Do the Boys Go?" (1984)
- Men Without Hats "Pop Goes the World" (1987)
- Men Without Hats "Moonbeam" (1987)
- Ministry "Revenge" (1983)
- Modern Romance "Walking in the Rain" (1983)
- The Mood "Paris Is One Day Away" (1982)
- The Mood "Don’t Stop" (1982)
- Ned's Atomic Dustbin "Not Sleeping Around" (1992)
- Neil Young "Touch the Night" (1986)
- Neil Young "Weight of the World" (1986)
- Neil Young "People on the Streets" (1986)
- Neil Young and Crazy Horse "This Town" (1996)
- Neil Young and the Shocking Pinks "Cry, Cry, Cry" (1983)
- Neil Young and the Shocking Pinks "Wonderin'" (1983)
- Nick Drake "River Man" (2004)
- The Nymphs "Sad and Damned" (1991)
- Paul McCartney "This One" (1989)
- Peter Murphy "The Sweetest Drop" (1992)
- Pop's Cool Love "Free Me" (1992)
- The Pretenders "2000 Miles" (1983)
- The Pretenders "Thin Line Between Love and Hate" (1983)
- The Psychedelic Furs "Love My Way" (1982)
- The Psychedelic Furs "Here Come Cowboys" (1984)
- The Psychedelic Furs "Heaven" (1984)
- The Psychedelic Furs "The Ghost in You" (1984)
- The Psychedelic Furs "Angels Don't Cry" (1986)
- Queen "It's a Hard Life" (1984)
- The Questions "Building on a Strong Foundation" (1984)
- Re-Flex "How Much Longer?" (1985)
- Reverend and the Makers "He Said He Loved Me" (2007)
- Ric Ocasek "Emotion in Motion" (1986)
- Rock and Hyde "Dirty Water" (1987)
- Roger Taylor "Man on Fire" (1984)
- Roman Holliday "Stand By" (1983)
- Roman Holliday "Don't Try to Stop It" (1983)
- Roman Holliday "Motormania" (1983)
- Rush "Afterimage" (1984)
- Seven Mary Three "Make Up Your Mind" (1997)
- Siouxsie and the Banshees "Dear Prudence" (1983)
- Siouxsie and the Banshees "Swimming Horses" (1984)
- Siouxsie and the Banshees "Dazzle" (1984)
- Siouxsie and the Banshees "Cities in Dust" (1985)
- Soft Cell "Frustration" (1980)
- Soft Cell "Tainted Love" (1981)
- Soft Cell "Bedsitter" (1981)
- Soft Cell "Memorabilia" (1981)
- Soft Cell "Secret Life" (1981)
- Soft Cell "Entertain Me" (1981)
- Soft Cell "Seedy Films" (1981)
- Soft Cell "Sex Dwarf" (Original Banned Version) (1982)
- Soft Cell "Say Hello, Wave Goodbye" (1982)
- Soft Cell "Torch" (1982)
- Soft Cell "What?" (1982)
- Soft Cell "Where the Heart Is" (1982)
- Soft Cell "Soul Inside" (1983)
- Soft Cell "Down in the Subway" (1984)
- Space Monkey "Can't Stop Running" (1983)
- Spear of Destiny "The Wheel" (1983)
- The Stranglers "96 Tears" (1990)
- Strawberry Switchblade "Since Yesterday" (1984)
- Strawberry Switchblade "Let Her Go" (1985)
- Stump "Charlton Heston" (1988)
- The Style Council "Speak Like a Child" (1983)
- The Style Council "Money-Go-Round" (1983)
- The Style Council "Long Hot Summer" (1983)
- The Style Council "A Solid Bond in Your Heart" (1983)
- The Style Council "My Ever Changing Moods" (1984)
- The Style Council "Groovin'" (1984)
- The Style Council "Shout to the Top!" (1984)
- The Style Council "Walls Come Tumbling Down!" (1985)
- Talk Talk "It's My Life" (1984)
- Talk Talk "Dum Dum Girl" (1984)
- Talk Talk "Such a Shame" (1984)
- Talk Talk "Life's What You Make It" (1985)
- Talk Talk "Living in Another World" (1986)
- Talk Talk "I Believe in You" (1988)
- The The "Twilight of a Champion" (1987)
- The The "Out of the Blue (Into the Fire)" (1987)
- The The "Slow Train to Dawn" (1987)
- The The "Gravitate to Me" (1989)
- The The "Kingdom of Rain" (1990)
- The The "Jealous of Youth" (1990)
- The The "Dogs of Lust (1993)
- The The "Slow Emotion Replay" (1993)
- The The "Love Is Stronger Than Death" (1993)
- The The "Pillar Box Red" (2002)
- Tim Pope "I Want to Be a Tree" (1984)
- Tim Scott McConnell "Swear" (1983)
- Tin Machine "You Belong in Rock n' Roll" (1991)
- Tin Machine "Baby Universal" (1991)
- Tom Tom Club "Suboceana" (1989)
- Tracie "Give It Some Emotion" (1983)
- Tygers of Pan Tang "Love Potion No. 9" (1982)
- Vegas "She" (1992)
- Vegas "Walk into the Wind" (1993)
- Visage "Pleasure Boys" (1982)
- Voice of the Beehive "I Walk the Earth" (1988)
- Wendy & Lisa "Waterfall" (1987)
- Wendy & Lisa "Sideshow" (1988)
- Wham! "Young Guns (Go for It)" (1982)
- Wilko Johnson and Roger Daltrey "I Keep It to Myself" (2014)
