= I Saw the Light (Hank Williams song) =

Single by Hank Williams With His Drifting Cowboys
- B-side: "Six More Miles (To the Graveyard)"
- Published: November 16, 1948 Acuff-Rose Publications
- Released: September 1948
- Recorded: April 21, 1947
- Studio: Castle Studio, Nashville
- Genre: Country gospel; gospel; hillbilly
- Length: 2:45
- Label: MGM
- Songwriter: Hank Williams
- Producer: Fred Rose

Hank Williams With His Drifting Cowboys singles chronology
"I'm a Long Gone Daddy" (1948)	"I Saw the Light" (1948)	"A Mansion on the Hill" (1948)

"I Saw the Light" is a country gospel song written by Hank Williams. Williams was inspired to write the song while returning from a concert by a remark his mother made while they were arriving in Montgomery, Alabama. He recorded the song during his first session for MGM Records, and released in September 1948. Williams' version did not enjoy major success during its initial release, but eventually it became one of his most popular songs and the closing number for his live shows. It was soon covered by other acts, and has become a country gospel standard and often a classic for summer camps.

In September 1946, Hank Williams auditioned for Nashville's Grand Ole Opry but was rejected. After the failure of his audition, Williams and his wife Audrey tried to interest the recently formed music publishing firm Acuff-Rose Music. Williams and his wife approached Fred Rose, who signed him to a six-song contract, and leveraged a deal with Sterling Records. In December 1946, Williams had his first recording session. The songs "Never Again (Will I Knock on Your Door)" and "Honky Tonkin'" became successful, and earned Williams the attention of MGM Records. His first MGM session took place on April 21, 1947. The first song he recorded was "Move It on Over". The second was "I Saw the Light".

== Composition ==
Williams was inspired to write the song in January 1947 while returning from a show in Fort Deposit, Alabama. His mother, Lilly, drove him and the band back to Montgomery that night. As she was approaching the city, she spotted the lights of Dannelly Field Airport. Williams, who slept inebriated in the backseat of the car, was roused by his mother, who told him "I just saw the light", announcing to him that they were close to Montgomery. He wrote the first draft on January 26, 1947. The lyrics and the melody by Williams closely resembled Albert E. Brumley's "He Set Me Free", published in 1939 and released in March 1941 by the Chuck Wagon Gang. Biblical citations were used, including the Gospels of Matthew and John, as well as excerpts from the First Epistle to the Thessalonians and Book of Revelation. As Williams' biographer Colin Escott astutely observes, while the melody and even some of the lyrics bear a passing resemblance to the earlier Brumley tune, "'I Saw the Light' wasn't just 'He Set Me Free' with new lyrics, though. It was the prayer of the backslider, who lives in hope of redemption."

== Recording and release ==
Williams recorded the song during his first session with MGM Records on April 21, 1947. The band was composed by part of Red Foley's backing, including Zeke and Zeb Turner (guitar), Brownie Raynolds (bass), Tommy Jackson (fiddle) and Smokey Lohman (steel guitar). Williams also recorded a version of the song during a later session with his wife, which he sent to Rose on August 19. In the accompanying letter, he discouraged the producer from issuing the recording. Audrey, like many people who sing badly, seemed to have no sense of how bad she was as a vocalist. Country-music biographer Colin Escott wrote, "Her duets with Hank were like an extension of their married life in that she fought him for dominance on every note."

While the release of Williams' recording was held, the first issued version was by Clyde Grubb, who recorded it on August 13, 1947. Grubb's version was released by RCA Records (RCA 20-2485) in October 1947 with "When God" on the flipside, backed by his Tennessee Valley Boys. Williams' version was released in September 1948, while it was later copyrighted on November 16. It was backed with "Six More Miles (To the Graveyard)" and issued on MGM Records (MGM 10271). Boys' Life favored the record, stating: "It's a typical Hank Williams lament, which you western and hillbilly fans will eat up". Hank Williams first appeared on the Kate Smith Evening Hour on March 26, 1952, and joined in with the rest of the cast singing "I Saw The Light."

== Legacy ==
"I Saw the Light" was not a commercial success upon its release but has since become his most recognized hymn and one of his most popular songs. The song became a standard for both the country music and gospel music genres, and has been covered by several artists of the two genres and beyond. Allmusic called it one of Williams' "finest songs concerning his strong religious conviction". It was ranked first in Country Music Television's 20 Greatest Songs of Faith in 2005. The 2015 Williams biopic starring Tom Hiddleston was named after the song.

Bob Dylan has also referred to it as a source for religious significance.

The University of Mississippi's 'Pride of the South' marching band performs a marching band arrangement of the song as part of their pregame repertoire. As many as 60,000 fans can be heard clapping along to the beat of the music.

The song is referenced in George Jones' 1985 single, "Who's Gonna Fill Their Shoes", using the line, "You can tell it when he sang "I Saw The Light"

== Cover versions and other media ==
- Roy Acuff covered the song in a recording session on November 11, 1947. The single was released by Columbia Records (#38109) in February 1948, with "Thank God" on the flipside. During Williams' funeral in 1953, Acuff led the singing of the song, while he was joined on the chorus by artists including Red Foley, Webb Pierce, Carl Smith and Bill Monroe among others present.
- Bill Monroe recorded the song in 1958, which he released as the title track of his first gospel album the same year.
- The Nitty Gritty Dirt Band recorded the song in collaboration with Roy Acuff 1971 for the album Will the Circle Be Unbroken. The collaboration reached number 56 on Billboard's Top Country Singles.
- Merle Haggard included it on his 1971 album The Land of Many Churches.
- Don Nix included the song on his 1971 album Living by the Days.
- In 1972, Earl Scruggs included it on his album I Saw the Light with Some Help from My Friends.
- In 1973, Tompall Glaser included a cover in his release Charlie.
- Chicago-based country band Mason Proffit released a cover version in 1973.
- New Orleans–based rock band Dash Rip Rock covered the song on their 1986 self-titled debut album.
- The The covered the song on their 1995 album Hanky Panky.
- Crystal Gayle included the song in her 1995 album Someday.
- David Crowder Band did a cover of the song for their album A Collision released in 2005.
- Josh Turner did a cover of the song for his 2018 album I Serve a Savior.
- In the drama Orange Is the New Black's episode "Can't Fix Crazy" the song is sung by some of the prisoners during their annual Christmas pageant with Annie Golden as Norma Romano being the featured soloist.
- The Christian rock band Attalus recorded a cover of this song as an extra, hidden track for the album Post Tenebras Lux.
- The song, sung by Johnny Cash, was featured prominently in the 1974 Columbo episode "Swan Song".
