= Andy Dog Johnson =

British artist (1959–2016)

- Born: Andrew Johnson; 6 January 1959; London
- Died: 18 January 2016 (aged 57)
- Education: Camberwell School of Art
- Known for: Illustrator

Andrew Johnson (6 January 1959 – 18 January 2016) was a British artist best known for designing Some Bizzare Records' record sleeves for artists The The, his brother Matt Johnson's band, in the 1980s and 1990s which were produced under the pseudonym Andy Dog. His work often featured tortured, grimacing figures coupled with dark, melancholic themes. His main medium was drawing and he consciously attempted to forge a new connection with the English Neo-Romantic movement of the early to mid 20th century.

He trained at Camberwell School of Art where he was taught by Charles Keeping. He contributed to many underground comics and magazines and also worked for the music press. He was responsible for establishing the visual identity of the Some Bizzare record label.

As a child, he worked with Joan Littlewood's Theatre Workshop at the Theatre Royal in Stratford, London. He also appeared in the film Bronco Bullfrog (1969). In the late 1970s, he fronted post-punk outfit Camera 3 and played alongside the band Crass.

In later years, Johnson lived and worked as an artist in East Anglia and in Lavenham, Suffolk. Johnson was diagnosed with an aggressive brain tumour in April 2012, and died on 18 January 2016. His brother Matt Johnson's band The The released the single 'We Can't Stop What's Coming' the same year and dedicated it to his life and work.
