= Matt Johnson (singer) =

British singer-songwriter (born 1961)

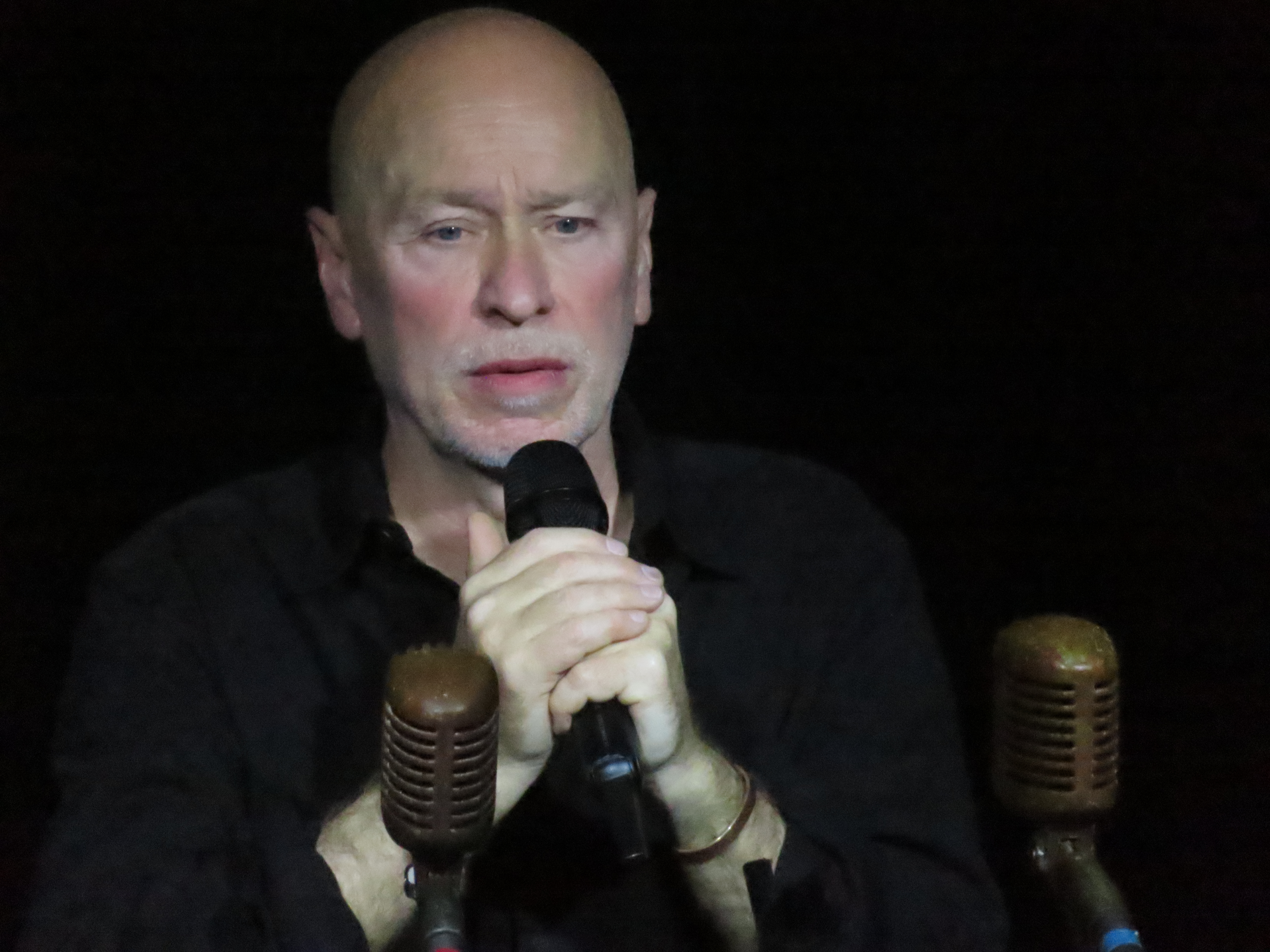
- Johnson at Rock City in Nottingham, 2024

Background information
- Born: Matthew Johnson; 15 August 1961 (age 65); London, England
- Genres: Alternative rock; post-punk; new wave
- Occupations: Singer; songwriter; producer; publisher
- Instruments: Vocals; guitar; keyboards; percussion
- Years active: 1979–present
- Labels: 4AD; Some Bizzare; Epic; Sony; Nothing; Lazarus; Cinéola
- Member of: The The
- Formerly of: Marc and the Mambas
- Website: thethe.com

Matthew Johnson (born 15 August 1961) is an English singer-songwriter best known as the lead vocalist and only constant member of his band the The. He is also a film soundtrack composer (Cinéola), publisher (Fifty First State Press), broadcaster (Radio Cineola), conservationist, and local activist.

== Early life ==
Johnson grew up with his three brothers, Eugene, Andrew (the artist Andy Dog Johnson), and Gerard in East London. Much of his youth was spent in or around the Two Puddings, a London pub run by his family over the course of 40 years.

== Music career ==
In 1979, Johnson placed an advert in NME looking for like-minded fans of the Velvet Underground, the Residents and Throbbing Gristle to form a band with him. The The began as a duo, then a four-piece, then a singular entity with a rotating cast of musicians that has included Sinéad O'Connor, Gail Ann Dorsey, Simon Fisher Turner, Johnny Marr of the Smiths, and David Palmer of ABC. "I like to think of the The as a fluid thing", Johnson said in a 1993 Melody Maker interview. "People can work with me, then stop for a bit, then work again."

In 1981, Johnson released the studio album Burning Blue Soul on 4AD under his own name (which has since been re-released under the name The The). In 1982, Marc and the Mambas released their debut studio album called Untitled and Johnson was part of the ensemble put together by Marc Almond of Soft Cell. By 1983, Johnson and Keith Laws signed to Some Bizzare Records, which arranged distribution with CBS Records. Some Bizzare subsequently released the The's debut studio album Soul Mining, now distributed by Sony Music. By 1986, Some Bizzare produced and released their second studio album Infected, which reached number 14 in the UK Albums Chart and remained in the chart for 30 weeks, making it the band's most commercially successful album to date. Infected: The Movie was the screen accompaniment to the album.

The The went on to release further albums through Sony Music including Mind Bomb (1989), Dusk (1993), Hanky Panky (1995), NakedSelf (2000) and compilation album 45 RPM: The Singles of The The (2002).

Johnson's younger brother Eugene died in 1989. The impact of this death on Matt Johnson and his creativity is a subject of the 2017 documentary The Inertia Variations, directed by Johanna St Michaels, which focuses on the life of Matt Johnson and the team who surround him. The film is named after an original collection of poetry by John Tottenham, and was later shortlisted for the 'Best Q Film' award in Q magazine's 'Q' Awards.

Despite not releasing any new music as the The over the course of 15 years prior to 2017, Johnson worked as founder and broadcaster of Radio Cinéola, and also heavily collaborated with his brother Gerard, composing the full soundtrack for two of Gerard's films; Tony (2009) and Hyena (2014).

To coincide with the 2017 release of The Inertia Variations, Johnson collaborated with Johnny Marr again and released the The's first single in over 15 years – "We Can't Stop What's Coming" under his own record label Cinéola. Johnson dedicated this track to his late brother Andy Dog Johnson who died in 2016.

As well as a new single, Johnson released the Radio Cinéola Trilogy box set on vinyl and CD format. In October 2017, the The also announced a comeback series of dates in June 2018 and played live at three venues in London, UK including the Royal Albert Hall. The The appeared as a headline act at Festival N°6 in 2018.

In November 2017, Johnson announced that he was hoping to form a new band and release new music by 2018.

=== 2018 comeback ===
In June 2018, the The kicked off the first three London dates of the tour, which was expanded in-flight to accommodate not only North America but also four Australian dates in both Sydney and Melbourne. The original line-up for the tour was:

- Matt Johnson – vocals, guitar
- Barrie "Little Barrie" Cadogan – lead guitar
- James Eller – bass
- Earl Harvin – drums, percussion
- D C Collard – keyboards

During the course of the tour the line-up was changed slightly only twice; due to prior commitments Earl Harvin was replaced for the Australian leg of the tour by Geoff Dugmore.

=== 2024 ===
In 2024, the The released an album, Ensoulment.
