= Iggy Pop discography =

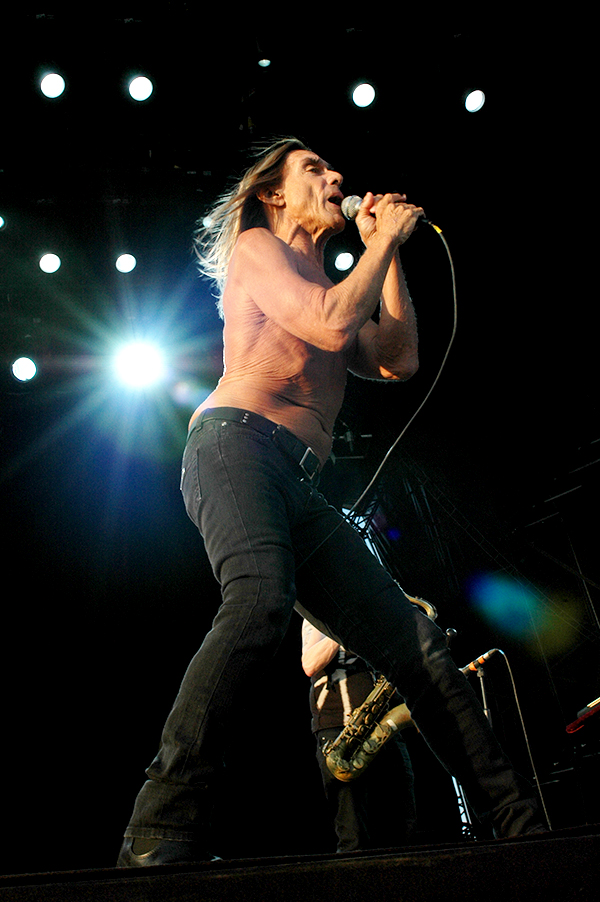
- Iggy Pop at the UK Hop Farm Festival, July 2011
- Studio albums: 20
- Extended plays: 1
- Soundtrack albums: 8
- Live albums: 6
- Compilation albums: 8
- Tribute albums: 5
- Singles: 69
- Box sets: 2
- Guest appearances: 47

This is the discography of American singer Iggy Pop. The following lists of all of Pop's released singles, studio albums, compilation albums, EPs and demos.

== Studio albums ==
- All releases are credited to Iggy Pop as solo works unless stated otherwise.

Year	Title	Chart positions									Certifications (sales thresholds)
Year	Title	US	AUS	CAN	GER	NZ	NLD	NOR	SWE	UK	Certifications (sales thresholds)
1977	The Idiot: Released: March 18, 1977; Label: RCA	72 [13 wks]	88	–	–	–	–	–	–	30 [3 wks]	
1977	Lust for Life: Released: September 9, 1977; Label: RCA	120 [6 wks]	–	–	–	–	8	–	–	28 [8 wks]	BPI: Gold
1977	Kill City (as 'Iggy Pop and James Williamson'): Released: November 1977; Label: Bomp!	204 [3 wks]	–	–	–	–	–	–	–	–	
1979	New Values: Released: April 27, 1979; Label: Arista	180 [4 wks]	36	–	–	–	–	–	37	60	
1980	Soldier: Released: February 1980; Label: Arista	125 [7 wks]	78	–	–	–	–	36	27	62	
1981	Party: Released: June 1981; Label: Arista	166 [5 wks]	93	–	–	–	–	–	–	–	
1982	Zombie Birdhouse: Released: September 1982; Label: Animal	–	–	–	–	–	–	–	–	–	
1986	Blah-Blah-Blah: Released: October 1986; Label: A&M	75 [27 wks]	34	61	51	19 [11 wks]	52	–	3	43 [7 wks]	MC: Gold
1988	Instinct: Released: June 1988; Label: A&M	110 [12 wks]	82	34	54	28 [7 wks]	–	–	20	61 [1 wk]	
1990	Brick by Brick: Released: June 1990; Label: Virgin	90 [37 wks]	81	83	34	–	43	19	13	50 [2 wks]	
1993	American Caesar: Released: September 1993; Label: Virgin	–	29	–	64	39 [1 wk]	81	–	2	43 [2 wks]	
1996	Naughty Little Doggie: Released: March 15, 1996; Label: Virgin	–	83	46	51	–	–	–	35	77	
1999	Avenue B: Released: September 20, 1999; Label: Virgin	–	–	–	27	–	–	–	–	105	
2001	Beat 'Em Up: Released: June 18, 2001; Label: Virgin	–	–	–	70	–	–	–	–	–	
2003	Skull Ring: Released: September 30, 2003; Label: Virgin	–	–	–	–	–	–	–	–	–	
2009	Préliminaires: Released: May 25, 2009; Label: Astralwerks, Virgin	187 [1 wk]	–	–	–	–	–	–	44	200 [1 wk]	
2012	Après: Released: May 9, 2012; Label: Thousand Mile Inc	–	–	–	61	–	–	–	–	–	
2016	Post Pop Depression: Released: March 18, 2016; Label: Caroline International/Loma Vista	17	7	16	8	11	5	10	13	5	
2019	Free: Released: September 6, 2019; Label: Caroline International/Loma Vista	–	91	–	13	–	47	–	–	26	
2023	Every Loser: Released: January 6, 2023; Label: Gold Tooth/Atlantic	–	72	–	2	–	58	–	–	33	

== EPs ==
Year	Title	Notes
2018	Teatime Dub Encounters	with Underworld

== Live albums ==
Year	Title
1978	TV Eye Live 1977: Released: May 1978; Label: RCA
1983	Live in San Fran 1981: Released: 1983; Label: Target Records; Released: April 19, 2005 (États-Unis); Label: MVD Audio / Thousand Miles
1995	Live at the Ritz, NYC 1986: Released: December 19, 1995; Label: New Rose Records
1996	Best Of...Live: Released: 1996; Label: MCA
2011	Roadkill Rising: The Bootleg Collection 1977–2009: Released: May 17, 2011; Label: Shout! Factory
2011	Live at the Old Waldorf: San Francisco – November 27, 1979 (Roadkill Rising bonus disc): Released: May 17, 2011; Label: Shout! Factory
2016	Post Pop Depression: Live at the Royal Albert Hall – May 13, 2016: Released: October 28, 2016; Label: Eagle Vision/Universal Music Group; (2CD+Blu-ray – video: 118 mins approx.); (2CD+DVD – video: 128 mins approx.)

== Compilation albums ==
Year	Title	Chart positions	Certifications (sales thresholds)
Year	Title	UK	Certifications (sales thresholds)
1991	Pop Songs: Released: 1991; Label: Arista	–	
1996	Nude & Rude: The Best of Iggy Pop: Released: October 28, 1996; Label: Virgin	99 [5 wks]	BPI: Silver
1996	Pop Music: Released: November 1996; Label: BMG/RCA Camden	–	
2000	Classic Iggy Pop: The Universal Masters Collection: Released: 2000; Label: Polygram/Universal	–	
2005	A Million in Prizes: The Anthology: Released: July 18, 2005; Label: Virgin	148 [1 wk]	BPI: Silver
2007	Where The Faces Shine – Volume 1: Released: January 26, 2007; Label: Easy Action – EARS 016	–	
2008	Where The Faces Shine – Volume 2: Released: 2008; Label: Easy Action – EARS018	–	
2015	Psychophonic Medicine: Released: June 23, 2015; Label: Cleopatra – CLP6805	–	

== Box sets ==
Year	Title	Notes
2011	Roadkill Rising	4-discs of official bootleg recordings spanning 1977–2009.
2020	The Bowie Years	7-discs including The Idiot, Lust for Life, TV Eye Live 1977, as well as unreleased live material/studio outtakes

== Singles ==
=== 1977–1988 ===
Year	Title	Chart positions									Certifications	Album
Year	Title	US Main	US Dance	AUS	NZ	NLD	BEL	GER	IRE	UK	Certifications	Album
1977	"Sister Midnight"	—	—	—	—	—	—	—	—	—		The Idiot
1977	"China Girl"	—	—	—	—	—	—	—	—	—		The Idiot
1977	"Success"	—	—	—	—	—	—	—	—	—		Lust for Life
1977	"Lust for Life"	—	—	—	—	4	6	—	—	—	BPI: Gold	Lust for Life
1977	"Consolation Prizes" (with James Williamson)	—	—	—	—	—	—	—	—	—		Kill City
1978	"Kill City" (with James Williamson)	—	—	—	—	—	—	—	—	—		Kill City
1978	"Some Weird Sin" (NLD only)	—	—	—	—	—	—	—	—	—		Lust for Life
1978	"I Got a Right"	—	—	—	—	—	—	—	—	—		TV Eye Live 1977
1979	"I'm Bored"	—	—	68	—	—	—	—	—	—		New Values
1979	"Five Foot One" b/w "Pretty Flamingo" (non-album track)	—	—	—	—	—	—	—	—	—		New Values
1980	"Loco Mosquito"	—	—	—	—	—	—	—	—	—		Soldier
1980	"Knocking 'em Down (In the City)"	—	—	—	—	—	—	—	—	—		Soldier
1980	"Dog Food"	—	—	—	—	—	—	—	—	—		Soldier
1981	"Bang Bang"	—	35	—	—	—	—	—	—	—		Party
1981	"Pumpin' for Jill"	—	—	—	—	—	—	—	—	—		Party
1982	"Run Like a Villain"	—	—	—	—	—	—	—	—	—		Zombie Birdhouse
1986	"Cry for Love"	34	19	50	—	—	—	—	—	—		Blah-Blah-Blah
1986	"Real Wild Child (Wild One)"	27	—	11	1	31	36	28	16	10		Blah-Blah-Blah
1987	"Shades"	—	—	—	—	—	—	—	—	87		Blah-Blah-Blah
1987	"Fire Girl"	—	—	—	—	—	—	—	—	—		Blah-Blah-Blah
1987	"Isolation"	—	—	—	—	—	—	—	—	—		Blah-Blah-Blah
1987	"I Got a Right" (FRA only)	—	—	—	—	—	—	—	—	—		Non-album single
1988	"Cold Metal"	37	—	—	—	—	—	—	—	—		Instinct
1988	"High on You"	—	—	114	—	—	—	—	—	—		Instinct
1988	"Easy Rider" (GER only)	—	—	—	—	—	—	—	—	—		Instinct
"—" denotes the single failed to chart or was not released.

=== 1990–2022 ===
Year	Title	Chart positions										Certifications	Album
Year	Title	US	US Main	US Alt	AUS	NZ	NLD	BEL	FRA	IRE	UK	Certifications	Album
1990	"Livin' on the Edge of the Night"	—	—	16	101	—	47	—	—	—	51		Brick by Brick
1990	"Home"	—	46	2	95	—	—	—	—	—	84		Brick by Brick
1990	"Candy" (with Kate Pierson)	28	30	5	9	39	7	10	—	—	67	ARIA: Gold	Brick by Brick
1990	"Butt Town"	—	—	—	—	—	—	—	—	—	—		Brick by Brick
1990	"Lust for Life / I Wanna Be Your Dog" (FRA only)	—	—	—	—	—	—	—	—	—	—		Hippodrome – Paris 77
1990	"The Passenger" (FRA only)	—	—	—	—	—	—	—	—	—	—		Hippodrome – Paris 77
1990	"Success" (USSR only)	—	—	—	—	—	—	—	—	—	—		Hippodrome – Paris 77
1991	"The Undefeated"	—	—	—	—	—	—	—	—	—	—		Brick by Brick
1991	"Well, Did You Evah!" (with Debbie Harry)	—	—	—	106	—	—	—	—	29	42		Red Hot + Blue
1992	"Some Weird Sin" (FRA only)	—	—	—	—	—	—	—	—	—	—		Live Ritz N.Y.C 86
1993	"In the Deathcar" (FRA only)	—	—	—	—	—	—	—	2	—	—		Arizona Dream OST
1993	"Wild America" b/w "Credit Card", "Come Back Tomorrow", "My Angel" (non-album tracks)	—	—	25	85	—	—	39	—	—	63		American Caesar
1993	"Louie Louie"	—	—	—	—	—	—	—	—	—	—		American Caesar
1994	"Beside You"	—	—	—	124	—	—	—	—	—	47		American Caesar
1995	"Family Affair" (demo, FRA only)	—	—	—	—	—	—	—	—	—	—		We Are Not Talking About Commercial Shit
1996	"Heart Is Saved" b/w "(Get Up I Feel Like Being a) Sex Machine (non-album track)	—	—	—	—	—	—	—	—	—	—		Naughty Little Doggie
1996	"To Belong"	—	—	—	—	—	—	—	—	—	—		Naughty Little Doggie
1996	"I Wanna Live"	—	—	—	—	—	—	—	—	—	—		Naughty Little Doggie
1996	"Lust for Life"	—	—	—	194	—	—	—	—	—	26		Nude & Rude: The Best of Iggy Pop
1997	"Monster Men"	—	—	—	125	—	—	—	—	—	—		Space Goofs BSO
1998	"The Passenger" (from Toyota Avensis TV commercial)	—	—	—	—	—	—	—	—	—	22	BPI: Platinum	Lust for Life
1999	"Corruption" b/w "Rock Star Grave", "Hollywood Affair" (non-album tracks)	—	—	—	—	—	—	—	—	—	100		Avenue B
2001	"Mask" b/w "Commercial Love", "Travelogue" (non-album tracks)	—	—	—	—	—	—	—	—	—	—		Beat 'Em Up
2001	"Football"	—	—	—	—	—	—	—	—	—	—		Beat 'Em Up
2003	"Little Know It All" (with Sum 41) b/w "Jose the Arab", "Ready to Run" (non-album tracks)	—	—	35	—	—	—	—	—	—	—		Skull Ring
2004	"Motor Inn" (with Feedom featuring Peaches)	—	—	—	—	—	—	—	—	—	—		Skull Ring
2009	"King of the Dogs"	—	—	—	—	—	—	—	—	—	—		Préliminaires
2012	"If I'm in Luck I Might Get Picked Up" (with Zig Zags)	—	—	—	—	—	—	—	—	—	—		non-album singles
2013	"Waiting for the D Train" (live, with Yoko Ono Plastic Ono Band)	—	—	—	—	—	—	—	—	—	—		non-album singles
2016	"Gardenia"	—	—	—	—	—	—	35	135	—	—		Post Pop Depression
2016	"Break into Your Heart"	—	—	—	—	—	—	—	—	—	—		Post Pop Depression
2016	"Sunday"	—	—	—	—	—	—	—	—	—	—		Post Pop Depression
2017	"Asshole Blues"	—	—	—	—	—	—	—	—	—	—		non-album singles
2017	"Red Right Hand" (with Jarvis Cocker)	—	—	—	—	—	—	—	—	—	—		non-album singles
2018	"Get Your Shirt"	—	—	—	—	—	—	—	—	—	—		Teatime Dub Encounters
2019	"Free"	—	—	—	—	—	—	—	—	—	—		Free
2019	"James Bond"	—	—	—	—	—	—	—	—	—	—		Free
2019	"Sonali"	—	—	—	—	—	—	—	—	—	—		Free
2019	"Loves Missing"	—	—	—	—	—	—	—	—	—	—		Free
2020	"Family Affair" (re-recorded version)	—	—	—	—	—	—	—	—	—	—		non-album single
2020	"Dirty Little Virus"	—	—	—	—	—	—	—	—	—	—		non-album single
2021	"European Son" (with Matt Sweeney)	—	—	—	—	—	—	—	—	—	—		I'll Be Your Mirror: A Tribute to The Velvet Underground & Nico
2022	"Frenzy"	—	26	40	—	—	—	—	—	—	—		Every Loser
2022	"Strung Out Johnny"	—	—	—	—	—	—	—	—	—	—		Every Loser
"—" denotes the single failed to chart or was not released.

=== As featured artist ===
Year	Title	Chart positions		Album
Year	Title	AUS	UK	Album
1987	"Risky" (by Ryuichi Sakamoto)	—	—	Neo Geo
1992	"Daw Da Hiya" (by Ofra Haza)	—	—	Kirya
2000	"Aisha" (by Death in Vegas)	—	9	The Contino Sessions
2004	"Kick It" (by Peaches)	195	39	Fatherfucker
2006	"Punkrocker" (by Teddybears)	—	55	Soft Machine
2008	"The Wild One" (by Jet)	56	—	non-album single
2009	"He's Frank (Slight Return)" (by The BPA)	—	—	I Think We're Gonna Need a Bigger Boat
2020	"Broken Boy" (by Cage The Elephant)	—	—	non-album single
2020	"No Flag" (by Elvis Costello)	—	—	La Face de Pendule à Coucou
2021	"I Wanna Be Your Slave" (by Måneskin)	—	—	non-album single

== Contributions ==
=== As primary artist ===
Year	Song	Album	Album type	Notes
1984	"Repo Man"	Repo Man	soundtrack	original song
1989	"Love Transfusion"	Shocker: The Music	soundtrack	original song
1990	"Well, Did You Evah!"	Red Hot + Blue	charity album	with Debbie Harry
1991	"Why Was I Born? (Freddy's Dead)"	Freddy's Dead: The Final Nightmare	soundtrack	original song
1993	"Sookie, Sookie"	Back to the Streets: Celebrating the Music of Don Covay	tribute album	Don Covay cover
1994	"C'Mon Everybody"	Fast Track to Nowhere	soundtrack	Eddie Cochran cover
1997	"I'll Be Seeing You"	Jazz à Saint Germain	tribute album	with Françoise Hardy
2002	"Fix Me"	Rise Above	charity album	Black Flag cover
2009	"White Christmas"	An All-Star Salute to Christmas	various artists album	Irving Berlin cover
2012	"Lonely Boy"	Black on Blues: A Tribute to the Black Keys	various artists album	The Black Keys cover with Ginger Baker
2012	"I Can't Explain"	Who Are You: An All Star Tribute to The Who	tribute album	The Who cover
2013	"Asshole Rules the Navy" and "The Dreadnought"	Son of Rogues Gallery: Pirate Ballads, Sea Songs & Chanteys	various artists album	"Asshole Rules the Navy" with A Hark and a Hacksaw, "The Dreadnought" with Elegant Too, both traditional songs
2013	"Let's Boot and Rally"	True Blood: Volume 4	soundtrack	Gary Calamar & James Combs song, recorded with Bethany Cosentino
2013	"Sweet Betsy from Pike"	The Lone Ranger: Wanted	soundtrack inspired by the film	traditional song
2014	"Nobody's City"	Axels & Sockets: The Jeffrey Lee Pierce Sessions Project	tribute album	based on a demo by The Gun Club, with Nick Cave and featuring Thurston Moore
2016	"I Dig Your Mind"	Vinyl: Vol. 1.5	soundtrack EP	The Nervous Breakdowns cover
2017	"Gold"	Gold	soundtrack	original song
2022	"You Want It Darker"	Here It Is: A Tribute to Leonard Cohen	tribute album	Leonard Cohen cover

=== Guest appearances ===
==== Albums ====
Year	Title	Type	Artist	Notes
2014	Kinder Adams/Children of Adam	radio play	Kai Grehn	excerpts released in 2016 as "Leaves of Grass"

==== Songs ====
Year	Song	Album	Artist
1977	"What in the World"	Low	David Bowie
1984	"Dancing with the Big Boys"	Tonight	David Bowie
1987	"Risky"	Neo Geo	Ryuichi Sakamoto
1989	"New York City"	Sonic Temple	The Cult
1992	"Daw Da Hiya"	Kirya	Ofra Haza
1992	"Black Sunshine"	La Sexorcisto: Devil Music Volume One	White Zombie
1993	"In the Deathcar", "TV Screen", "Get the Money", and "This Is a Film"	Arizona Dream	Goran Bregović
1993	"My Love Is Bad"	Système D	Les Rita Mitsouko
1994	"Buckethead's Toy Store" and "Post Office Buddy"	Giant Robot	Buckethead
1997	"We Have All the Time in the World"	Shaken and Stirred: The David Arnold James Bond Project	David Arnold
1999	"The Western Lands" and "A Quick Trip to Alamut"	The End of Law	Bill Laswell as Hashisheen
1999	"Aisha"	The Contino Sessions	Death in Vegas
2000	"Enfilade" and "Rolodex Propaganda"	Relationship of Command	At the Drive-In
2003	"Rockicide"	Narcotic Wide Screen Vista	Millenia Nova
2003	"Kick It"	Fatherfucker	Peaches
2006	"Punkrocker"	Soft Machine	Teddybears
2008	"Furies"	Profanation (Preparation for a Coming Darkness)	Praxis
2008	"No Fun"	Punkara	Asian Dub Foundation
2008	"Oh My God"	Fortress Round My Heart	Ida Maria
2009	"He's Frank (Slight Return)"	I Think We're Gonna Need a Bigger Boat	The Brighton Port Authority
2009	"I Hate People"	Break It Up	Jemima Pearl
2010	"We're All Gonna Die"	Slash	Slash
2010	"Pain"	Dark Night of the Soul	Danger Mouse and Sparklehorse
2011	"The Little Drummer Boy"	Noël! Noël!! Noël!!!	Michel Legrand
2011	"Initials B.B."	From Gainsbourg to Lulu	Lulu Gainsbourg
2012	"It Don't Mean a Thing (If I Ain't Got That Swing)"	The Duke	Joe Jackson
2012	"Nothin' But Time"	Sun	Cat Power
2012	"Dirty Love"	Warrior	Kesha
2015	"La Uva"	A Raw Youth	Le Butcherettes
2015	"Stray Dog"	Music Complete	New Order
2015	"How the Cookie Crumbles" and "Walking Through the Night"	Strangers	Tomoyasu Hotei
2015	"Christmas Wrapping"	Kylie Christmas	Kylie Minogue
2017	"Aggrophobe"	Bad Thing	PINS
2017	"Don't Lose Yourself", "Loneliness Road", and "Everyday"	Loneliness Road	Jamie Saft, Steve Swallow, and Bobby Previte
2017	"Sahara"	Résistance	Songhoy Blues
2017	"The Pure and the Damned"	Good Time	Oneohtrix Point Never
2018	"Silent Night"	Shatner Claus	William Shatner
2019	"Mobile"	Elevator Music, Vol. 1	Pan Amsterdam
2019	"Resist"	Perlas & Conchas	Fémina
2019	"Le Diplomate" and "Bitch"	ACCA	ALA.NI
2020	"The Acid Lands"	The Acid Lands	Opening Performance Orchestra
2021	"Why Can't We Live Together", "Sunshine Superman"	Breathe	Dr. Lonnie Smith
2021	"L'appartement (en duo avec Iggy Pop)"	L'amour hélas	Clio
2022	"The Dictator"	N/A	Catherine Graindorge
2024	"Awful Dream"	Orgy of the Damned	Slash
2025	"The Whole Woman feat. Iggy Pop"	Iconoclasts	Anna von Hausswolff
TBA	TBA	Bonfire of Teenagers	Morrissey

== Other releases ==
=== Albums ===
- Live in the Cover (Skydog, France, 1993) – same release as We Are Not Talking About Commercial Shit! (Skydog, France, 1995).
- Nuggets (UK, Jungle Records, 1999)
- I Wanna Be Your Dog EP (Skydog, France, 2006) – six versions of "I Wanna Be Your Dog".
- Gimme Some Skin (US, Cleopatra Records, 2014) – CD / 7x7" 45 RPM box set.

=== Songs ===
- "Rebel Rebel" (2010) – promo single credited to Darkos, Pop's character in Arthur 3: The War of the Two Worlds.
- "White Christmas (Guitar Stooge Version)" (2013) – alternate take of "White Christmas" for album Psych-Out Christmas.
