= Pop Song =

Pop Song or Pop Songs may refer to:

== Music ==
- Pop song, the main form of pop music
- "Pop Song" (David Sylvian song), 1989
- "Pop Song", a song by The Drugs, 2000
- "Pop Song", song by STRFKR from the 2008 album Starfucker
- "Pop Song", a song by Clouddead from the 2004 album Ten
- Pop Songs, a 1991 compilation album by Iggy Pop
- Pop Songs, a music chart published weekly by Billboard magazine, now known as Pop Airplay

== See also ==
- Pop (disambiguation), including a list of songs with the title "Pop"
- "Pop Song 89", song by R.E.M.
- Pop, Songs & Death, a series of EPs released by Wheatus
- SongPop, 2012 music trivia game by FreshPlanet
