= Pop music (disambiguation) =

Pop music is a musical genre.

Pop music may also refer to:

- Popular music, a number of musical genres having wide appeal
- Pop Music, a 1996 album by Iggy Pop
- "Pop Music", a 2017 song by Poppy from Poppy.Computer

== See also ==
- "Pop Muzik", a 1979 song by M
- Pop Music/False B-Sides, a 2011 album by Baths
- Pop'n Music, a music video game series by Konami
- This Is Pop Music, a 2000 album by Espen Lind
- Record chart, a ranking of recorded music according to popularity
