= Blood orange (disambiguation) =

Blood orange is a variety of orange with crimson, blood-colored flesh.

Blood orange may also refer to:

== Film ==
- Blood Orange (1953 film), starring Tom Conway, U.S. title Three Stops to Murder
- Blood Orange (2016 film), starring Iggy Pop and Kacey Barnfield
- The Blood Oranges (film), a 1997 erotic drama film

== Music ==
- Blood Orange (album), 2023 album by English singer Freya Ridings
- Blood Orange (musician), artist name of English musician Dev Hynes
- Blood Oranges (band), U.S. alternative country band

== Other uses ==
- Blood Orange (novel), 2019 novel by Harriet Tyce
- The Blood Oranges (novel), 1971 novel by John Hawkes
- Blood orange, a RAL color
