= Noel! Noel!! Noel!!! =

Noël! Noël!! Noël!!!

Studio album by Michel Legrand
- Released: 2011
- Genres: Jazz, Pop, Christmas

Noel! Noel!! Noel!!! is a holiday album by Michel Legrand featuring various artists, released in December 2011 through Verve Records.

== Track listing ==
1. Jamie Cullum – "Let It Snow"
2. Teddy Thompson/Rufus Wainwright – "White Christmas"
3. Madeleine Peyroux – "Have Yourself a Merry Little Christmas"
4. Madeleine Peyroux, Emilie Simon, Carla Bruni, Rufus Wainwright, Iggy Pop – "Noel d'Espoir"
5. MIKA – "Vive le Vent" (Jingle Bells)
6. Emilie Simon – "Santa Baby"
7. Carla Bruni – "Jolis Sapins"
8. Iggy Pop – "The Little Drummer Boy"
9. Ayo – "Santa Claus Is Coming to Town"
10. Imelda May – "Silent Night"

== Alternative track listing (French version) ==
1. Jamie Cullum – "Let It Snow"
2. Rufus Wainwright, Madeleine Peyroux, Emilie Simon, Carla Bruni, Iggy Pop – "Noel d'Espoir"
3. Madeleine Peyroux – "Have Yourself a Merry Little Christmas"
4. MIKA – "Vive le Vent" (Jingle Bells)
5. Emilie Simon – "Santa Baby"
6. Renan Luce - "Le pere Noel et la petite fille"
7. Coeur de Pirate - "Noel Blanc" (White Christmas)
8. Carla Bruni – "Jolis Sapins"
9. Iggy Pop – "The Little Drummer Boy"
10. Ayo – "Santa Claus Is Coming to Town"
11. Olivia Ruiz - "Le Noel de la rue"
12. -M- - "Douce Nuit" (Silent Night)

== See also ==
- Michel Legrand
- Michel Legrand discography
- Christmas music
- Christmas albums
- Verve Records
