= Kacey Clarke =

English actress (born 1988)

- Born: Kacey Louisa Barnfield; 14 January 1988 (age 38); Enfield, London, UK
- Occupation: Actress
- Years active: 1997–present

Kacey Louisa Barnfield (born 14 January 1988), also credited as Kacey Clarke, is an English actress. As a teenager she played Maddie Gilks in the long-running British television series Grange Hill, on which she was in six series. As an adult, her roles have included Crystal in the American action film Resident Evil: Afterlife, and Katie Sutherland in British comedy The Inbetweeners. In 2014, Clarke was listed as number 99 in FHM's 100 sexiest women in the world.

== Personal life ==
Clarke was born in the London Borough of Enfield as Kacey Louisa Barnfield to parents Malcolm, a partner at the Enfield estate agency Barnfield's, and Karen. She has a brother and a sister. Clarke is a second cousin of the actress Victoria Shalet.

== Career ==
Barnfield began acting in 1997 at age nine. In 2000, Barnfield won the role of bully Maddie Gilks in Grange Hill, in which she found herself in central plots during her four years on the series.

After Grange Hill, Clarke filmed Popcorn with Jodi Albert and Jack Ryder, and plays the character of Yukino. She has also appeared in the Sky1 football drama Dream Team. Other roles include Zoe Stringer in Filthy Rich, in which she plays the daughter of Mike Reid's character shortly before the actor died; The Bill, in which she played Chloe Fox for three episodes in 2004 and Kelly Burgess in October 2007; and Casualty, in which she appeared as Claudie Waters for two episodes on 29 and 30 December 2007. In 2008, Clarke was the face of Clean & Clear, appearing in adverts for the skincare brand. She also starred in the road safety advert "Mess". In 2008 she became Galaxy chocolate's "Miss Kiss" to advertise the company's Christmas Mistletoe Kisses chocolates. She appeared in the E4 sitcom The Inbetweeners as Neil's sister, Katie, in the second-series episode "A Night Out in London" (2009) and the third-series episode "Will's Dilemma" (2010).

Clarke made her theatrical film debut as Crystal Waters in the Screen Gem's 3D action film Resident Evil: Afterlife alongside Milla Jovovich, Wentworth Miller and Ali Larter. It topped the box office in September 2010. Clarke also starred in the TV movie Lake Placid 3, in which she plays Ellie; this was also in 2010. In 2011, she played the lead role of Kate in Johannes Roberts' Roadkill, a horror film about a group of teens taking an ill-fated RV trip around Ireland. Her performance was well received. Clarke appeared as Barb in Jeremy Leven's 2013 movie Girl on a Bicycle.

In June 2011, Variety magazine reported that Clarke would co-star in Glutton, a "3D psychological thriller" directed by David Arquette, playing Virginia, the blind neighbour and only friend of a 1,200-pound man, played by (Abraham Benrubi). Patricia Arquette also stars in it. Glutton was to begin filming in Canada in summer 2011, though no film under that title has been released.

== Filmography ==
Film roles
Year	Title	Role	Notes
2007	Popcorn	Yukino Girl	
2010	Resident Evil: Afterlife	Crystal Waters	
2011	Film: The Making of...	Maresi De La Mer-Taylor	Short film
2013	Girl on a Bicycle	Barb	
2013	I Spit on Your Grave 2	Sharon	
2013	Green Street 3: Never Back Down	Molly	Direct to-DVD
2014	Film: The Movie	Maresi De La Mer	
2015	Seeking Dolly Parton	Charlie	
2015	World War Dead: Rise of the Fallen	Amanda	
2016	Blood Orange	Isabelle	Completed
2016	Neron	Alison Dunn	
2018	Welcome to Curiosity	Martine	
2019	Bayou Tales	Neilson	
TBA	Enchanting the Mortals	Ashley	Post-Production

Television roles
Year	Title	Role	Notes
2001–2005	Grange Hill	Maddie Gilks	Main role (seasons 24–29)
2003	Dreamteam	Leanne	TV miniseries
2004	The Bill	Chloe Fox	3 episodes
2007	Casualty	Claudie Waters	Episodes: "Take a Cup of Kindness Yet", "For Auld Lang Syne"
2007	The Bill	Kelly Burgess	Episode: "Uncut Killer"
2009–2010	The Inbetweeners	Katie Sutherland	Episodes: "Night Out in London", "Will's Dilemma"
2010	Lake Placid 3	Ellie	Television movie
2011	Roadkill	Kate	Television movie
2011	Jabberwock	Anabel	Television movie
2013	Massholes	Vicky	Web series; episode: "The Gentleman's Conga"
2016	10 Year Reunion	Carly Newman	Television movie
