= Roadkill Rising =

Roadkill Rising: The Bootleg Collection 1977–2009

Box set by Iggy Pop
- Released: May 17, 2011
- Genres: Rock, punk rock, protopunk
- Label: Shout! Factory

Iggy Pop chronology
| Préliminaires (2009) | Roadkill Rising: The Bootleg Collection 1977–2009 (2011) | Après (2012) |

Bonus Disc Art
- Live At The Old Waldorf: San Francisco – November 27, 1979 album art

Professional ratings
Review scores
| Source | Rating |
|---|---|
| AllMusic | 3/5 stars |

Roadkill Rising is a compilation box set of Iggy Pop's music, released by Shout! Factory on May 17, 2011. The set contains a 4-CD set of newly remastered bootleg tracks from live Iggy Pop shows. Sequenced by decade, the set focuses on key songs by the Stooges and tracks culled from Pop's extensive solo catalog, including his hits and an array of covers. This collection is part of a series of "official" bootleg releases by Shout! Factory and producer David Skye, with the blessing and participation of artists to provide fans with only the best performances, highest quality recordings, superior packaging and with original cover artwork designed by illustrator William Stout, one of the first rock and roll bootleg cover artists. Previous releases in the series include Emerson Lake & Palmer's A Time and a Place and Todd Rundgren's For Lack of Honest Work.

== Track listing ==
Disc 1 (The 70s)
| No. | Title | Writer(s) | Length |
|---|---|---|---|
| 1. | "Iggy Pop Intro" (San Diego State University, San Diego, CA (11/16/77)) | Iggy Pop |
| 2. | "Raw Power" (Rainbow Theatre, London, UK (3/7/77)) | Pop, James Williamson |
| 3. | "1969" (Rainbow Theatre, London, UK (3/7/77)) | Pop, Dave Alexander, Ron Asheton, Scott Asheton |
| 4. | "Funtime" (Rainbow Theatre, London, UK (3/7/77)) | Pop, David Bowie |
| 5. | "I Need Somebody" (Agora Ballroom, Cleveland, OH (3/22/77)) | Pop, Williamson |
| 6. | "Search and Destroy" (Agora Ballroom, Cleveland, OH (3/22/77)) | Pop/Williamson |
| 7. | "Turn Blue" (Masonic Temple, Detroit, MI (3/25/77)) | Pop |
| 8. | "Gimme Danger" (Masonic Temple, Detroit, MI (3/25/77)) | Pop, Williamson |
| 9. | "Tonight" (Masonic Temple, Detroit, MI (3/25/77)) | Pop, Bowie |
| 10. | "Fall In Love With Me" (San Diego State University, San Diego, CA (11/16/77)) | Pop, Bowie, Hunt Sales, Tony Sales |
| 11. | "Gloria" (San Diego State University, San Diego, CA (11/16/77)) | Van Morrison |
| 12. | "Rock Action" (San Diego State University, San Diego, CA (11/16/77)) | Pop |
| 13. | "Knocking 'Em Down In The City" (Old Waldorf, San Francisco, CA (11/27/79)) | Pop |
| 14. | "New Values" (Old Waldorf, San Francisco, CA (11/27/79)) | Pop, Scott Thurston |
| 15. | "Play It Safe" (Old Waldorf, San Francisco, CA (11/27/79)) | Pop, Bowie |
| 16. | "Your Pretty Face is Going to Hell" (Old Waldorf, San Francisco, CA (11/27/79)) | Pop, Williamson |
| 17. | "You Really Got Me" (Old Waldorf, San Francisco, CA (11/27/79)) | Ray Davies |

Disc 2 (The 80s)
| No. | Title | Writer(s) | Length |
|---|---|---|---|
| 1. | "Nightclubbing" (Bookie's, Detroit, MI (9/26/80)) | Pop, Bowie |
| 2. | "Puppet World" (Bookie's, Detroit, MI (9/26/80)) | Pop, Ivan Kral |
| 3. | "One For My Baby (And One More For The Road)" (Bookie's, Detroit, MI (9/26/80)) | Harold Arlen, Johnny Mercer |
| 4. | "Take Care of Me" (Bookie's, Detroit, MI (9/26/80)) | Pop, Glen Matlock |
| 5. | "Batman Theme" (Music Hall, Toronto, Ontario, Canada (12/3/81)) | Neal Hefti |
| 6. | "Hang On Sloopy" (Music Hall, Toronto, Ontario, Canada (12/3/81)) | Wes Farrell, Bert Russell |
| 7. | "I Wanna Be Your Dog" (Club 1018, New York, NY (4/5/87)) | Pop, Alexander, Ron Asheton, Scott Asheton |
| 8. | "Loose" (Club 1018, New York, NY (4/5/87)) | Pop, Alexander, Ron Asheton, Scott Asheton |
| 9. | "Real Wild Child" (Club 1018, New York, NY (4/5/87)) | Johnny O'Keefe, Greenan, Owens |
| 10. | "Sister Midnight" (Club 1018, New York, NY (4/5/87)) | Pop, Carlos Alomar, Bowie |
| 11. | "Blah Blah Blah" (Bay Street, Sag Harbor, NY (4/15/87)) | Pop, Bowie |
| 12. | "Winners and Losers" (Bay Street, Sag Harbor, NY (4/15/87)) | Pop, Steve Jones |
| 13. | "Shades" (Bay Street, Sag Harbor, NY (4/15/87)) | Pop, Bowie |
| 14. | "Some Weird Sin" (Bay Street, Sag Harbor, NY (4/15/87)) | Pop, Bowie |
| 15. | "Kill City" (The Channel, Boston, MA (7/19/88)) | Pop, Williamson |
| 16. | "High On You" (The Ritz, New York, NY (7/20/88)) | Pop |

Disc 3 (The 90s)
| No. | Title | Writer(s) | Length |
|---|---|---|---|
| 1. | "Lust for Life" (Neue Welt, Berlin, Germany (1/26/91)) | Pop, Bowie |
| 2. | "China Girl" (Neue Welt, Berlin, Germany (1/26/91)) | Pop, Bowie |
| 3. | "Butt Town" (Neue Welt, Berlin, Germany (1/26/91)) | Pop |
| 4. | "Home" (Neue Welt, Berlin, Germany (1/26/91)) | Pop |
| 5. | "TV Eye" (Phoenix Festival, Long Marston Airfield, Stratford-Upon-Avon, UK (7/17/94)) | Pop, Alexander, Ron Asheton, Scott Asheton |
| 6. | "The Passenger" (Phoenix Festival, Long Marston Airfield, Stratford-Upon-Avon, UK (7/17/94)) | Pop, Ricky Gardiner |
| 7. | "Louie Louie" (Phoenix Festival, Long Marston Airfield, Stratford-Upon-Avon, UK (7/17/94)) | Richard Berry |
| 8. | "Rip It Up" (Phoenix Festival, Long Marston Airfield, Stratford-Upon-Avon, UK (7/17/94)) | Robert Blackwell, John Marascalco |
| 9. | "Candy" (Leysin Festival, Leysin, Switzerland (6/12/91)) | Pop |
| 10. | "Five Foot One" (Leysin Festival, Leysin, Switzerland (6/12/91)) | Pop |
| 11. | "Caesar" (Agora Theatre, Evry, France (4/23/94)) | Pop, Eric Schermerhorn |
| 12. | "In The Death Car" (Agora Theatre, Evry, France (4/23/94)) | Pop, Goran Bregović |
| 13. | "Fucking Alone" (Agora Theatre, Evry, France (4/23/94)) | Pop, Schermerhorn |
| 14. | "Hate" (Agora Theatre, Evry, France (4/23/94)) | Pop |
| 15. | "No Fun" (Agora Theatre, Evry, France (4/23/94)) | Pop, Alexander, Ron Asheton, Scott Asheton |

Disc 4 (The 00s)
| No. | Title | Writer(s) | Length |
|---|---|---|---|
| 1. | "Corruption" (Bizarre Festival, Weeze, Germany (8/20/01)) | Pop, Cragin, Kirst |
| 2. | "Howl" (Bizarre Festival, Weeze, Germany (8/20/01)) | Pop, Kirst |
| 3. | "The Jerk" (Bizarre Festival, Weeze, Germany (8/20/01)) | Pop, Kirst |
| 4. | "Lost" (Bizarre Festival, Weeze, Germany (8/20/01)) | Pop, Kirst |
| 5. | "Drink New Blood" (Bizarre Festival, Weeze, Germany (8/20/01)) | Pop, Kirst |
| 6. | "Dirt" (Bol D'Or Circuit De Nevers Magny-Cours, Magny-Cours, France (9/13/03)) | Pop, Alexander, Ron Asheton, Scott Asheton |
| 7. | "Dirt #2" (Bol D'Or Circuit De Nevers Magny-Cours, Magny-Cours, France (9/13/03)) | Pop, Alexander, Ron Asheton, Scott Asheton |
| 8. | "Down On The Street" (Glastonbury Festival, England, Pilton, Somerset, UK (6/23/07)) | Pop, Alexander, Ron Asheton, Scott Asheton |
| 9. | "Real Cool Time" (Glastonbury Festival, England, Pilton, Somerset, UK (6/23/07)) | Pop, Alexander, Ron Asheton, Scott Asheton |
| 10. | "Funhouse" (The FIB, Benicassim, Spain (7/19/07)) | Pop, Alexander, Ron Asheton, Scott Asheton |
| 11. | "My Idea of Fun" (The 930 Club, Washington, DC (4/5/07)) | Pop, Ron Asheton, Scott Asheton |
| 12. | "Not Right" (The 930 Club, Washington, DC (4/5/07)) | Pop, Alexander, Ron Asheton, Scott Asheton |
| 13. | "Skull Ring" (The 930 Club, Washington, DC (4/5/07)) | Pop, Ron Asheton, Scott Asheton |
| 14. | "Les Feuilles Mortes (Autumn Leaves)" (Studio 105, Maison de la Radio, Paris, France (5/28/09)) | Joseph Kosma, Jacques Prévert |
| 15. | "King of the Dogs" (Studio 105, Maison de la Radio, Paris, France (5/28/09)) | Lillian Hardin Armstrong, Pop |
| 16. | "Spanish Coast" (Studio 105, Maison de la Radio, Paris, France (5/28/09)) | Pop, Cragin |
| 17. | "Willow Weep For Me" (Studio 105, Maison de la Radio, Paris, France (5/28/09)) | Ann Ronell |
| 18. | "Shotgun" (Studio 105, Maison de la Radio, Paris, France (5/28/09)) | DeWalt |

Bonus Disc: Live At The Old Waldorf: San Francisco – November 27, 1979
| No. | Title | Length |
|---|---|---|
| 1. | "Real Cool Time" |
| 2. | "Knocking Em Down In The City" |
| 3. | "Take Care of Me" |
| 4. | "Dog Food" |
| 5. | "You Really Got Me" |
| 6. | "New Values" |
| 7. | "TV Eyes" |
| 8. | "Play It Safe" |
| 9. | "Your Pretty Face is Going to Hell" |
| 10. | "Funtime" |
| 11. | "Funtime Part 2" |
| 12. | "I Wanna Be Your Dog" |
| 13. | "One For My Baby (And One More For The Road)" |
| 14. | "No Fun" |

== Credits ==
- Produced By: David Skye
- Remastered By: Randy Wine at MoonWine Studios
- Business Affairs: Dave McIntosh
- Cover Illustration: William Stout
- Art Direction and Package Design: Andrew Robinson
- Editorial Supervision: Dorothy Stefanski
- Project Assistance: Emily Sage and Jeff Palo

== Notes ==
The album booklet credits "One for My Baby (and One More for the Road)" to Anderson/Barge/Guida/Royster. Additionally, "Real Wild Child" is erroneously credited to "Keefe" (for Johnny O'Keefe) and "Green" (for Johnny Greenan).
