= Roadkill (2011 film) =

- DVD cover
- Genre: Fantasy; Horror; Science fiction
- Written by: Rick Suvalle
- Directed by: Johannes Roberts
- Starring: Kacey Barnfield; Oliver James; Diarmuid Noyes; Eliza Bennett; Colin Maher; Kobna Holdbrook-Smith; Ned Dennehy; Róisín Murphy; Eve Macklin; Stephen Rea
- Theme music composer: Ray Harman
- Country of origin: United States
- Original language: English

Production
- Producer: Adrian Sturges
- Cinematography: Peter Robertson
- Editor: Tony Kearns
- Running time: 88 minutes
- Production companies: MNG Films; Parallel Film Productions; RHI Entertainment; Syfy
- Budget: $2 million

Original release
- Network: Syfy
- Release: April 23, 2011

Roadkill is a 2011 American television horror film directed by Johannes Roberts and written by Rick Suvalle. It stars Kacey Barnfield, Oliver James, Diarmuid Noyes and Stephen Rea. It is the twenty-fifth film in the Maneater film series.

Roadkill premiered on Syfy on April 23, 2011, and was released on DVD on August 30, 2011.

== Plot ==
Kate travels around Ireland in an R.V. with her ex-boyfriend Ryan, brother Joel, and friends Hailey, Chuck, Tommy and Anita. After driving into the countryside, the group stops at a small shop. They encounter Luca, who attempts to scam them into buying a medallion, and warns them it is dangerous before Chuck steals the medallion and the group attempts to make a quick getaway. However, as they drive away in their R.V., they hit an old woman, cursing the group and telling them the mythical bird, the roc, will take vengeance on them, before dying. The group quickly drives away in their R.V. but hits a patch of thick fog and becomes lost as the curse's fears heighten. Stopping the R.V., they encounter a young boy in the road. Anita leaves the R.V. to talk to the boy, but he runs away before the roc grabs Anita and drags her into the air. Her body is dropped in front of the R.V., with half of her face mauled off before the roc returns and flies away with her.

Ryan continues to drive down the road, and the group begin to panic, as they cannot contact help. The roc attacks the R.V. and causes a tire to blow. Armed with a road flare, Tommy goes to change the tires. As he finishes, the roc returns. The group hears the road flare set off and rushes outside to find Tommy with his face mauled off. The roc swoops down, grabs Tommy, flies off and decapitates Tommy, while the others retreat into the R.V. The group begin to argue, but the roc reappears, chasing after the R.V. However, it flies away when the R.V. reaches a secluded house. The group enters the house and finds a family, including Drina, willing to let them use their phone. However, Luca arrives and takes them outside at gunpoint. Drina takes Kate to retrieve the medallion from the R.V.; however, Kate knocks her out and escapes, having already put the medallion on, while Luca ties the others to wooden poles so the roc can get them. As the roc arrives, Kate manages to free her friends before the roc flies away after seeing the medallion. However, Luca shoots Hailey in the stomach, killing her and forcing the others to flee into the surrounding forest.

Luca chases them throughout the forest, but they manage to escape back to the R.V., and they find Drina again, who begs for the medallion. Kate discovers the medallion is protection against the roc, so she escapes with it, leaving Drina to be killed by the roc. After driving down the road farther, the group passed a service station. Ryan leaves the R.V. after reconciling with Kate to call for help, while the others continue to drive down the road to create a distraction. The roc briefly follows the R.V. but soon circles around to go back for Ryan. As Ryan is about to be attacked, the others distract the roc and manage to harm it with fire. They leave the R.V. to find Ryan missing and the phone broken. They hide in a restroom before they hear a policeman, Seamus, arrive. However, he begins to tie them up for the roc, but they overpower him and knock him unconscious. While escaping, Joel is carried away by the roc. As Kate and Chuck leave, they run over Seamus, killing him.

After driving down the road, Kate receives a call from Ryan. However, the line is cut dead. Kate manages to get a signal and phones Ryan back. Hearing the cell phone ring, Kate rushes into the forest only to find Luca, who shows Kate the roc's nest, filled with her dead friends. Chuck arrives and sends Luca away at gunpoint before Kate takes the gun and sends Chuck back to the R.V. to escape, while she remains mourning in the nest with the bodies of her friends, including Ryan, to be killed by the roc, by tearing her face off.

Chuck, the group's sole survivor, reaches a gas station and stops for gas, but Luca is already there and forces Chuck to give him the medallion. The roc arrives, but Chuck manages to ignite some spilled gas, blowing up the R.V. and Luca with the roc. The roc, however, somehow manages to survive and attacks Chuck as he walks away, completing the old woman's revenge.

== Cast ==
- Kacey Barnfield as Kate
- Oliver James as Ryan
- Diarmuid Noyes as Chuck
- Eliza Bennett as Hailey
- Colin Maher as Joel
- Kobna Holdbrook-Smith as Tommy
- Ned Dennehy as Luca
- Róisín Murphy as Anita
- Eve Macklin as Drina
- Stephen Rea as Officer Seamus

== Release ==
=== Home media ===
Roadkill was released on DVD by RHI Entertainment on August 30, 2011. It was later released by Gaiam International on September 18, 2012, as a part of its three-disk Maneater Series movie pack. Sonar Entertainment last released it on March 10, 2015, as part of its two-disk "Fright Night Collection."

== Reception ==
Dread Central gave the film a score of 3.5 out of 5, writing, "All in all Roadkill is a solid entry in the Syfy Original genre. While it suffers from some of the shortcomings we’re used to seeing with these films, there are enough pleasant surprises to keep it interesting. The filmmaking is strong overall, and it’s clear everyone involved was actually trying to make a good movie here. You never get the sense anyone involved simply showed up for a paycheck, and their dedication shows." Bruce Kooken from HorrorNews.net gave the film a positive review, writing, "The distinction that Roadkill makes is that the acting is surprisingly good, the story concept is rather nifty even though the gypsy-curse angle has been recycled .. and there’s actually some credible character development." Justin Felix from DVD Talk gave the film a negative review, writing, "Roadkill takes full advantage of its Irish countryside location, but little else works in this SyFy Channel Maneater Series entry that unsuccessfully tries to merge the creature feature template with the backwoods killer genre."
