= Post Pop Depression Tour =

2016 concert tour by Iggy Pop

- Tour by Iggy Pop
- Location: Europe, North America
- Associated album: Post Pop Depression
- Start date: 28 March 2016
- End date: 15 May 2016
- No. of shows: 21 total: 7 in Europe; 14 in North America

The Post Pop Depression Tour was a concert tour by American rock artist Iggy Pop, launched in support of his namesake 17th studio album, Post Pop Depression. The tour comprised two legs, with a total of 20 shows across Europe and North America, where he performed with the band used on the record. Following a warm-up performance at the Teragram Ballroom in Los Angeles on March 9, 2016, the first official show of the tour was held at the Paramount Theatre in Seattle on March 28.

Jon Parales of The New York Times described the Austin, Texas performance as "He sang with full-throated conviction, utterly hard-nosed within the songs but grinning and thankful between them. He struck poses with every muscle clenched, he jittered across the stage, he repeatedly kicked around his microphone stand and a stool he barely used."

The London performance was streamed on its four-year anniversary.

== Tour dates ==
Date	City	Country	Venue
Leg 1: North America
28 March 2016	Seattle	United States	Paramount Theatre
29 March 2016	Portland	United States	Keller Auditorium
31 March 2016	San Francisco	United States	Nob Hill Masonic Auditorium
2 April 2016	Denver	United States	Ellie Caulkins Opera House
4 April 2016	Minneapolis	United States	Northrop Auditorium
6 April 2016	Chicago	United States	Chicago Theatre
7 April 2016	Detroit	United States	Fox Theatre
9 April 2016	Toronto	Canada	Sony Centre for the Performing Arts
11 April 2016	Boston	United States	Orpheum Theatre
12 April 2016	New York City	United States	United Palace
14 April 2016	Port Chester	United States	Capitol Theatre
15 April 2016	Philadelphia	United States	Academy of Music
19 April 2016	Miami Beach	United States	Fillmore Miami Beach at the Jackie Gleason Theater
28 April 2016	Los Angeles	United States	Greek Theatre
Leg 2: Europe
4 May 2016	Stockholm	Sweden	Cirkus
5 May 2016	Frederiksberg	Denmark	Falkoner Center
7 May 2016	Berlin	Germany	Tempodrom
8 May 2016	Hamburg	Germany	Mehr! Theater
10 May 2016	Amsterdam	Netherlands	Heineken Music Hall
13 May 2016	London	United Kingdom	Royal Albert Hall
15 May 2016	Paris	France	Le Grand Rex
