= Diarmuid Noyes =

Irish actor

- Born: Diarmuid Noyes; 14 January 1988 (age 38); Dublin, Ireland
- Occupation: Actor
- Years active: 2002–present

Diarmuid Noyes (born 14 January 1988) is an Irish theatre, TV, commercial, and film actor, known for his role in the 2011 American science fiction horror telefilm, Roadkill. At fourteen, he starred in the 2002 award-winning Irish short film, Broken Things. He plays Alessandro Farnese (the eventual Paul III) in the Tom Fontana television series, Borgia.

== Filmography ==
=== Television ===
- Blood (2018–2020) – Michael Hogan
- Borgia (2011) – Alessandro Farnese
- Single-Handed (2010) – Ruairi
- Pure Mule: The Last Weekend (2009) – Dean
- The Tudors (2009) – Charlie Raw
- Prosperity (2007) – Dean
- Fair City – Teenager

=== Movies ===
- Christy (2025)
- Lost & Found (2018)
- Two Black Coffees (2017)
- Honeymoon for One (2011) – Mark
- Downriver (2011) – Eric
- Roadkill (2011) – Chuck
- Killing Bono (2011) – Plugger
- Parked (2010) – Cathal's brother
- Savage (2009) – Attacker 2
- Five Minutes of Heaven (2009) – Andy
- Situations Vacant (2008) – Dave
- Broken Things (2002) – Joey
