= Blood Orange (2016 film) =

Film starring Iggy Pop

- Directed by: Toby Tobias
- Starring: Iggy Pop; Kacey Barnfield; Ben Lamb
- Production companies: Lightworks Film; Trigger Films
- Release date: 29 April 2016 (United Kingdom)
- Country: United Kingdom
- Language: English

Blood Orange is a 2016 film noir directed by Toby Tobias and starring Iggy Pop as an ageing rock star (Bill) and Kacey Barnfield as his young wife (Isabelle). It is the first film in which Iggy Pop played a lead role, although he had previously had cameo roles in several films.

== Plot ==
In a stunning modern Spanish Villa lives Bill, an ageing, half-blind rock star, with his young, very beautiful and sexually promiscuous wife Isabelle. Into their Ibizan paradise comes Lucas, an ex-lover looking for revenge. Lucas wants his inheritance back; he believes she stole it from him, but Isabelle will give him nothing. Bill asks Lucas to stay and to make peace with Isabelle. However, Lucas is already torn up inside with the desire for revenge, and when he sees how Isabelle is having one of her flings with David, their Spanish pool boy, he sees an opportunity to turn the tables and things spiral dangerously out of control.

== Cast ==
- Iggy Pop as Bill
- Kacey Barnfield as Isabelle
- Ben Lamb as Lucas
- Antonio Magro as David

== Critical reception ==
In the UK, the Radio Times commented that "the twist isn't entirely concealed, but it is surprisingly atmospheric and artful." The Guardian gave the film three stars out of five. Critic Stuart Bannerman described the film as “one of the highlights of my film viewing year”, and as “very well directed and filmed in beautiful locations”. Stephen Dalton of The Hollywood Reporter said that Iggy Pop “oozes craggy charisma in his first starring role” and that his "casting should give it cult appeal in theaters", but described the film as "more self-conscious homage to vintage film noir than a fully rounded addition to the genre", and criticised director Tobias for requiring Barnfield to appear nude in several scenes, commenting that "for male-written female-fantasy figures, the line between empowerment and exploitation is often a fuzzy one".

== Home media ==
Blood Orange (2016 film) was released on DVD in Region 1 (USA), Region 2 (Europe) and Region 4 (Australia).
