= Post Pop Depression =

Studio album by Iggy Pop
- Released: March 18, 2016
- Recorded: January 12 – March 9, 2015
- Studios: Rancho De La Luna (Joshua Tree, California); Pink Duck (Burbank, California)
- Genres: Art rock; garage rock; hard rock
- Length: 41:31
- Labels: Caroline International; Loma Vista
- Producer: Josh Homme

Iggy Pop chronology
Après (2012)	Post Pop Depression (2016)	Teatime Dub Encounters (2018)

Singles from Post Pop Depression
- 1. "Gardenia" Released: January 22, 2016; 2. "Break into Your Heart" Released: 2016; 3. "Sunday" Released: 2016

Post Pop Depression is the seventeenth studio album by American rock singer Iggy Pop, released by Caroline International / Loma Vista Recordings on March 18, 2016. Produced by Josh Homme of Queens of the Stone Age, the album was recorded in secrecy and features contributions from Queens of the Stone Age keyboardist and guitarist Dean Fertita, and Arctic Monkeys drummer Matt Helders.

The album gained a new level of chart success for Pop at age 68, becoming his first US top 20 album and first UK top 5 album. His previous highest peaks were both in 1977, when The Idiot reached No. 72 in the US and Lust for Life reached No. 28 in the UK.

In 2026, the track "Sunday" made was covered by Queens of the Stone Age for the album "Perfecth".

== Background and recording ==
Pop and Homme began working on the album in January 2015. Pop contacted Homme by text message to ask if he was interested in writing music together. After they spoke by phone, Pop sent Homme some lyrics by mail, along with notes about Pop's time working with David Bowie. Three months later, Homme sent lyrics to Pop, and they agreed to work together on recording songs in a studio. They brought incomplete ideas as opposed to finished songs so that they could work on them together. Pop described the album as "discussing issues of what happens when your utility is at an end, and dealing with your legacy".

Consisting of nine songs, the album was recorded between January 12 and March 9, 2015, at Rancho De La Luna in Joshua Tree, California, over the course of two weeks, and another week at Pink Duck Studios in Burbank, California. Pop and Homme self-financed the album. Dean Fertita recorded guitar and keyboards, while Matt Helders recorded drum tracks. Homme has stated that preparing Post Pop Depression was one thing that helped him cope with the aftermath of the November 2015 terrorist attacks involving his other band, Eagles of Death Metal.

== Release and promotion ==
The album was released on March 18, 2016. At the time, Pop and Homme had already embarked on a US tour to support the album, which began in Los Angeles on March 9, 2016, and was due to be followed in May 2016 by a European tour. Another show was added in Paris on August 26, 2016, during the Rock en Seine festival. In addition to Pop and Homme, the tour included Fertita, Helders, Matt Sweeney playing bass guitar, and Troy Van Leeuwen playing guitar.

The lead single from the album, "Gardenia", was debuted on The Late Show with Stephen Colbert on January 21, 2016. The song peaked at number 26 on Adult Alternative Songs. The album debuted at No. 17 on the Billboard 200, becoming Pop's highest-charting album in the US.

== Critical reception ==
Professional ratings
Aggregate scores
Source	Rating
AnyDecentMusic?	7.1/10
Metacritic	79/100
Review scores
Source	Rating
AllMusic	4/5 stars
The Daily Telegraph	5/5 stars
Entertainment Weekly	A−
The Guardian	3/5 stars
The Independent	3/5 stars
Mojo	4/5 stars
NME	5/5
Pitchfork	6.9/10
Q	4/5 stars
Rolling Stone	4/5 stars

Post Pop Depression received mostly positive reviews from music critics. At Metacritic, which assigns a normalized rating out of 100 to reviews from critics, the album received an average score of 79, which indicates "generally positive reviews", based on 33 reviews. Clash critic Josh Gray was positive in his review, writing that the record "is what it says on the tin and Iggy Pop is what every aspect the music revolves around". Matt Wilkinson of NME praised the album and gave it a perfect score, describing it as "an intelligent, sassy garage rock record that's obsessed with sex and death" and "a solid gold proof of his [Pop's] genius". Pitchfork's Stuart Berman stated that "if Post Pop Depression's refined execution has you missing the more unhinged Iggy of old, rest assured, he's not going down without a fight". Andy Gill of The Independent wrote that "it's as if he's [Pop's] grown so sick and tired of the veneers of respectability cocooning American sensibilities that, reverting to type once more, he wants to be your dog again". Aaron Cooper of BeardedGentlemenMusic stated that "if Post Pop Depression is the farewell record from Iggy Pop, his rant that closes out 'Paraguay' is a satisfying bookend to his fifty-year career as one of the most interesting characters in rock n' roll history".

In December 2016, the album was nominated for a Grammy Award in the Best Alternative Music Album category, losing to David Bowie's Blackstar.

=== Accolades ===
Accolades for Post Pop Depression
Publication	Accolade	Year	Rank	Ref.
Consequence of Sound	Top 50 Albums of 2016	2016	50	
The Guardian	The Best Albums of 2016	2016	38	
The Independent	Best Albums of 2016	2016	9	
Mojo	The 50 Best Albums of 2016	2016	6	
NME	NME's Albums of the Year 2016	2016	8	
Rolling Stone	50 Best Albums of 2016	2016	45	
Rough Trade	Albums of the Year	2016	1	

== Track listing ==
All tracks are written by Josh Homme and Iggy Pop, except where noted.

Post Pop Depression track listing
No.	Title	Writer(s)	Length
1.	"Break into Your Heart"		3:54
2.	"Gardenia"	Homme; Pop; Dean Fertita	4:14
3.	"American Valhalla"		4:38
4.	"In the Lobby"		4:14
5.	"Sunday"	Homme; Pop; Fertita	6:06
6.	"Vulture"	Homme; Pop; Fertita	3:15
7.	"German Days"		4:47
8.	"Chocolate Drops"	Homme; Pop; Fertita	3:58
9.	"Paraguay"		6:25
Total length:			41:31

== Personnel ==
- Iggy Pop – vocals (1–9), acoustic guitar (6)
- Josh Homme – vocals (1–8), gang vocals (9), guitar (1–4, 6, 7), acoustic guitar (8, 9), 12-string electric guitar (5), nylon guitar (9), lead guitar (2, 6), slide guitar (1), lead lap steel (8), bass (2–4, 7–9), piano (4–6, 9), Mellotron (6), synthesizer (1, 2), Fun Machine (4, 9), percussion (5), steel drum (3), chimes (6, 8), vibraphone (3, 8), Indians (6)
- Dean Fertita – gang vocals (9), guitar (2, 7), electric guitar (6), 12-string electric guitar (4, 9), lead bridge guitar (8), bass (5), keyed bass (1), piano (1, 6, 8), grand plinky piano (7), Wurlitzer (3), clavinet (5), synthesizer (2), Moog (1)
- Matt Helders – vocals (3, 5, 8), gang vocals (9), drums (1–5, 7–9), percussion (5, 6), marching snares (6), tom toms (6, 7), shaker (4), Indians (6)

Additional

- Daphne Chen – violin (5, 7, 9)
- Lauren Chipman – viola (5, 7, 9)
- Philip Blake Cooper – cimbassom (5, 7), tuba (3), C tuba (5, 7), F tuba (7), sousaphone (5, 7)
- Richard Dodd – cello (5, 7, 9)
- Lynne Fiddmont – backing vocals (5)
- Sharlotte Gibson – backing vocals (5)
- Eric Gorfain – violin (5, 7, 9)
- Jordan Katz – trumpet (3, 5, 7), valve trombone (5, 7), mellophone (5, 7)
- Danny T. Levine – trumpet (3, 5, 7), flugelhorn (5), cornet (7), valve trombone (3, 5), marching French horn (3), alto horn (7), euphonium (7)
- David Moyer – alto saxophone (7), tenor saxophone (5, 7), baritone saxophone (3, 7), flute (3, 5), piccolo (5), clarinet (5, 7)

== Charts ==
=== Weekly charts ===
Weekly chart performance for Post Pop Depression
Chart (2016)	Peak position
Australian Albums (ARIA)	7
Austrian Albums (Ö3 Austria)	5
Belgian Albums (Ultratop Flanders)	6
Belgian Albums (Ultratop Wallonia)	5
Canadian Albums (Billboard)	16
Danish Albums (Hitlisten)	17
Dutch Albums (Album Top 100)	5
Finnish Albums (Suomen virallinen lista)	3
French Albums (SNEP)	4
German Albums (Offizielle Top 100)	8
Greek Albums (IFPI)	14
Irish Albums (IRMA)	6
Italian Albums (FIMI)	18
New Zealand Albums (RMNZ)	11
Norwegian Albums (VG-lista)	10
Polish Albums (ZPAV)	19
Portuguese Albums (AFP)	12
Spanish Albums (Promusicae)	23
Swedish Albums (Sverigetopplistan)	13
Swiss Albums (Schweizer Hitparade)	3
UK Albums (Official Charts)	5
US Billboard 200	17

=== Year-end charts ===
Year-end chart performance for Post Pop Depression
Chart (2016)	Position
French Albums (SNEP)	152

== Sales ==
Sales for Post Pop Depression
Region	Certification	Certified units/sales
Canada	—	1,800
United Kingdom	—	40,261
United States	—	18,000
