= Préliminaires =

Studio album by Iggy Pop
- Released: May 25, 2009
- Recorded: Early 2009
- Studios: Massasoit Sound, Woodstock, New York; Crescent Moon Studios, Miami, Florida; The Groove Room, San Rafael, California
- Genres: Jazz; rock; blues
- Length: 36:19
- Labels: Astralwerks; Virgin
- Producer: Hal Cragin

Iggy Pop chronology
A Million in Prizes: The Anthology (2005)	Préliminaires (2009)	Roadkill Rising: The Bootleg Collection 1977–2009 (2011)

Singles from Préliminaires
- 1. "King of the Dogs" Released: 2009

Préliminaires is the fifteenth studio album by American rock singer Iggy Pop, released in Europe on May 25, 2009, by Astralwerks, and in the US on June 2. It was inspired by the singer's reading of Michel Houellebecq's novel La Possibilité d'une île (The Possibility of an Island).

== Style ==
Unlike his previous works, the album is less rock-oriented and was said by Pop to be a "quieter album with some jazz overtones" with its sound influenced by New Orleans jazz artists such as Louis Armstrong and Jelly Roll Morton. Pop also admitted that the album is his response to being "sick of listening to idiot thugs with guitars banging out crappy music".

The album includes a cover of the 1940s French jazz standard "Les feuilles mortes" ("Autumn Leaves"), which Pop sings in French. The song is most associated with such artists as Yves Montand and Édith Piaf. The album also includes "How Insensitive", a jazzy bossa nova standard composed by Antônio Carlos Jobim, and "Nice to Be Dead", more of a swamp rock song.

The visuals for the album were created by French-Iranian graphic novelist and animated film director Marjane Satrapi. Marjane and Pop met when she asked him to voice one of the characters in the English-language version of her Academy Award nominated movie Persepolis in 2007.

== Reception ==
Professional ratings
Aggregate scores
Source	Rating
Metacritic	66/100
Review scores
Source	Rating
AllMusic	3.5/5 stars
Drowned in Sound	4/10
The Guardian	4/5 stars
NME	8/10
Pitchfork	5.4/10
Rolling Stone	2.5/5 stars
Spin	3/5 stars

The album received a Metacritic score of 66 based on 27 reviews, indicating generally favorable reviews. Rolling Stone called it "definitely the weirdest record of the punk godfather's career".

It debuted at No. 187 on the Billboard 200, selling around 3,000 copies on its first week of release. Preliminaires has sold 10,000 copies in the United States as of February 2016.

== Track listing ==
1. "Les feuilles mortes" (music: Joseph Kosma; lyrics: Jacques Prévert) – 3:55
2. "I Want to Go to the Beach" (Iggy Pop) – 2:53
3. "King of the Dogs" (Lil Armstrong, Iggy Pop) – 2:02
4. "Je sais que tu sais" (Lucie Aimé, Hal Cragin, Iggy Pop) – 3:12
5. "Spanish Coast" (Hal Cragin, Iggy Pop) – 3:59
6. "Nice to Be Dead" (Hal Cragin, Iggy Pop) – 2:49
7. "How Insensitive" (Vinicius De Moraes, Ray Gilbert, Antônio Carlos Jobim) – 3:03
8. "Party Time" (Hal Cragin, Iggy Pop) – 2:08
9. "He's Dead / She's Alive" (Iggy Pop) – 2:00
10. "A Machine for Loving" (Hal Cragin, Michel Houellebecq, Iggy Pop; English translation by Gavin Bowd) – 3:16
11. "She's a Business" (Hal Cragin, Iggy Pop) – 3:11
12. "Les feuilles mortes (Marc's Theme)" (music: Joseph Kosma; lyrics: Jacques Prévert) – 3:53

== Personnel ==
- Iggy Pop – vocals, concept, guitar on "He's Dead, She's Alive"
- Hal Cragin – bass, guitar, percussion, keyboards, drum programming, producer, recording, mixing
- Kevin Hupp – drums (tracks 3, 4, 6, 7, 11), congas (tracks 1, 12)
- Jon Cowherd – piano on "King of the Dogs"
- Clarence L. Banks – trombone on "King of the Dogs"
- Tim Ouimette – trumpet on "King of the Dogs"
- Marc Phaneuf – clarinet on "Les feuilles mortes", "King of the Dogs" and "Les feuilles mortes (Marc's Theme)"
- Lucie Aimé – vocals on "Je sais que tu sais"

Technical

- Alfred Figueroa, Iggy Pop, Kevin Hupp – additional engineering
- Marjane Satrapi – cover painting

"King of the Dogs" contains elements of "King of the Zulus", written by Lillian Hardin Armstrong

== Charts ==
Chart performance for Préliminaires
Chart (2009)	Peak position
Belgian Albums (Ultratop Flanders)	76
Belgian Albums (Ultratop Wallonia)	39
French Albums (SNEP)	19
Italian Albums (FIMI)	71
Swedish Albums (Sverigetopplistan)	44
Swiss Albums (Schweizer Hitparade)	48
UK Albums (OCC)	200
US Billboard 200	187
