= Gardenia (Iggy Pop song) =

Single by Iggy Pop

from the album Post Pop Depression
- B-side: "Sunday"
- Released: January 22, 2016
- Recorded: January – March 2015 in California
- Genre: Alternative rock; post-punk; art rock
- Length: 4:14
- Label: Loma Vista
- Songwriter(s): Josh Homme; James Osterberg, Jr.; Dean Fertita
- Producer(s): Josh Homme

Iggy Pop singles chronology
"Waiting for the D Train" / "I'm Going Away Smiling" (2013)	"Gardenia" (2016)	"Sunday" (2016)

"Gardenia" is a song by American musician Iggy Pop. It was released as the lead single from his 17th studio album, Post Pop Depression (2016), on January 22, 2016. The song was premiered live on The Late Show with Stephen Colbert on the day of the song's release. The song received critical acclaim from music critics and peaked at number 136 on the French Singles Chart and number 26 on the Billboard Adult Alternative Songs chart.

== Critical reception ==
Evan Minsker of Pitchfork awarded "Gardenia" the site's "Best New Track" tag, commenting that "'Gardenia' is partially hypnotic thanks to the dreamy, trembling guitar drone, which sounds like something off mbv. His voice, ever the weighty and authoritative instrument, is given space to exist on its own, which is important for his poetry here. He's always exuded this dual nature of being absolutely charming—smiling, genteel—but behind those kind eyes is the former junkie slimeball that rolled around in glass. Both personalities are key to this song." Tom Breihan of Stereogum complimented the song and compared it to Pop's older works; "'Gardenia' has the same sort of mean, skeletal, machinelike groove that so many of those great old Iggy songs had."

== Track listing ==
- Loma Vista — LVR-39548-02

CD single
No.	Title	Length
1.	"Gardenia"	4:14
2.	"Sunday"	6:06

== Personnel ==
Personnel adapted from Post Pop Depression liner notes.

- Iggy Pop — vocals
- Josh Homme — guitar, production, slide guitar, synthesizer, vocals
- Dean Fertita — bass, Moog synthesizer, piano
- Matt Helders — drums

== Charts ==
Chart (2016)	Peak position
Belgium (Ultratip Bubbling Under Flanders)	35
Belgium (Ultratip Bubbling Under Wallonia)	38
France (SNEP)	136
Mexico Ingles Airplay (Billboard)	42
US Adult Alternative Songs (Billboard)	26
