= Iggy Pop =

American rock musician (born 1947)

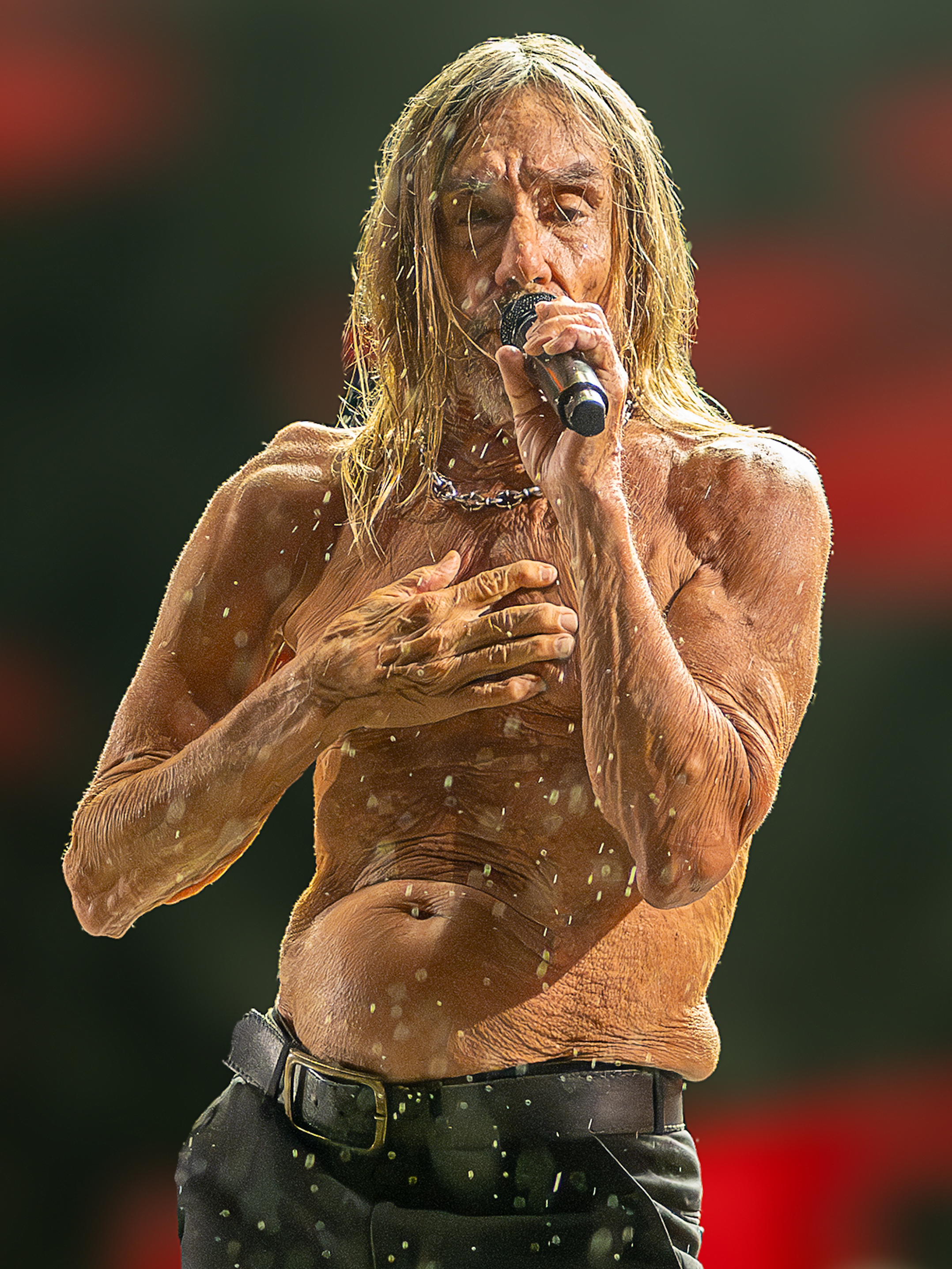
- Iggy Pop performing in 2025

Background information
- Born: James Newell Osterberg Jr. April 21, 1947 (age 79); Muskegon, Michigan, U.S.
- Origin: Ann Arbor, Michigan, U.S
- Genres: Rock; punk rock; proto-punk; hard rock; garage rock; glam punk
- Occupations: Singer; songwriter; musician; actor
- Instruments: Vocals; guitar; drums; keyboards
- Works: Discography; songs
- Years active: 1963–present
- Labels: Caroline International; Loma Vista; Virgin; RCA; Elektra; A&M
- Formerly of: The Stooges; The Trolls; The Iguanas; The Prime Movers
- Spouses: Wendy Weissberg (m. 1968; div. 1969) Suchi Asano (m. 1984; div. 1999) Nina Alu (m. 2008)
- Website: iggypop.com

Signature
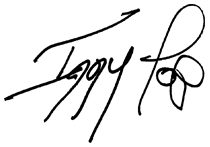

James Newell Osterberg Jr. (born April 21, 1947), known professionally as Iggy Pop, is an American singer, songwriter, musician, and actor who was the lead vocalist of the proto-punk band the Stooges. Regarded as the "Godfather of Punk", he is noted for his outrageous and unpredictable stage antics, poetic lyrics, and unique voice. He was named one of the 50 Great Voices by NPR, inducted into the Rock and Roll Hall of Fame as a member of the Stooges in 2010, and received a Grammy Lifetime Achievement Award in 2020 for his solo career.

He had a long collaborative relationship and friendship with David Bowie over the course of his career, beginning with the Stooges' album Raw Power in 1973. Both musicians went to West Berlin to wean themselves off their respective drug addictions and Pop began his solo career by collaborating with Bowie on the 1977 albums The Idiot and Lust for Life, Pop usually contributing the lyrics.

Initially playing a raw, primitive style of rock and roll (progressing later towards more experimental and aggressive rock), the Stooges sold few records in their original incarnation and gained a reputation for their confrontational performances, which sometimes involved acts of self-mutilation by Pop. He was one of the first performers to do a stage-dive and popularized the activity. Pop, who typically performs bare-chested, also performed such stage theatrics as rolling around in broken glass and exposing himself to the crowd.

Though his popularity has fluctuated, many of Pop's songs have become well known, including "Search and Destroy" and "I Wanna Be Your Dog" by the Stooges, and his solo hits "Lust for Life", "The Passenger" and "Real Wild Child (Wild One)". In 1990, he recorded his only Top 40 U.S. hit, "Candy", a duet with the B-52s' singer Kate Pierson. Pop's song "China Girl" became more widely known when it was re-recorded by co-writer Bowie, who released it as the second single from his most commercially successful album, Let's Dance (1983). Bowie re-recorded and performed many of Pop's songs throughout his career.

Although Pop has had limited commercial success, he has remained a cultural icon and a significant influence on a wide range of musicians in numerous genres. His music has encompassed a number of styles over the course of his career, including garage rock, punk rock, hard rock, heavy metal, art rock, new wave, grunge, jazz, blues and electronic. His vocal stylings ranged from "baritone croons [to] unhinged shrieks". The Stooges' album Raw Power has proved an influence on artists such as Sex Pistols, the Smiths, and Nirvana. His solo album The Idiot has been cited as a major influence on a number of post-punk, electronic and industrial artists including Depeche Mode, Nine Inch Nails and Joy Division, and was described by Siouxsie Sioux as a "re-affirmation that our suspicions were true: the man is a genius."

== Early life ==
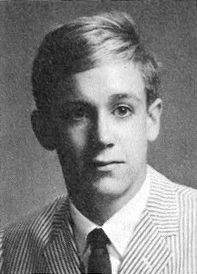
Osterberg as a high school senior, 1965

James Newell Osterberg Jr. was born in Muskegon, Michigan, on April 21, 1947, the son of Louella (née Christensen; 1917–1996) and James Newell Osterberg (1921–2007), an English teacher and baseball coach at Fordson High School in Dearborn, Michigan. He is of English, German, and Irish descent on his father's side, and Danish and Norwegian ancestry on his mother's side. His father was adopted by a Swedish-American nurse surnamed Osterberg. The family lived in a trailer park in Ypsilanti, Michigan.

As a child, Osterberg was interested in the industrial noises emanating from Michigan's manufacturing plants; he cites a visit to Ford's River Rouge Plant when he was nine as a particular inspiration for his musical development. Osterberg began to play drums in the fifth grade, first starting with rubber pads glued to plywood, before his parents bought him a drum set. In a 2007 Rolling Stone interview, he explained his relationship with his parents and their contribution to his music:

Once I hit junior high in Ann Arbor, I began going to school with the son of the president of Ford Motor Company, with kids of wealth and distinction. But I had a wealth that beat them all. I had the tremendous investment my parents made in me. I got a lot of care. They helped me explore anything I was interested in. This culminated in their evacuation from the master bedroom in the trailer, because that was the only room big enough for my drum kit. They gave me their bedroom.

He attended Tappan Junior High School, now Tappan Middle School. Ron Asheton later described him as having been a conventional teenager: "He hung out with the popular kids that wore chinos, cashmere sweaters, and penny loafers. Iggy didn't smoke cigarettes, didn't get high, didn't drink."

== Music career ==
=== 1960s ===
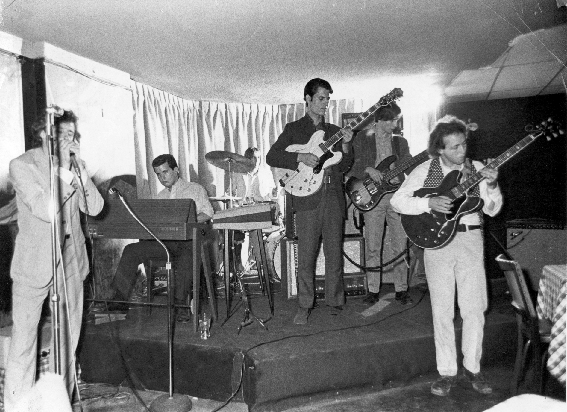
The Prime Movers, featuring Pop on drums

Osterberg began his music career as a drummer in various high school bands in Ann Arbor, Michigan, including the Iguanas, who covered several records such as Bo Diddley's "Mona" in 1965. He then began exploring local blues-style bands such as the Prime Movers (with brothers Dan and Michael Erlewine), which he joined at 18 years old. The Prime Movers gave him the nickname "Iggy" for having played in the Iguanas. According to biographer Jim Ambrose, the two years he spent in the band made him aware of "art, politics, and experimentation".

Osterberg eventually dropped out of the University of Michigan and moved to Chicago to learn more about blues. While in Chicago, he played drums in blues clubs, helped by Sam Lay (formerly of the Paul Butterfield Blues Band) who shared his connections with Pop. Inspired by Chicago blues as well as bands like the Sonics, MC5 and the Doors, he formed the Psychedelic Stooges. The band was composed of Osterberg on vocals, Ron Asheton on guitar, Asheton's brother Scott on drums, and Dave Alexander on bass. Their first show was played at a Halloween party at a house in Detroit, Michigan. Members of the MC5 were also in attendance. Osterberg became interested in Ron Asheton after seeing him perform in the Chosen Few (a covers band), believing "I've never met a convincing musician that didn't look kind of ill and kind of dirty, and Ron had those two things covered!" The three nicknamed Osterberg "Pop" after a local character named Jim Popp, who he was said to have resembled after shaving his eyebrows.

The seeds of Pop's stage persona were sown when he saw the Doors perform in 1967 at the University of Michigan and was amazed by the stage antics and antagonism displayed by singer Jim Morrison. Morrison's extreme behavior, while performing in a popular band, inspired the young Pop to push the boundaries of stage performance. Other influences on Pop's vocals and persona were Mick Jagger and James Brown:

I attended two concerts by the Doors. The first one I attended was early on and they had not gotten their shit together yet. That show was a big, big, big influence on me. They had just had their big hit, "Light My Fire" and the album had taken off. ... So, here's this guy, out of his head on acid, dressed in leather with his hair all oiled and curled. The stage was tiny and it was really low. It got confrontational. I found it really interesting. I loved the performance ... Part of me was like, "Wow, this is great. He's really pissing people off and he's lurching around making these guys angry." People were rushing the stage and Morrison's going "Fuck you. You blank, blank, blank." You can fill in your sexual comments yourself. The other half of it was that I thought, "If they've got a hit record out and they can get away with this, then I have no fucking excuse not to get out on stage with my band." It was sort of the case of, "Hey, I can do that." There really was some of that in there.

In addition to Jim Morrison and the Doors' influence on the band, Pop also attributes the Stooges getting jump-started after seeing an all-girl rock band from Princeton, New Jersey, called the Untouchable. In a 1995 interview with Bust, he relates:

And the other thing was we went to New York. We had gone to New York a couple of months before that just to check out the scene, and we had never been to a place like New York ... we went down around Eighth Street there where all the young tourists hang out, and we met these girls from New Jersey, from Princeton, they had a band called The Untouchable, and we're like, "Oh, you've got a band, sure, ha ha ha," and they said "Well, come to our house and see us play." And we didn't have anywhere to crash, and they played for us, and they completely rocked, and we were really ashamed.

In 1968, one year after their live debut and now dubbed the Psychedelic Stooges, the band signed with Elektra Records, again following in the footsteps of the Doors, who were Elektra's biggest act at the time. In the 2016 Jim Jarmusch documentary film about the Stooges, Gimme Danger, Pop tells of guitarist Ron Asheton calling Moe Howard to see if it was all right to call the band "The Stooges", to which Howard responded by merely saying "I don't care what they call themselves, as long as they're not The Three Stooges!" and hung up the phone.

The Stooges' first album The Stooges (on which Pop was credited as "Iggy Stooge") was produced by John Cale in New York in 1969.

=== 1970s ===
The Stooges and the follow-up, Fun House, produced by Don Gallucci in Los Angeles in 1970, sold poorly. Though the release of Fun House did not receive the recognition expected, it was later ranked No. 94 in Rolling Stone's '500 Greatest Albums of All Time' in 2023. Shortly after the release of Fun House, the group disbanded because of Pop's worsening heroin addiction.

In 1971, without a record deal, the Stooges kept performing in small clubs with a five-piece lineup that included both Ron Asheton and James Williamson on guitars and Jimmy Recca on bass, Pop having fired Dave Alexander the previous year when he turned up for a gig unable to play because of his chronic alcoholism. That year Pop and David Bowie met at Max's Kansas City, a nightclub and restaurant in New York City. Pop's career received a boost from his relationship with Bowie when Bowie decided in 1972 to produce an album with him in England. With Williamson signed on as guitarist, the search began for a rhythm section. However, since neither Pop nor Williamson were satisfied with any players in England, they decided to re-unite the Stooges. Ron Asheton grudgingly moved from guitar to bass. The recording sessions produced the rock landmark Raw Power. After its release, Scott Thurston was added to the band on keyboards/electric piano and Bowie continued his support, but Pop's drug problem persisted. The Stooges' last show in 1974 ended in a fight between the band and a group of bikers, documented on the album Metallic K.O. Drug abuse stalled Pop's career again for several years.

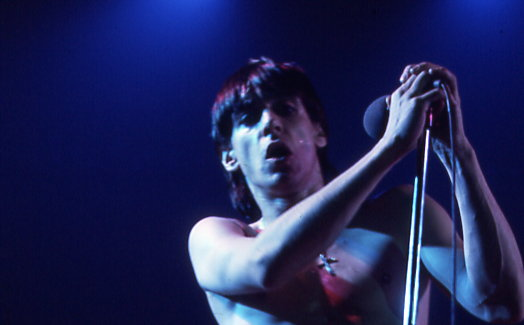
Iggy Pop performing in Toronto, 1977

After the Stooges' second breakup, Pop made recordings with James Williamson, but these were not released until 1977 (as Kill City, credited jointly to Pop and Williamson). Pop was unable to control his drug use and checked himself into a mental institution, the UCLA Neuropsychiatric Institute, to try to clean up. Bowie was one of his few visitors, continuing to support his friend and collaborator. In 1976, Bowie took Pop as his companion on the Station to Station tour. This was Pop's first exposure to large-scale professional touring, and he was impressed, particularly with Bowie's work ethic. Following a March 21, 1976, show, Bowie and Pop were arrested together for marijuana possession in Rochester, New York, although charges were later dropped.

Bowie and Pop relocated to West Berlin to wean themselves off their respective drug addictions. "Living in a Berlin apartment with Bowie and his friends was interesting…" Pop recalled. "The big event of the week was Thursday night. Anyone who was still alive and able to crawl to the sofa would watch Starsky & Hutch."

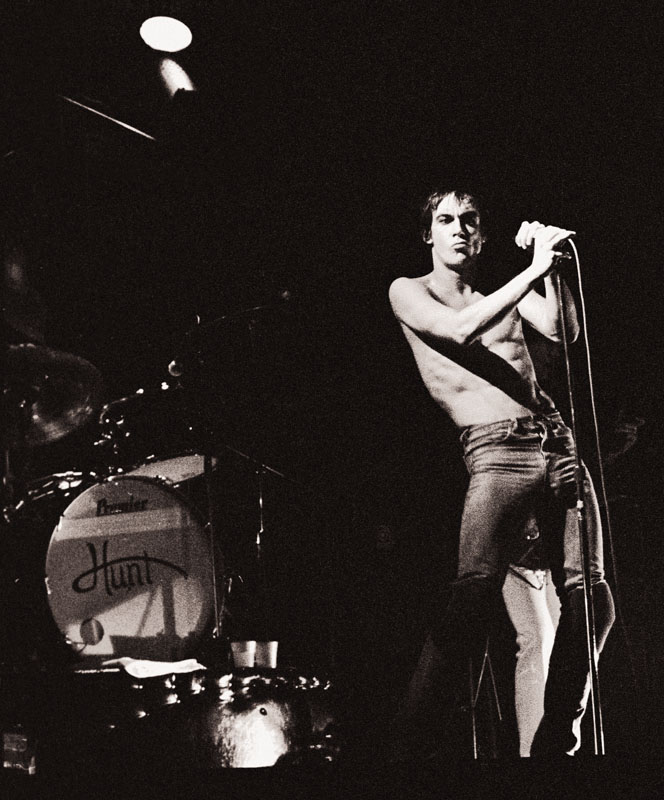
Iggy Pop on October 25, 1977, at the State Theatre in Minneapolis

In 1977, Pop signed with RCA Records. Bowie helped write and produce The Idiot and Lust for Life, Pop's two most acclaimed albums as a solo artist, the latter featuring one of his best-known songs, "The Passenger". Lust for Life featured another team of brothers, Hunt and Tony Fox Sales, sons of comedian Soupy Sales. Among the songs Bowie and Pop wrote together were "China Girl", "Tonight", and "Sister Midnight", all of which Bowie performed on his own albums later (the last being recorded with different lyrics as "Red Money" on Lodger). Bowie also played keyboards in Pop's live performances, some of which are featured on the album TV Eye Live in 1978. In return, Pop contributed backing vocals on Bowie's Low.

"Artistically, I really like those two records, The Idiot and Lust for Life," Pop said. "But I was personally just miserable… David was a really good friend to me in many ways, but… he had his whole thing going on and a whole apparatus of people around him, and problems that he had to face. For more than a year, I lived in the room next door, and I had a good friendship, but it wasn't the same as being in a band."

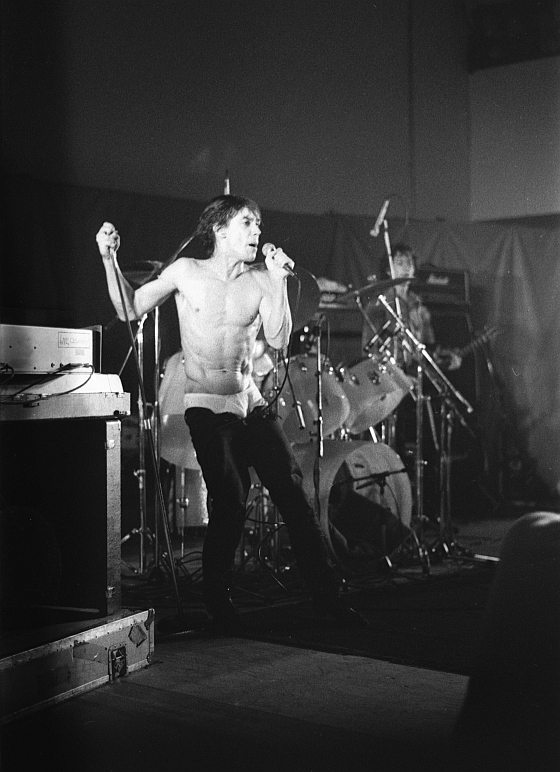
Iggy Pop in Cardiff, 1979

Pop had grown dissatisfied with RCA, later admitting that he had made TV Eye Live as a quick way of fulfilling his three-album RCA contract. He moved to Arista Records, under whose banner he released New Values in 1979. This album was something of a Stooges reunion, with James Williamson producing and latter-day Stooge Scott Thurston playing guitar and keyboards. Not surprisingly, the album's style harkened back to the guitar sound of the Stooges. New Values was not a commercial success in the U.S. but has since been highly regarded by critics.

The album was moderately successful in Australia and New Zealand, however, and this led to Pop's first visit there to promote it. While in Melbourne, he made a memorable appearance on the Australian Broadcasting Corporation's nationwide show Countdown. During his anarchic performance of "I'm Bored", Pop made no attempt to conceal the fact that he was lip-synching (shoving the microphone down his pants at one point), and he even tried to grab the teenage girls in the audience. He was also interviewed by host Molly Meldrum, an exchange which was frequently punctuated by the singer jumping up and down on his chair and making loud exclamations of "G'day mate" in a mock Australian accent. His Countdown appearance is generally considered one of the highlights of the show's history and it cemented his popularity with Australian punk fans, since then he has often toured there. While visiting New Zealand, Pop recorded a music video for "I'm Bored" and attended a record company function where he appeared to slap a woman and throw wine over a photographer. While in Australia, Pop was also the guest on a live late-night commercial TV interview show on the Ten Network. The Countdown appearance has often been re-screened in Australia.

=== 1980s ===
During the recording of Soldier (1980), Pop and Bowie argued with Williamson over various aspects of the project. Williamson recalled, "I was not at all happy with a number of aspects of that record including the band, the material and the recording facilities. So I was unhappy in general and vice versa". Williamson left the project. Bowie appeared on the song "Play it Safe", performing backing vocals with the group Simple Minds. During a live performance in Brooklyn in 1981, Pop smashed a microphone into his own face, knocking out a front tooth. Both Soldier and its follow-up Party (1981) were commercial failures, and Pop was dropped from Arista.

The 1982 album Zombie Birdhouse on Chris Stein's Animal label, with Stein himself producing, was no more commercially successful than his Arista works. The same year, Pop published his autobiography I Need More, co-written with Anne Wehrer, an Ann Arbor performance artist. The book, which includes a selection of black and white photographs, featured a foreword by Andy Warhol. Warhol wrote that he met Pop when he was Jim Osterberg, at the Ann Arbor Film Festival in 1966. "I don't know why he hasn't made it really big," Warhol wrote. "He is so good." In 1983, Pop's fortunes changed when David Bowie recorded a cover of the song "China Girl". The song had originally appeared on The Idiot and was a major hit on Bowie's blockbuster Let's Dance album. As co-writer of the song, Pop received substantial royalties.

On Tonight in 1984, Bowie recorded five more of their co-written songs, two from Lust for Life, one from New Values, and two new songs), assuring Pop financial security, at least for the short term. The support from Bowie enabled Pop to take a three-year break, during which he overcame his resurgent heroin addiction and took acting classes.

Additionally, Pop contributed the title song to the 1984 film Repo Man (with Steve Jones, previously of the Sex Pistols, on guitar, and Nigel Harrison and Clem Burke, both of Blondie on bass and drums) as well as an instrumental called "Repo Man Theme" that was played during the opening credits.

In 1985, Pop recorded some demos with Jones. He played these demos for Bowie, who was sufficiently impressed to offer to produce an album for Pop: 1986's new wave-influenced Blah-Blah-Blah, featuring the single "Real Wild Child", a cover of "The Wild One", originally written and recorded by Australian rock 'n' roll musician Johnny O'Keefe in 1958. The single was a Top 10 hit in the UK and was successful around the world, especially in Australia, where it has been used since 1987 as the theme music for the ABC's late-night music video show Rage. Blah-Blah-Blah was Pop's highest-charting album in the U.S. since The Idiot in 1977, peaking at No. 75 on the Billboard 200 chart.

Also in 1985, Pop and Lou Reed contributed their singing voices to the animated film Rock & Rule. Pop performed the song "Pain & Suffering" in the final sequence of the film. Pop's music appeared on the soundtrack to the 1986 film Dogs in Space.

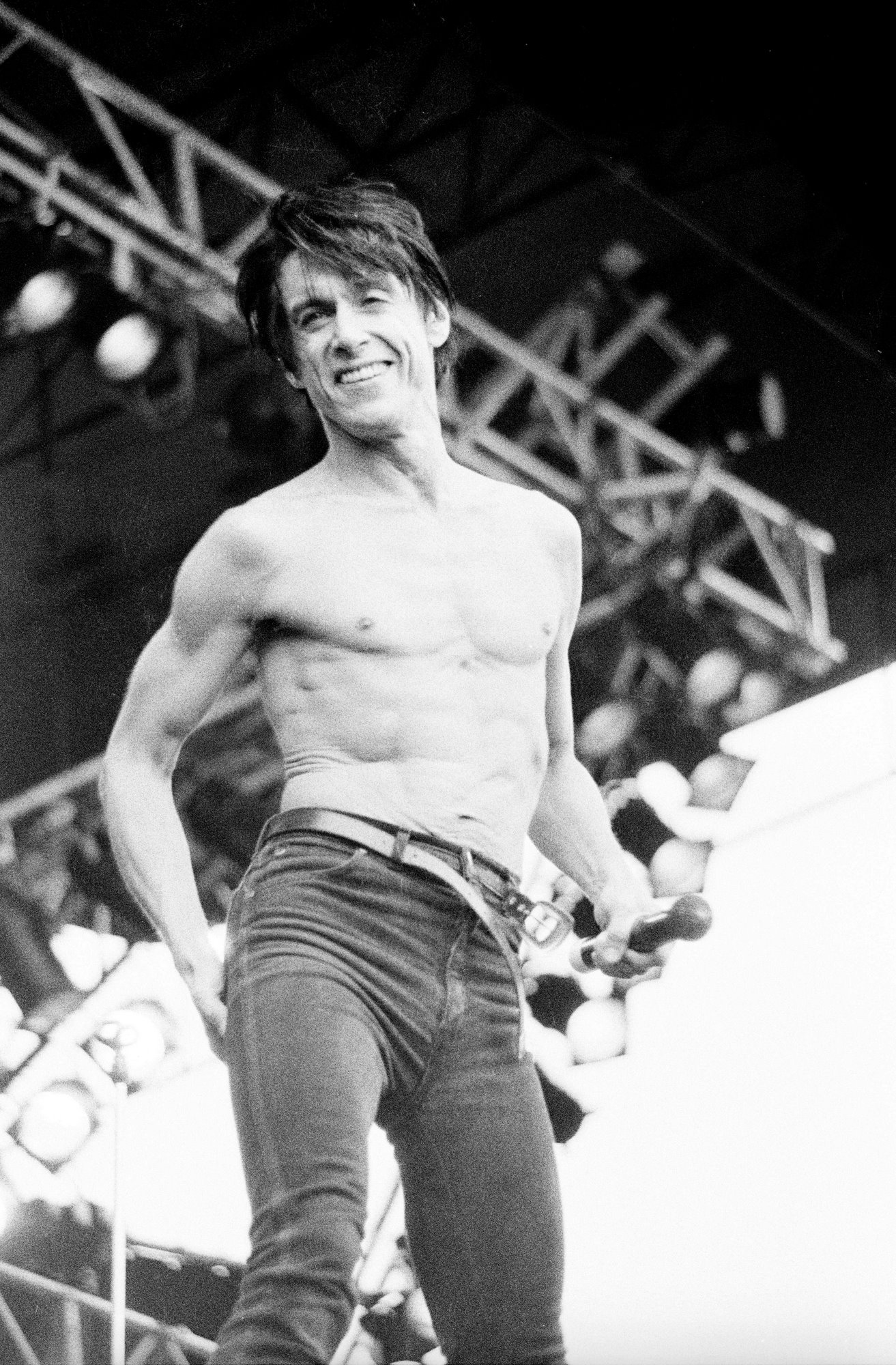
Iggy Pop at the Pinkpop Festival in 1987

In 1987, Pop appeared (along with Bootsy Collins) on a mostly instrumental album, Neo Geo, by Japanese composer Ryuichi Sakamoto. The music video for "Risky", written and directed by Meiert Avis, won the first MTV Breakthrough Video Award. The groundbreaking video explores transhumanist philosopher FM-2030's ideas of Nostalgia for the Future in the form of an imagined love affair between a robot and one of Man Ray's models in Paris in the late 1930s. Additional inspiration was drawn from Jean Baudrillard, Edvard Munch's 1894 painting Puberty, and Roland Barthes Death of the Author. The surrealist black-and-white video uses stop motion, light painting, and other retro in-camera effects techniques. Meiert Avis recorded Sakamoto while at work on the score for The Last Emperor in London. Sakamoto also appears in the video painting words and messages to an open shutter camera. Pop, who performs the vocals on "Risky", chose not to appear in the video, allowing his performance space to be occupied by the surrealist era robot.

Pop's follow-up to Blah Blah Blah, Instinct (1988), was a turnaround in musical direction. Its stripped-back, guitar-based sound leaned further towards the sound of the Stooges than any of his solo albums to date. His record label dropped him, but the King Biscuit Flower Hour radio show recorded the Instinct tour (featuring guitarist Andy McCoy and Alvin Gibbs on bass) in Boston on July 19, 1988. Working with rock attorney Stann Findelle, Pop scored more movie soundtrack inclusions in 1989: "Living on the Edge of the Night" in the Ridley Scott thriller Black Rain; and "Love Transfusion", a song originally written by Alice Cooper (who does backing vocals) and Desmond Child, in Wes Craven's Shocker. Also, at the same time, Pop, dissatisfied from RCA's decisions, revoked copyrights of his RCA releases, assigned it to his company Thousand Mile, and signed a contract with Virgin Records, which was a unique hybrid of distribution deal for his RCA releases and a recording contract for new albums. Virgin first reissued Lust for Life and The Idiot in 1990, then TV Eye Live 1977 in 1994.

=== 1990s ===
In 1990, Pop recorded Brick by Brick. The album was produced by Don Was and featured members of Guns N' Roses and the B-52's as guests. His Kiss My Blood video (1991) was directed by Tim Pope and filmed at the Olympia in Paris. The video attracted much controversy, as it included footage of Pop performing with his penis exposed to the audience. Brick by Brick featured his first Top 40 U.S. hit, "Candy", a duet with B-52's singer Kate Pierson.

Also in 1990, Pop sang the role of "The Prosecutor" for the POINT Music/Philips Classics recording (released in 1992) of composer John Moran's multimedia opera The Manson Family. That year he also contributed to the Red Hot Organization's AIDS benefit album Red Hot + Blue project, singing a version of "Well Did You Evah!" in a duet with Debbie Harry.

In the early to middle 1990s, Pop would make several guest appearances on the Nickelodeon show The Adventures of Pete and Pete. He played James Mecklenberg, Nona Mecklenberg's father.

In 1991, Pop and Kirst contributed the song "Why Was I Born (Freddy's Dead)" to the soundtrack of the film Freddy's Dead: The Final Nightmare. The song also plays over the end credits of the film, with a compilation of clips from the A Nightmare on Elm Street series running alongside the end credits. In the same year, Pop sang a leading role in the John Moran opera The Manson Family.

In 1992, he collaborated with Goran Bregović on the soundtrack for the movie Arizona Dream by Emir Kusturica. Pop sang four of the songs: In the Deathcar, TV Screen, Get the Money, and This is a Film. Also in 1992, he collaborated with the New York City band White Zombie. He recorded spoken word vocals on the intro and outro of the song "Black Sunshine" as well as playing the character of a writer in the video shot for the song.

In 1993, Pop released American Caesar, including two successful singles, "Wild America" and "Beside You". The following year Pop contributed to Buckethead's album Giant Robot, including the songs "Buckethead's Toy Store" and "Post Office Buddy". He appears also on the Les Rita Mitsouko album Système D where he sings the duet "My Love is Bad" with Catherine Ringer.

In 1996, Pop again found mainstream fame when his 1977 song "Lust for Life" was featured in the film Trainspotting. A new video was recorded for the song, with clips from the film and studio footage of Pop dancing with one of the film's stars, Ewen Bremner. A Pop concert also served as a plot point in the film. The song has also been used in TV commercials for Royal Caribbean and as the theme music to The Jim Rome Show, a nationally syndicated American sports talk show.

In 1996, Pop released Naughty Little Doggie and the single "I Wanna Live". Pop was injured during a show in 1997 when he dove from the stage of the Polaris Amphitheatre and the crowd failed to catch him, resulting in a dislocated shoulder and tendon damage. Around this time, he remixed Raw Power to give it a rougher, more hard-edged sound; fans had complained for years that Bowie's official "rescue effort" mix was muddy and lacking in bass. Pop testified in the reissue's liner notes that on the new mix, "everything's still in the red". Also in 1997, Pop was credited with the soundtrack to the film The Brave.

On January 1, 1998, Pop made a guest appearance on Paramount Television's science fiction series Star Trek: Deep Space Nine. Pop played a Vorta in an episode based upon the film The Magnificent Seven, titled "The Magnificent Ferengi". Pop also contributed the theme song for Space Goofs.

Pop co-produced his 1999 album Avenue B with Don Was, releasing the single "Corruption". Pop also sang on the 1999 Death in Vegas UK Top-10 single Aisha. The same year he appeared on Hashisheen: The End of Law, a collaborative effort by Bill Laswell, reading on the tracks "The Western Lands" and "A Quick Trip to Alamut".

=== 2000s ===
Pop sang on the tracks "Rolodex Propaganda" and "Enfilade" by At the Drive-In in 2000. In 2001, he released Beat 'Em Up, which gave birth to the Trolls, releasing the single "Football" featuring Trolls alumni Whitey Kirst and brother Alex. Pop's music appeared on the soundtrack to the 2001 film He Died with a Felafel in his Hand. In 2005, Pop appeared, along with Madonna, Little Richard, Bootsy Collins, and the Roots' Questlove, in an American TV commercial for the Motorola ROKR phone.

Pop's 2003 album Skull Ring featured collaborators Sum 41, Green Day, Peaches, and the Trolls, as well as Ron and Scott Asheton, reuniting the three surviving founding members of the Stooges for the first time since 1974. Pop made a guest appearance on Peaches's song "Kick It" as well as the video. Also in 2003, the first full-length biography of Pop was published. Gimme Danger – The Story of Iggy Pop was written by Joe Ambrose; Pop did not collaborate on the biography or publicly endorse it.

Having enjoyed working with the Ashetons on Skull Ring, Pop reformed the Stooges, with bassist Mike Watt (formerly of the Minutemen) filling in for the late Dave Alexander and Fun House saxophonist Steve Mackay rejoining the lineup. That year, Pop opened Madonna's Reinvention World Tour in Dublin.

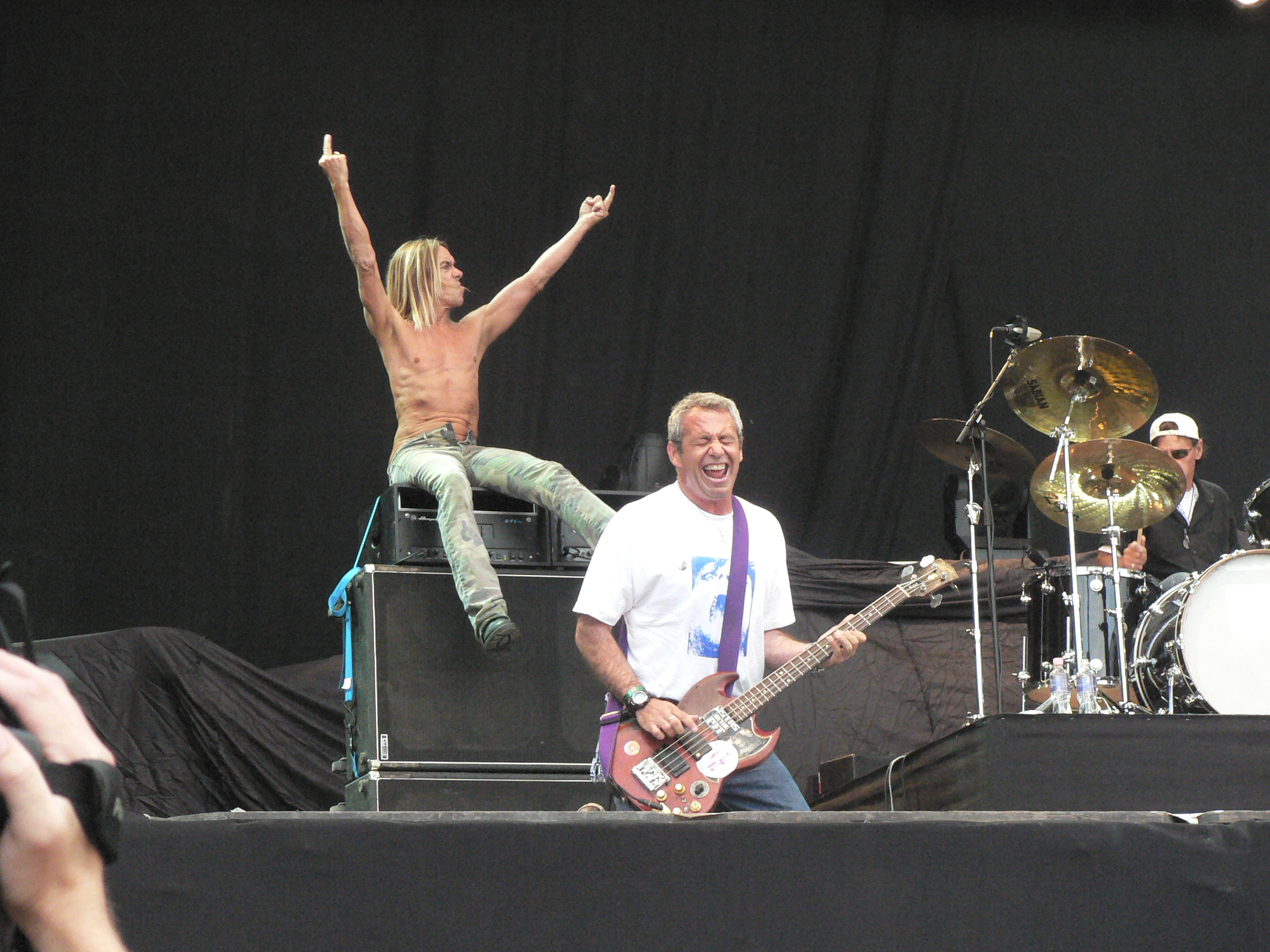
The Stooges at Sziget Festival 2006

In early 2006, Pop and the Stooges played in Australia and New Zealand for the Big Day Out. They also began work on a new album, The Weirdness, which was recorded by Steve Albini and released in March 2007. In August 2006, Pop and the Stooges performed at the Lowlands pop festival in the Netherlands, Hodokvas in Slovakia and in the Sziget Festival in Budapest.

Author Paul Trynka completed a biography of Pop (with his blessing) called Open Up and Bleed, published in early 2007. In February 2007, Pop and the Stooges played at Bam Margera's wedding and Pop appeared on the single "Punkrocker" with the Teddybears in a Cadillac television commercial. Pop was also the voice of Lil' Rummy on the Comedy Central cartoon Lil' Bush and confirmed that he has done voices for American Dad! and Grand Theft Auto IV, which also included the Stooges song "I Wanna Be Your Dog" (though the game's manual credited Iggy Pop as the artist).

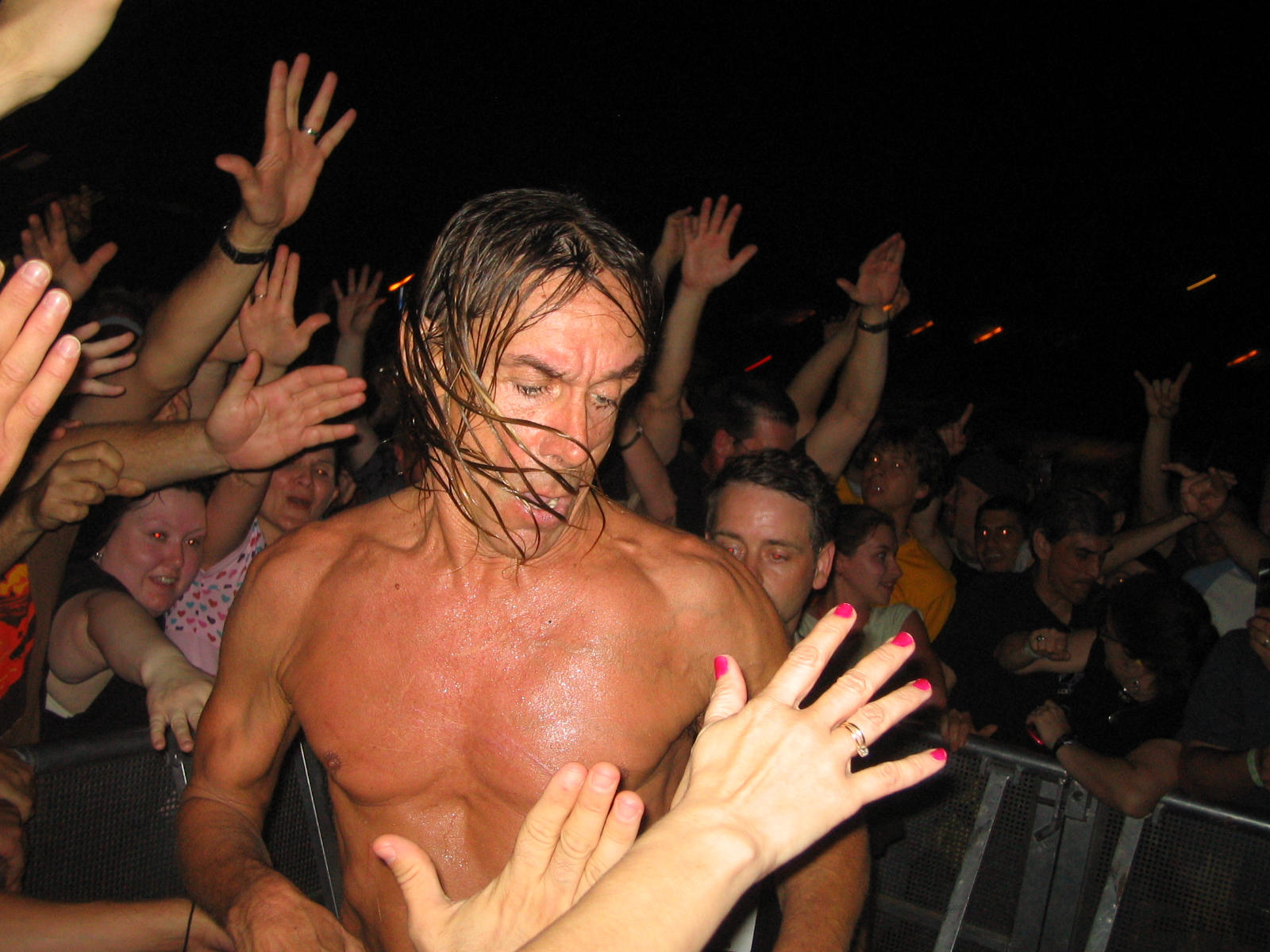
Iggy Pop at Beale Street Music Festival, Memphis in May, 2007

Pop and the Stooges played the Glastonbury Festival in June 2007. Their set included material from the 2007 album The Weirdness and classics such as "No Fun" and "I Wanna Be Your Dog". Pop also caused controversy in June 2007 when he was interviewed on the BBC's coverage of the Glastonbury Festival. He used the phrase "paki shop", apparently unaware of its racist connotations, prompting three complaints and an apology from the BBC.

Pop guested on Profanation, the new album by the Bill Laswell-helmed group Praxis, which was released on January 1, 2008.

On March 10, 2008, Pop appeared at Madonna's induction into the Rock and Roll Hall of Fame at the Waldorf Astoria Hotel in New York. Together with the Stooges, he sang raucous versions of two Madonna hits, "Burning Up" and "Ray of Light". Before leaving the stage, he looked directly at Madonna, quoting "You make me feel shiny and new, like a virgin, touched for the very first time", from Madonna's hit song "Like a Virgin". According to guitarist Ron Asheton, Madonna asked the Stooges to perform in her place, as a protest to the Rock and Roll Hall of Fame for not inducting the Stooges, despite six appearances on the nomination ballot. Pop also sang on the "No Fun" cover by Asian Dub Foundation on their 2008 album Punkara.

On January 6, 2009, original Stooges guitarist and Pop's self-described best friend Ron Asheton was found dead from an apparent heart attack. He was 60 years old. In 2009, James Williamson rejoined the band after 29 years. On December 15, 2009, it was announced that the Stooges would be inducted into The Rock and Roll Hall of Fame on March 15, 2010. Pop had "about two hours of a strong emotional reaction" to the news.

Pop collaborated with Danger Mouse and Sparklehorse on the album Dark Night of the Soul, singing the track "Pain".

Pop's fifteenth solo album, Préliminaires, was released on June 2, 2009. Inspired by a novel by French author Michel Houellebecq called La Possibilité d'une île (2005; Trans. as The Possibility of an Island by Gavin Bowd, 2006), Pop was approached to provide the soundtrack for a documentary film on Houellebecq and his attempts to make a film from his novel. He describes this new release as a "quieter album with some jazz overtones", the first single off the album, "King of the Dogs", bearing a sound strongly influenced by New Orleans jazz musicians such as Louis Armstrong and Jelly Roll Morton. Pop said that the song was his response to being "sick of listening to idiot thugs with guitars banging out crappy music". The album is available on legal download sites, CD, and a deluxe box set is available at only 6000 units worldwide. This box set contains the Préliminaires album, a collector "Les Feuilles Mortes" b/w "King of the Dogs" 7 inch, the cover of which is Pop's portrait by Marjane Satrapi, and a 38-page booklet of drawings also by Marjane Satrapi.

In January 2009, Pop was signed up as the face of Swiftcover, the UK-based online insurance company. He fronted a £25 million TV ad campaign for Swiftcover, using the strapline "Get a Life". The advert was then banned by the Advertising Standards Authority on April 28, 2009, for being misleading – it implied that Pop himself had an insurance policy with Swiftcover when at the time the company did not insure musicians.

=== 2010s ===
Pop also sings on "We're All Gonna Die" on Slash's first solo album Slash, which was released in April 2010. He appeared as a character in the video game Lego Rock Band to sing his song "The Passenger" and also lent his voice for the in-game tutorial. With reference to the song "The Passenger", Pop has appeared on NZ television advertising phone networks, showing that he could get a band to play together by conference call. He was inducted as part of the Stooges into the Rock and Roll Hall of Fame on March 15, 2010.

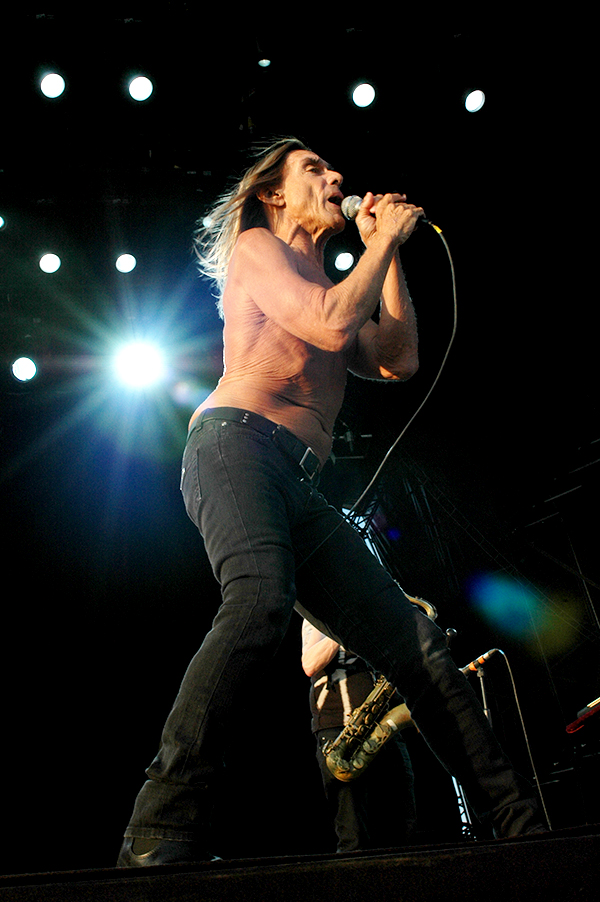
Iggy Pop at the UK Hop Farm Festival, July 2011

After a March 2010 stage diving accident, Pop claimed he would no longer stage dive. However, he did so on three occasions at a concert in Madrid, Spain on April 30, 2010, and did similarly at London's Hammersmith Apollo on May 2, 2010. On July 9, 2010, Pop again stage dived at Rock Zottegem, Belgium, causing bleeding from the face. In June 2010, Pop appeared at Yonge and Dundas Square in Toronto with the reformed Stooges on the NXNE main stage. In 2011 he teamed up with the Lilies, a collaboration between Sergio Dias of Os Mutantes and French group Tahiti Boy & The Palmtree Family, to record the single "Why?".

Pop lent his image to PETA's campaign against the annual Canada seal hunt.

On April 7, 2011, at age 63, Pop performed "Real Wild Child" on the tenth season of American Idol; the Los Angeles Times music blog "Iggy Pop & Hiss" described Pop as being "still magnetic, still disturbing". He is also featured on Kesha's song "Dirty Love" on her second album Warrior. In 2012, Pop was voted into the Michigan Rock and Roll Legends Hall of Fame. On August 25, 2013, Iggy and the Stooges co-headlined RiotFest 2013's Day 2, performing in Toronto and Denver along with the Replacements. Stooges drummer Scott Asheton died of a heart attack in March 2014 at the age of 64.

On October 14, 2014, Pop gave the fourth annual BBC Music John Peel Lecture in Salford, on the topic of "Free Music in a Capitalist Society". He used the lecture to discuss his experiences of the music industry, and his reflections on the effect of the internet on the consumption of music and the broader media.

In January 2015, it was announced that Pop contributed the theme song to Alex Cox's film Bill, the Galactic Hero. He also collaborated with New Order on the song "Stray Dog" of their album Music Complete released in September of that year. Pop also collaborated with Tomoyasu Hotei on the songs "How The Cookie Crumbles" and "Walking Through The Night" from the album Strangers, also released that same year.

On June 22, 2016, Stooges guitarist James Williamson made an official statement saying that the Stooges were no more:

The Stooges is over. Basically, everybody's dead except Iggy and I. So it would be sort-of ludicrous to try and tour as Iggy and the Stooges when there's only one Stooge in the band and then you have side guys. That doesn't make any sense to me.

Williamson also added that touring had become boring, and trying to balance the band's career as well as Pop's was a difficult task.

In 2016, Pop recorded an album with Josh Homme titled Post Pop Depression. The album was released on March 18, with a tour of Europe and North America entitled Post Pop Depression Tour to follow, starting from March 28. On both sides of the Atlantic, the album set a new peak chart position for Iggy Pop albums, becoming his first US Top 20 album and first UK Top 5 album.

On October 28, 2016, Pop released the double live album Post Iggy Pop Depression: Live At The Royal Albert Hall on Eagle Rock Entertainment (on DVD+2CD and digital formats).

In 2017, Pop composed and performed vocals on the Oneohtrix Point Never song "The Pure and the Damned" on the soundtrack for the crime film Good Time.

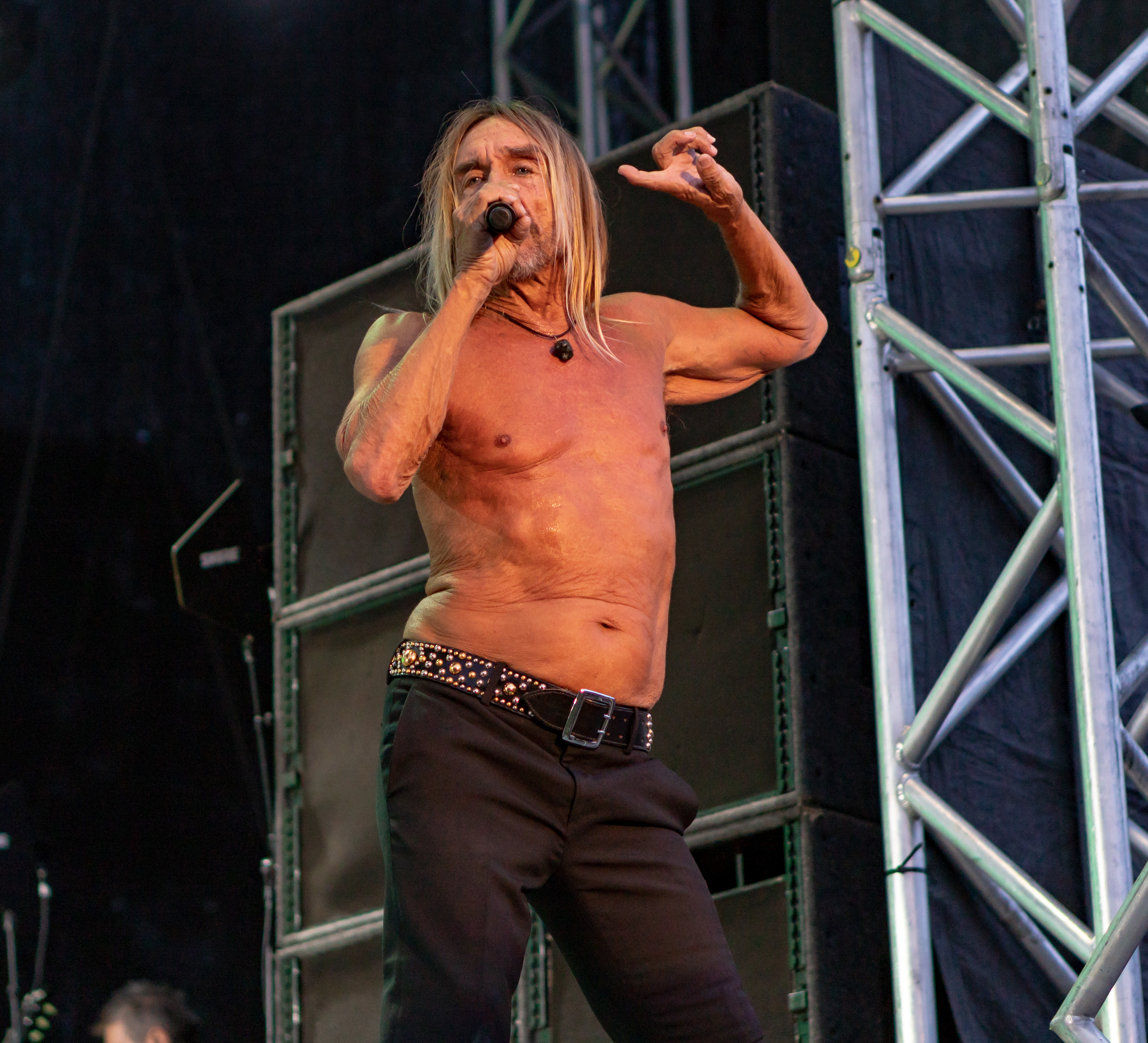
Iggy Pop performing in 2018

On July 27, 2018, Pop released a joint EP with Underworld, titled Teatime Dub Encounters. Pop and Underworld had both contributed tracks to Danny Boyle's 1996 movie Trainspotting.

Pop's eighteenth studio album, Free, was released on September 6, 2019.

=== 2020s ===
In January 2020, Pop received a Grammy Lifetime Achievement Award. In April 2020, he released an alternate mix of his "China Girl", as part of a seven-disc deluxe box set, due to feature expanded remastered versions of The Idiot and Lust for Life. In August, Pop was featured in a tailoring campaign for Gucci which also starred Tyler the Creator and A$AP Rocky. In December, Pop featured on a rework of Elvis Costello's song "No Flag" from Costello's 2020 album Hey Clockface. The song was a re-recording, with Pop providing the vocals, translated to French for this version. A new digital track by Pop was also released, titled "Dirty Little Virus". Lyrically, it is about the COVID-19 pandemic. That year, he also collaborated with Morrissey on his upcoming album Bonfire of Teenagers.

In April 2021, French singer Clio released a duet with Iggy Pop titled "L'appartement". On his new album Breathe by Hammond master Lonnie Smith, Pop provides vocals on two tracks, "Why Can't We Live Together" (a cover version of the Timmy Thomas original) and on "Sunshine Superman" (a cover version of the Donovan original). The album was released in March 2021.

Pop collaborated with Belgian composer and violinist Catherine Graindorge on three tracks on her new EP The Dictator. It was released in September 2022. "Frenzy" was released late 2022 ahead of Pop's nineteenth studio album Every Loser: the track featured Duff McKagan and Chad Smith. The album was produced by Andrew Watt. Upon release in January 2023. Every Loser received favourable reviews with NME dubbing it "a high-velocity joyride full of delightful doses of wit and grit". At around this time, Pop said he was done with stagediving. In 2024 he re-recorded "The Passenger" in duet with Siouxsie Sioux: their orchestral version with a slower tempo was conceived for a commercial.

In May 2025, he collaborated with the champagne brand Dom Pérignon for a campaign named "Creation is an Eternal Journey".

In 2025, Pop's 2006 collaboration "Punkrocker" with Teddybears was featured in the superhero film Superman.

On September 27, 2025, Pop headlined the "CBGB Festival" in Brooklyn NY.

== Film, television and radio career ==
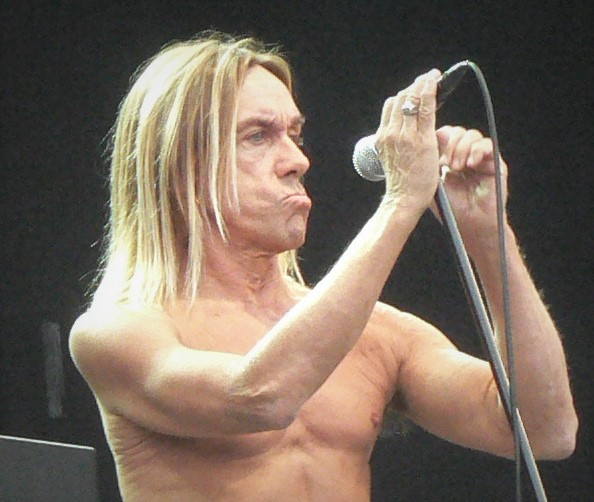
Iggy Pop in 2006

As an actor Pop has appeared in a number of movies including children's movies. Movie appearances include: Sid and Nancy (a non-speaking cameo role), The Color of Money, Hardware (voice only), The Crow: City of Angels (Iggy wanted to play Funboy in the original The Crow movie, but his recording schedule would not permit him.), The Rugrats Movie, Snow Day, Coffee and Cigarettes (opposite Tom Waits, in the third segment of the film, "Somewhere in California"), Tank Girl and Atolladero, a Spanish science fiction Western. Pop worked with Johnny Depp on several films: they appeared together in Cry-Baby and Dead Man.

Pop has also appeared in many television series, including Tales from the Crypt, The Adventures of Pete & Pete, where he played Nona's dad in the second and third season, and Star Trek: Deep Space Nine, in which he played Yelgrun in the episode "The Magnificent Ferengi". With the Stooges, he was featured in an episode of MTV's Bam's Unholy Union as the main band performing at Bam Margera's wedding. Additionally, a portion of the music video for Pop's "Butt Town" was featured on an episode of Beavis and Butt-Head. Pop also voiced a cameo in the American Dad! episode "American Dream Factory" as Jerry, the drummer, in Steve Smith's band. Pop played himself as the DJ of the fictional rock station Liberty Rock Radio 97. 8 in the video game Grand Theft Auto IV. The Stooges song "I Wanna Be Your Dog" was featured on the same station. Pop appears as a character in the Adult Swim animated comedy-adventure series The Venture Bros.. He is one of the bodyguards, along with Klaus Nomi, of David Bowie, who is "The Sovereign" of the Guild of Calamitous Intent. Pop has some unclear super-powers, which he uses when he and Nomi turn against Bowie.

Pop has been profiled in several rockumentaries and has had songs on many soundtracks, including Crocodile Dundee II; Trainspotting; Lock, Stock and Two Smoking Barrels; Haggard; Repo Man; Black Rain; Freddy's Dead: The Final Nightmare; Shocker; and Kurt Cobain: About a Son.

Pop hosts a weekly radio show and podcast titled "Iggy Confidential" on BBC Radio 6 Music. In it he covers an eclectic range of music from punk to jazz, and champions new artists such as Shame, Fat White Family, False Heads, and Sleaford Mods. He also championed Mik Artistik, whose song "Sweet Leaf of the North" was named by Iggy as one of his favorite songs of the 2010s.

1993:

- Pop provided the soundtrack for The Brave, which was directed by and starred Depp, and music for Depp's film Arizona Dream.

2000:

- Pop played a DJ at an ice rink for the comedy Snow Day.

2004:

- Pop also featured as a voice talent in the Atari video game DRIV3R (as Baccus and other characters), which was produced by Reflections Interactive.

2007:

- Pop voiced Lil' Rummy on the Comedy Central show Lil' Bush, and also provided the voice for a character in the English-language version of the animated film Persepolis.

2008:

- He makes an appearance in FLicKeR, a feature documentary by Nik Sheehan about Brion Gysin and the Dreamachine.

2009:

- February - Iggy played the character Victor in the movie Suck.

2010:

- April - Pop was featured alongside indie starlet Greta Gerwig in the film Art House, which premiered at the Nashville Film Festival.

2012:

- Pop played the conscience of a clown named Elliot (Denis Lavant) in the French film L'Étoile du jour (Morning Star) directed by Sophie Blondy.

2013:

- Pop appeared briefly in the French film Les gamins then he voiced The Caterpillar in the television series Once Upon a Time in Wonderland.

2014:

- Pop presented (narrated) the BBC documentary Burroughs at 100. William Burroughs profoundly affected Pop's writing, inspiring lyrics in the famous "Lust for Life".
- Pop voiced the character Texas Red on the Adult Swim animated comedy Mr. Pickles, which ran from 2014 to 2019.
- Based on Kai Grehn's German translation of Walt Whitman's poetry cycle in 2005, a radio drama and bilingual double-CD audio book "Kinder Adams/Children of Adam" was released by Hörbuch Hamburg in 2014, including a complete reading by Pop.

2015:

- It was aired in the US on This American Life on January 30, 2015, in the episode "Burroughs 101", commemorating his 101st birthday.
- In 2015, Pop had a starring role as Vicious in the Björn Tagemose-directed silent film Gutterdämmerung opposite Grace Jones, Henry Rollins and Lemmy.
- Pop also featured in the Rammstein documentary Rammstein in Amerika that same year.
- In May, Pop appeared as himself in an episode of Anthony Bourdain: Parts Unknown.

2016:

- In 2016, Pop was featured as a main subject in the documentary Danny Says starring alongside Danny Fields, Alice Cooper, Judy Collins, Wayne Kramer, Jac Holzman and more.
- In the same year, Pop starred in Toby Tobias' thriller Blood Orange in which he plays an aging rock star.
- Also during 2016, Jim Jarmusch directed Gimme Danger, a documentary movie about the band.
- Also in 2016, he participated, with Michel Houellebecq and others, in Erik Lieshout's documentary To Stay Alive: A Method.

2017:

- On August 8, 2017, In Praise of Nothing premiered at the Locarno Film Festival which he solely voiced over its full length.
- In 2017, Pop appeared in Song to Song directed by Terrence Malick, opposite Michael Fassbender.

2019:

- In early 2019, Pop executive produced a four-part documentary series entitled PUNK for Epix.
- Pop also appears as a zombie in the 2019 Jim Jarmusch film The Dead Don't Die.

2021:

- In 2021 Pop appeared with Nico Rosberg – 2016 Formula One champion – in a video advert for the German State Railways' (Deutsche Bahn) high-speed train services. The backing music was Pop's song "The Passenger". Pop also participated in the Detroit City FC public investment fund, contributing $1,000 to the club.

== Cancelled biopic ==
The Passenger was, as of 2007, the putative name for a biographical film about Pop's early career with the Stooges. The film was to be directed by Nick Gomez and Elijah Wood was to play Pop. Pop supported the project and the casting of Wood, but refused to take part in the film. The project later was shelved.

== Classical scholarship ==
In 1995, a journal of classical scholarship, Classics Ireland, published Pop's reflections on the applicability of Edward Gibbon's Decline and Fall of the Roman Empire to the modern world in a short article, "Caesar Lives" (Vol. 2, 1995). Pop also relates how reading Gibbon while on tour in the Southern United States inspired him to a spontaneous soliloquy he called "Caesar", which was included on his 1993 album American Caesar.

== Personal life ==
Pop lives in the Coconut Grove neighborhood of Miami, Florida.

He has been married three times: to Wendy Weissberg for several weeks in 1968 before divorcing her in Cuyahoga County, Ohio, on November 25, 1969; to Suchi Asano (from 1984 until their divorce in 1999); and to his longtime partner Nina Alu, whom he married in 2008. He has a son, Eric Benson, born in 1970 from a relationship with Paulette Benson.

At age 23, Pop allegedly had a relationship with 13-year-old groupie Sable Starr. Since the emergence of the MeToo movement, he has faced criticism for his relationship with Starr. The documentary Look Away, a documentary about sexual abuse in the rock music industry, is named after an Iggy Pop song about Starr from the album Naughty Little Doggie.

Pop has scoliosis, with one leg being one-and-a-half inches shorter than the other.

In the 1990s, Pop became friends with Johnny Depp, Jim Jarmusch, and tattoo artist Jonathan Shaw. Shaw said the four wore matching rings depicting a skull, and all but Pop received a similar skull-and-crossbones tattoo.

Pop owns a Moluccan cockatoo, Biggy Pop. Pop uses the bird to promote Byron Bay Wildlife Hospital, an Australian charity. A beer named after the cockatoo, Biggy Pop Hop, raised funds in support of the charity.

== Legacy ==
Iggy Pop is considered by some to be among the greatest and most influential punk rock vocalists of all time. According to Ultimate Classic Rock: "There is perhaps no human in history who has personified punk more than Iggy Pop."

Admirers

- Music journalist Lester Bangs was one of the first writers to champion the Stooges in a national publication. His piece "Of Pop and Pies and Fun" for Creem Magazine was published about the time of the Stooges' second album Fun House. Another music journalist, Legs McNeil, was especially fond of Iggy and the Stooges and championed them in many of his writings.
- Kurt Cobain consistently listed Raw Power as his No. 1 favorite album of all time in the "Favorite Albums" lists that featured in his Journals.
- In August 1995, all three Stooges albums were included in British music magazine Mojo's influential "100 Greatest Albums of All Time" feature. Fun House was placed the highest, at 16.
- Australian band Radio Birdman took their name, although incorrectly, from the lyrics of the Stooges song "1970".
- In 2004, Rolling Stone ranked the Stooges No. 78 on their list of 100 of the most influential artists of the past 50 years.
- Layne Staley said that he was a big fan of both The Stooges and Iggy Pop.
- Slash included their self-titled debut amongst his favorite studio albums.
- Peter Hook included their live album Metallic K.O. amongst his favorite albums.
- In 2023, Rolling Stone ranked Pop at number 176 on its list of the 200 Greatest Singers of All Time.
- "Ten Percenter", a track on the eponymous debut album by Frank Black, is about Iggy Pop.

Portrayals

- In the film Velvet Goldmine, Ewan McGregor portrays Curt Wilde, a character loosely based on Pop. McGregor performs the Stooges songs "TV Eye" and "Gimme Danger" in the film.
- In the Super Mario video game series, the character Iggy Koopa was named after him.
- James O'Barr fashioned the character Funboy in The Crow after Pop.
- In the 2013 film CBGB, Pop was played by Taylor Hawkins.
- Iggy played himself as a puppet in the short film Squirrel Mountain 'Iggy to the Rescue, that also featured him performing the song "Frozen Peas", along with his touring guitarist Kevin Armstrong.
- In The Venture Bros., Iggy (voiced by Christopher McCulloch) appears alongside Klaus Nomi as one of The Sovereign's bodyguards, with The Sovereign portrayed as David Bowie.

== Discography ==
- The Idiot (1977)
- Lust for Life (1977)
- Kill City (with James Williamson) (1977)
- New Values (1979)
- Soldier (1980)
- Party (1981)
- Zombie Birdhouse (1982)
- Blah-Blah-Blah (1986)
- Instinct (1988)
- Brick by Brick (1990)
- American Caesar (1993)
- Naughty Little Doggie (1996)
- Avenue B (1999)
- Beat 'Em Up (2001)
- Skull Ring (2003)
- Préliminaires (2009)
- Après (2012)
- Post Pop Depression (2016)
- Free (2019)
- Every Loser (2023)

== Filmography ==
Year	Title	Role
1992	Hardware	Angry Bob
1995	Tank Girl	Rat Face
1995	Dead Man	Salvatore "Sally" Jenko
1996	The Crow: City of Angels	Curve
2003	Coffee and Cigarettes	Self
2009	Suck	Victor
2010	Arthur 3: The War of the Two Worlds	Darkos
2013	Les gamins	self
2016	Blood Orange	Bill
2019	The Dead Don't Die	Zombie

== Awards and nominations ==
Year	Awards	Work	Category	Result	Ref.
1977	Creem Magazine Awards	Lust for Life	Top Album – No. 24	Nominated	
1977	Creem Magazine Awards	Raw Power	Best Reissue – No. 5	Nominated	
1977	Creem Magazine Awards	Himself	Best New Wave Group/Performer – No. 3	Nominated	
1977	Creem Magazine Awards	Himself	Punk of the Year – No. 2	Nominated	
1977	Creem Magazine Awards	Himself	Comeback of the Year – No. 1	Won	
1980	Creem Magazine Awards	Himself	Punk of the Year – No. 1	Won	
1987	Pollstar Concert Industry Awards	Tour	Small Hall Tour of the Year	Nominated	
1988	Pollstar Concert Industry Awards	Tour	Club Tour of the Year	Nominated	
1989	Pollstar Concert Industry Awards	Tour	Small Hall Tour of the Year	Nominated	
1989	Grammy Awards	"Cold Metal"	Best Hard Rock/Metal Performance	Nominated	
1992	Razzie Awards	"Why Was I Born (Freddy's Dead)"	Worst Original Song	Nominated	
1997	MTV Video Music Awards	"Lust for Life"	Best Video from a Film	Nominated	
1997	Firecracker Alternative Book Award	I Need More	Music	Won	
2001	Kerrang! Awards	Himself	Hall of Fame	Won	
2004	D&AD Awards	"Kick It" (with Peaches)	Direction	Wood Pencil	
2009	Classic Rock Roll of Honour Awards	Himself	Living Legend	Won	
2010	D&AD Awards	Together Incredible (with Orcon)	Integrated	Wood Pencil	
2014	GQ Men of the Year Awards	Himself	Icon Award	Won	
2016	Critics' Choice Documentary Awards	Gimme Danger	Most Compelling Living Subject of a Documentary	Won	
2016	Classic Rock Roll of Honour Awards	"Gardenia"	Song of the Year	Nominated	
2016	Classic Rock Roll of Honour Awards	Post Pop Depression	Album of the Year	Nominated	
2016	Classic Rock Roll of Honour Awards	Post Pop Depression: Live at the Royal Albert Hall	Best New Live Album or Video	Nominated	
2017	Classic Rock Roll of Honour Awards	Post Pop Depression: Live at the Royal Albert Hall	Best New Live Album or Video	Nominated	
2017	Grammy Awards	Post Pop Depression	Best Alternative Music Album	Nominated	
2017	Golden Globe Awards	"Gold" (with Danger Mouse)	Best Original Song	Nominated	
2017	A2IM Libera Awards	Himself	Best Live Act	Nominated	
2017	New Music Awards	Himself	College Artist of the Year	Nominated	
2017	Q Awards	"American Valhalla" (with Josh Homme)	Best Video	Nominated	
2018	Q Awards	"Bells & Circles" (with Underworld)	Best Video	Won	
2019	Sweden GAFFA Awards	Teatime Dub Encounters (with Underworld)	Best International Album	Nominated	
2019	GQ Men of the Year Awards	Himself	Lifetime Achievement Award	Won	
2020	Grammy Awards	Himself	Grammy Lifetime Achievement Award	Won	
2020	Denmark GAFFA Awards	Himself	Best Foreign Solo Act	Nominated	
2020	Denmark GAFFA Awards	Free	Best Foreign Album	Nominated	
2020	Hungarian Music Awards	Free	International Alternative Music Album of the Year	Nominated	
2020	NME Awards	Himself	Best Live Act	Nominated	

== Honors ==
In 2017, shortly after his 70th birthday, Pop was made a Commander of the Ordre des Arts et des Lettres by the French Consul general in Miami on behalf of the French government.

A photo of Pop on stage with fans at the Sydney Opera House in 2019 taken by Antoine Veling won the Culture Category of the Sony World Photography Awards.

Pop received the Polar Music Prize on May 25, 2022.
