= The Trap Set =

Music podcast

'The Trap Set'
- Genre: Talk, Music podcast
- Language: English

Cast and voices
- Hosted by: Joe Wong

Production
- Production: Chris Karwowski
- Length: 30 minutes

Publication
- No. of episodes: 289 (as of August 12, 2020)
- Original release: January 28, 2015

Related
- Website: The Trap Set

The Trap Set is a weekly podcast and terrestrial radio show about the lives of drummers. Although the craft of drumming is discussed, it is a springboard for larger discussions about life. The show features a diverse roster of guests across genres, generations, and backgrounds. Because of the emphasis on human-interest stories, music fans and non-music-fans alike enjoy the show. As of the 200th episode the scope of the show has grown to include non-drummers.

The Trap Set host, Joe Wong, is a Los Angeles based composer and drummer. He has played with artists such as Marnie Stern, Parts & Labor, and Mary Timony. He has also scored projects such as the Sundance-award-winning film The Pool and Adult Swim's Superjail!. Along with his composing partner, Didier Leplae, he is currently scoring Aziz Ansari's television series, Master of None.

The Trap Set co-producer, Chris Karwowski is a writer/producer who has worked at The Onion, AdultSwim.com and WordGirl. He ran The Onion Radio News for five years and created, produced, and edited podcasts for The A.V. Club, Thing X.com and AdultSwim.com.

Past episodes have featured guests such as Fred Armisen (SNL, Portlandia), Brendan Canty (Fugazi), Billy Cobham (Mahavishnu Orchestra, Miles Davis), Phil Collins, Stewart Copeland (The Police), Victor DeLorenzo (Violent Femmes), Sheila E. (Prince), Sam Fogarino (Interpol), Dave Lombardo (Slayer), Dee Plakas (L7), Bernard Purdie (The 3B's), Jeff "Tain" Watts (Alice Coltrane, Wynton Marsalis), and Reggie Watts (Comedy Bang! Bang!, The Late Late Show).

== See also ==
- Music podcast
