= Superjail! season 1 =

Superjail!
- Season 1
- DVD cover
- No. of episodes: 11

Release
- Original network: Adult Swim
- Original release: May 13, 2007 – December 7, 2008

Season chronology
- Next → Season 2

The first season of the American animated television series Superjail!, created by Christy Karacas, Stephen Warbrick, and Ben Gruber, originally aired on Adult Swim in the United States. The season premiered on May 13, 2007, and ended on December 7, 2008.

The first season was the only season of the show to be produced by Augenblick Studios.

== Cast ==
=== Main cast ===
- David Wain as the Warden
- Teddy Cohn as Jared
- Christy Karacas as Alice
- Christopher McCulloch as various characters
- Christy Karacas as Jacknife

=== Recurring characters ===
==== Also starring ====
- Richard Mather as the Twins (7 episodes)
- Stephen Warbrick as Jean Baptiste Le Ghei (6 episodes)

==== Guest starring ====
- Sally Donovan as the Mistress (1 episode)
- Tim Harrington as live-action Warden (1 episode)

== Episodes ==
No. overall	No. in season	Title	Directed by	Written by	Original release date	Prod. code	US viewers (millions)
1	1	"Superbar"	Christy Karacas	Christy Karacas, Stephen Warbrick, Aaron Augenblick, Chris Burns, & M. Wartella	September 28, 2008 (Note: An unfinished version of the first episode in season one, "Superbar", aired on April 1, 2008 as part of a series of sneak peeks of upcoming premieres as part of Adult Swim's annual April Fools' Day joke on its audience. The episode made its official debut on September 28, 2008)	101	N/A
Wanting to ask Alice on a date, the Warden builds a bar inside Superjail. But things go wrong when the inmates plan an escape and Jared gets drunk.
2	2	"Combaticus"	Christy Karacas	Christy Karacas, Stephen Warbrick, Aaron Augenblick, Chris Burns, & M. Wartella	October 5, 2008	102	0.33
The Warden and his workers dig up an ancient fighting arena. But the Twins use their own fighting machine for combat.
3	3	"Ladies Night"	Christy Karacas	Christy Karacas, Stephen Warbrick, Aaron Augenblick, Chris Burns, & M. Wartella	October 12, 2008	104	0.76
A women's prison ship crashes into Superjail, which inhabits the crew and inmates of Ultraprison. The Warden challenges the Mistress of Ultraprison to a bet to see whose inmates have the most class.
4	4	"Cold-Blooded"	Christy Karacas	Christy Karacas, Stephen Warbrick, & Christopher McCulloch	October 19, 2008	110	0.53
Jailbot mistakenly brings a psychotic murderer to Superjail and looking to learn about him, the Warden sends Jared undercover. But the murderer ends up killing himself by accident and the other inmates think Jared killed him, resulting in Jared becoming their leader. The Twins hack into Jailbot's system.
5	5	"Don't Be a Negaton"	Christy Karacas	Christy Karacas, Stephen Warbrick, Aaron Augenblick, Chris Burns, & M. Wartella	October 26, 2008	105	N/A
The Warden invites a motivational speaker to lecture at Superjail, but Jared notices he's not what he seems.
6	6	"Terrorarium"	Christy Karacas	Christy Karacas, Stephen Warbrick, Aaron Augenblick, Chris Burns, & M. Wartella	November 2, 2008	106	0.63
The Warden promotes a science fair at Superjail. And Jared is neglected by his co-workers.
7	7	"Mr. Grumpy-Pants"	Christy Karacas	Christy Karacas, Stephen Warbrick, Aaron Augenblick, Chris Burns, M. Wartella, & Ben Gruber	November 9, 2008	107	0.58
After capturing Jacknife once again, Jailbot mistakenly brings a dying girl into Superjail, and the inmates (as well as Alice) adore her. On his birthday, The Warden's inner child escapes.
8	8	"Dream Machine"	Christy Karacas	Christy Karacas, Stephen Warbrick, Aaron Augenblick, Chris Burns, & M. Wartella	November 23, 2008	103	0.66
The Warden records the inmates' dreams in an attempt to shut down a riot. But he goes mad with power and everyone must stop him.
9	9	"Time-Police" (Parts 1 and 2)	Christy Karacas	Christy Karacas, Stephen Warbrick, Aaron Augenblick, Chris Burns, M. Wartella, & Christopher McCulloch	November 30, 2008	108	0.60
10	10	"Time-Police" (Parts 1 and 2)	Christy Karacas	Christy Karacas, Stephen Warbrick, Aaron Augenblick, Chris Burns, M. Wartella, & Christopher McCulloch	December 7, 2008	109	0.60
The Warden proposes to turn Superjail into a franchise, only to be litigated for crimes he’s committed in the future. Meanwhile, Alice and Jared try to survive in the Warden's absence.

== Reception and release ==
=== Critical reception ===
DVD Verdict's David Johnson criticized the season in his review of the DVD release, calling it a "massive disappointment". He found the violence "grows tedious and you will be desensitized and the dearth of functional humor will hit you even harder." Ian Jane of DVD Talk gave the release four stars out of five, praising the humor and creativity, "so long as your sense of humor runs towards the more perverse side and you appreciate black comedy." He recommended the season be enjoyed "in two or three episode jolts", and that the detailed backgrounds and animation gave the season a "considerable" amount of replay value. Blogcritics's Greg Barbrick praised the release as "a must" for "anyone who enjoys truly twisted animation". He highlighted the episodes "Terrorarium" and "Time-Police" as "positively lysergic" examples of the season, but found the bleeping of profanity on the set surprising contrasted with the graphic violence.

=== Home media ===
Warner Home Video published a DVD release of the season for region 1 markets on February 23, 2010. A region 2 DVD had been released on March 12 of the same year. In promoting the release, Vice magazine held a contest with readers to submit fan art, judged by series creator Christy Karacas, with two winners receiving unopened copies of the release. The season has also been made available for digital download through the iTunes Store, with a single volume released on September 28, 2008.
