= Echo Chamber (disambiguation) =

Echo Chamber may refer to:

- Echo chamber, a type of chamber for enhanced sound reflection
- Echo chamber (media), the self/re-amplification of ideas

== Music ==
- Ace Tone Echo Chamber, a series of sound effects machines, see Ace Tone

=== Songs ===
- Echo Chamber 2000 song off the album We Are The Ark by The Ark (Swedish band)
- Echo Chamber 2011 song by Parts & Labor from the album Constant Future
- Echoless Chamber 2011 song by Vektor from the album Outer Isolation
- Echo Chamber 2017 song by Veil of Maya from the album False Idol
- Echo Chamber 2018 song by Spring King from the album A Better Life (Spring King album)
- Echo Chamber 2019 single released by Despite (band)
- Echo Chamber 2021 song by Northlane from the album Obsidian

=== Albums ===
- Echo Chamber (2014 EP) by Jaani Peuhu
- Echo Chamber (RJ Thompson album), 2017
- Echo Chamber (MC Paul Barman album), stylized as (((Echo Chamber))), 2018

== Other uses ==
- Echo Chamber, a video game expansion pack for Destiny: The Taken King
- Echo Chamber, a TV commercial for Toyota directed by Meiert Avis
- The Echo Chamber, a 2011 novel by Luke Williams
- The Echo Chamber (film), a romantic drama film

== See also ==
- Anechoic chamber, a chamber of silence
- Echo (disambiguation)
- Chamber (disambiguation)
