= Cheeseburger (album) =

Studio album by Cheeseburger
- Released: February 20, 2007
- Recorded: 2006
- Studio: Kemado Studios
- Genre: Punk rock; hard rock; comedy
- Length: 48:45
- Label: Kemado
- Producer: Cheeseburger, Tom Clapp

Cheeseburger chronology
Cheeseburger (2007)	Another Big Night Down the Drain (2011)

Cheeseburger is the debut studio album by American hard rock band Cheeseburger. It was released on February 20, 2007, under Kemado Records. The album was a follow-up to the band's 2005 EP.

== Background and recording ==
Cheeseburger released their debut EP titled Gang's All Here, on June 5, 2005. The EP consisted of band members Joe Bradley, Luke Crotty, and Christy Karacas. In 2006, they decided to work on a full-length debut album, which was ultimately titled Cheeseburger.

== Sound and influence ==
Cheeseburger is loosely influenced by sounds of garage rock, punk, and hard rock. Lyrics are not publicly available, and words in songs are sometimes incoherent. However, the lyrics for the track "Hot Streets" is available on Genius.

== Artwork ==
The artwork depicts an image of a closeup shot of a man's chest, with lightly worked up white clothing and the pants being held up by rainbow suspenders. On the back of the CD, the artwork is the behind of the man, with his intergluteal cleft partially visible. Additionally, many Cheeseburger CDs that are stumbled across online or in independent record stores are found with hole-punches on the barcode due to the production of physical versions of the CD being extremely limited.

== Reception ==
Cheeseburger was reviewed by many music critics when it was released. Exclaim! comments "If the Demolition Doll Rods were to do away with their gimmicky go-go get-ups and lack of a solid drummer, their rock n' soul atmosphere would seem unstoppable. Listening to this eponymous effort, one instantly feels that Cheeseburger have realised the same thing and applied it to their shimmying backbeat, creating devout soul rock.". Spin praised the album, stating "The key details remain in the recordings: The energy is savage, the feedback is fierce, the frontman's yelps are reckless. Past or no past, Cheeseburger has arrived to provide all the urgent gratification (and extra value) we seek.". Pitchfork states "Cheeseburger have got nothing up their sleeves, which makes the sting of their sucker punch all the more glorious. Don't try to look for it, there's no wink here to assure you this classic rock posturing is the least bit tongue-in-cheek. That said, judging this Brooklyn trio's debut by your first visceral impression may be the best way to enjoy them-- as long as you don't have a weak stomach.". They also add "It's hard to imagine anything is calculated here. These schlubs simply pluck classic rock motifs from their subconscious and get 'em drunk. For example, you could accuse "Money For the Heart" of ripping The Who's "Can't Explain" riff, but guitarist Christy Karacas butchers it, essentially co-opting the guitar hook by mutilation. Bradley is hardly any more coherent, seemingly blacking out as he garbles inebriated battle cries ("Hey, hey, the gang's all here/ What a bunch of fucking queers!") and continuously preaching the rock 'n' roll lifestyle.", giving them a 6.7/10.

== Track listing ==
All songs written by Cheeseburger.

No.	Title	Length
1.	"Let the Good Times Roll"	2:21
2.	"Money for the Heart"	2:30
3.	"Interlude #1"	0:19
4.	"Easy Street"	3:33
5.	"Hot Streets"	3:37
6.	"Derby Day"	3:28
7.	"Do You Remember?"	2:54
8.	"Tiger"	2:30
9.	"Walkin' After Midnight"	1:40
10.	"Pirate"	2:50
11.	"Melissa Brown"	4:00
12.	"Rats"	1:34
13.	"Cocaine"	1:59
14.	"Interlude #2"	0:20
15.	"Gang's All Here"	4:47
16.	"Bobby's Theme"	10:12
Total length:		48:45

Notes

- "Bobby's Theme" ends at roughly 3:37. Approximately 5 minutes of silence later, an untitled bonus track plays, which is a commercial for a place named "Rowdy P's". The bonus track is still in Bobby's Theme on Spotify.
- Interludes 1 & 2 are audio of a crowded restaurant; many words are incoherent. The only spoken words that are said over the overlapped chatter are in "Interlude #2", stating "I assume you wanna... contain it, right?".

== Personnel ==
Credits taken from the CD liner notes.

Cheeseburger

- Joe Bradley – vocals
- Luke Crotty – drums
- Christy Karacas – guitar

Production

- Tom Clapp – produced, recorded, and mixed
- Rick Essig – mastering
- Jason Rothenberg – cover art
- Per Billgren – inside shot
