= List of Superjail! episodes =

The following is a list of episodes for the animated Adult Swim television series, Superjail!, along with descriptions for each episode. The episodes are ordered chronologically by airdate for each season. There have been 37 episodes in total.

The first season of Superjail! was released on DVD in the United States on February 23, 2010, and the second season of Superjail! was also released on DVD in the United States on March 13, 2012. The third season was released on July 23, 2013.

== Series overview ==
| Season | Episodes | Originally released | |
| Season | Episodes | First released | Last released |
|---|---|---|---|
| Pilot | | May 13, 2007 | |
| 1 | 10 | September 28, 2008 | December 7, 2008 |
| 2 | 10 | April 3, 2011 | June 12, 2011 |
| 3 | 10 | September 30, 2012 | December 9, 2012 |
| 4 | 6 | June 15, 2014 | July 20, 2014 |

== Episodes ==
=== Pilot (2007) ===
| Title | Directed by | Written by | Original release date | Prod. code |
|---|---|---|---|---|
| "Bunny Love" | Christy Karacas | Christy Karacas, Stephen Warbrick, & Ben Gruber | May 13, 2007 | 000 |
In this bloody pilot, The Warden plans to dress the prisoners in bunny suits, but the Twins interfere with the purchase order. This makes half of the order wolf suits. This episode opens with "Rubber Bullets" by 10cc, while all the other episodes open with “Comin Home”, the official title for the series.

=== Season 1 (2008) ===
| No. overall | No. in season | Title | Directed by | Written by | Original release date | Prod. code | US viewers (millions) |
|---|---|---|---|---|---|---|---|
| 1 | 1 | "Superbar" | Christy Karacas | Christy Karacas, Stephen Warbrick, Aaron Augenblick, Chris Burns, & M. Wartella | September 28, 2008 (Note: An unfinished version of the first episode in season one, "Superbar", aired on April 1, 2008 as part of a series of sneak peeks of upcoming premieres as part of Adult Swim's annual April Fools' Day joke on its audience. The episode made its official debut on September 28, 2008) | 101 | N/A |
| 2 | 2 | "Combaticus" | Christy Karacas | Christy Karacas, Stephen Warbrick, Aaron Augenblick, Chris Burns, & M. Wartella | October 5, 2008 | 102 | 0.33 |
| 3 | 3 | "Ladies Night" | Christy Karacas | Christy Karacas, Stephen Warbrick, Aaron Augenblick, Chris Burns, & M. Wartella | October 12, 2008 | 104 | 0.76 |
| 4 | 4 | "Cold-Blooded" | Christy Karacas | Christy Karacas, Stephen Warbrick, & Christopher McCulloch | October 19, 2008 | 110 | 0.53 |
| 5 | 5 | "Don't Be a Negaton" | Christy Karacas | Christy Karacas, Stephen Warbrick, Aaron Augenblick, Chris Burns, & M. Wartella | October 26, 2008 | 105 | N/A |
| 6 | 6 | "Terrorarium" | Christy Karacas | Christy Karacas, Stephen Warbrick, Aaron Augenblick, Chris Burns, & M. Wartella | November 2, 2008 | 106 | 0.63 |
| 7 | 7 | "Mr. Grumpy-Pants" | Christy Karacas | Christy Karacas, Stephen Warbrick, Aaron Augenblick, Chris Burns, M. Wartella, & Ben Gruber | November 9, 2008 | 107 | 0.58 |
| 8 | 8 | "Dream Machine" | Christy Karacas | Christy Karacas, Stephen Warbrick, Aaron Augenblick, Chris Burns, & M. Wartella | November 23, 2008 | 103 | 0.66 |
| 9 | 9 | "Time-Police" (Parts 1 and 2) | Christy Karacas | Christy Karacas, Stephen Warbrick, Aaron Augenblick, Chris Burns, M. Wartella, & Christopher McCulloch | November 30, 2008 | 108 | 0.60 |
| 10 | 10 | "Time-Police" (Parts 1 and 2) | Christy Karacas | Christy Karacas, Stephen Warbrick, Aaron Augenblick, Chris Burns, M. Wartella, & Christopher McCulloch | December 7, 2008 | 109 | 0.60 |

=== Season 2 (2011) ===
| No. overall | No. in season | Title | Directed by | Written by | Original release date | Prod. code | US viewers (millions) |
|---|---|---|---|---|---|---|---|
| 11 | 1 | "Best Friends Forever" | Christy Karacas | Christy Karacas & Stephen Warbrick | April 3, 2011 | 203 | N/A |
Jailbot, while escorting Jacknife to Superjail, is shot down in hostile territory. Jared and Alice end up gambling with the inmates over who will kill the other/survive longer. Meanwhile the Warden tries to live without Jailbot, and do Jailbot's duties around the jail. In the end he goes crazy, and convinces himself he is Jailbot. This episode is the third in which Jacknife is not imprisoned in Superjail.
| 12 | 2 | "Mayhem Donor" | Christy Karacas | Joe Croson & Adam Modiano | April 10, 2011 | 202 | N/A |
A freak accident in the jail leaves Jared disfigured with the body parts of dismembered prisoners. Meanwhile, the Warden's plans to sell organs on the black market backfires when the stored organs fuse into a monster that goes on a rampage through the jail.
| 13 | 3 | "Lord Stingray Crash Party" | Christy Karacas | John Miller; Story by: Christy Karacas, Chris McCulloch & Stephen Warbrick | April 17, 2011 | 201 | N/A |
Supervillain Lord Stingray is castaway on Superjail after military forces capture his home island. The Warden sends Jailbot to retrieve him. After Meeting the Warden, Lord Stingray poses as a friend to The Warden, as he spoon feeds top secret information about the jail to Stingray. Lord Stingray commands a full on assault on Superjail. The Warden, his staff, and all the inmates are captured with ease. Meanwhile, the commander that took over Stingray's home island is hellbent on capturing him. He sends 5 special operatives to apprehend him. Alice teams up with the special ops to take down Stingray, At the same time, The Warden rallies the inmates into fighting to take back Superjail. Stingray's forces are destroyed, and he is incarcerated in Superjail.
| 14 | 4 | "Hotchick" | Christy Karacas | John Miller | April 24, 2011 | 204 | N/A |
An alien blob crash lands in the jail, the blob, using the memories of Jacknife as a template, morphs into the shape of a beautiful woman. The Warden recruits her after a guard training session ends with her being the only survivor, then he falls in love with her. The woman has a savage rage against the Twins, where they respond by lying that they are the only survivors of a mass genocide that occurred on their home planet when a tyrannical ruler took over. Whereas, in reality, they are simply there as "exchange students" refusing to go home. The woman is actually a family dog named Hunter sent by the ruler/father to bring the Twins back home.
| 15 | 5 | "Gay Wedding" | Christy Karacas | Joe Croson & Adam Modiano | May 1, 2011 | 205 | N/A |
Two inmates, Jean and Paul, decide to take their relationship to the next level and get married in the romantic halls of Superjail! When the Warden learns of the plans, he and Alice intervene, taking over the finer details of the wedding with excitement and fervor. However, things go awry when the bachelor party they planned provides Paul with an opportunity to engage in questionable relations with a male stripper. When Jean catches him in the act, he angrily throws his ring at him and declares their relationship over. The Warden is appalled at his plans being foiled, and declares that he will try to help the former lovers reignite their "spark." When Jean and Paul by chance end up in next-door bathroom stalls to take care of other business, Jean realizes Paul is next door, and they make up with each other by exchanging sweet words, renewed vows, and more through a glory hole. The Warden, Alice, and Jailbot meanwhile watch above the stalls, pronouncing Jean and Paul officially married. The newlyweds ride off in a makeshift carriage with the sentiment "Just Gaymaryed" painted on the back and enjoy their honeymoon in solitary confinement.
| 16 | 6 | "Ghosts" | Christy Karacas | John Miller & Stephen Warbrick | May 8, 2011 | 206 | 1.46 |
When Jared's photo of the Warden reveals ghosts haunting Superjail, the Warden scoffs. But after some nightmares and a poltergeist kidnapping, the Warden becomes a believer. They visit Superjail's Doctor, who temporarily kills the Warden in order to send his spirit to the "other side" so that he can determine what's going on. He meets Quetzalpocetlan (voiced by John Waters), a 1,000-year-old Aztec-like priest (nicknamed "Chet") who used to run Superjail back when it was a temple where innumerable beheadings occurred. "Chet" is stuck between worlds, bottling up the spirits. An attempt to revive the Warden unleashes thousands of ghosts in Superjail, who wreak havoc. After killing himself trying to revive the Warden, Jared ends up in the spirit realm. He loses his cool, and knocks "Chet" loose. After a brief sojourn in a Buddhist-like paradise, the Warden and Jared are revived and returned to Superjail.
| 17 | 7 | "Jailbot 2.0" | Christy Karacas | Joe Croson & Adam Modiano | May 15, 2011 | 207 | 1.48 |
When Jailbot begins to have technical problems (to that point that he busts Jacknife out of prison in the opening credits), Jared decides to replace him with a new, highly-advanced robot: Jailbot 2.0 (which bears a resemblance to an Android phone or iPod or iPhone or iPad). Jailbot is consigned to a basement room where he meets up with previous versions of jailbots. Jailbot 2.0 makes Alice and Jared superfluous, and so efficiently manages Superjail that it becomes nonviolent, antiseptic, and hyper-efficient. The Warden, however, loves Jailbot 2.0's endless diversions (like cartoons, a vibrating chair, etc.). After Jailbot, Alice, and Jared convince the Warden that Superjail has lost its pizazz, the Warden agrees that 2.0 must go. But this drives Jailbot 2.0 to attack them in anger, leading to much mayhem.
| 18 | 8 | "The Budding of the Warbuxx" | Christy Karacas | Joe Croson, Adam Modiano, & Christy Karacas | May 22, 2011 | 208 | 1.34 |
After watching a 1950s-era anti-cannabis film on Superjail movie night, the Warden attempts to crack down on the non-existent drug trade at Superjail. He soon suspects that Alice is addicted as well. Meanwhile, one of the Twins begins budding a Warbuxx, which is a process like pregnancy but involves crystals jutting from his swollen abdomen. After Warden runs off to start cracking down on Superjail's "Drug Trade", the inmates hold their own movie night. Ash fears all movies in general due to a traumatic moment in his childhood and is reluctant to go, but gay inmates Jean and Paul help him face his fears. While this is happening The Warden, Jared, and the Doctor discover some of the Warbuxx crystals on the floor. Assuming they are illegal drugs, they decide to get high to deter the inmates from using them. They begin to physically mutate (but believe this is just the effects of the drugs), run through Superjail, and scare the inmates. They send Ash into a flashback, and he burns the theater down. The three drugged individuals burst in on Alice who is acting as the "bud-steward" for the Twins, who are in the Superjail refrigerator preparing for the budding of the Warbuxx. When the Warbuxx does bud The Twins reveal that the Warbuxx is actually a delicacy, and eat it in front of a horrified Warden, Jared, and Doctor which kills their buzz. Shortly afterwards, Alice sends part of the Warbuxx to a starving adopted child in Africa to devour himself. Note: This is the first episode which does not feature Jacknife, does not include any major violence, and does not have an opening sequence in which Jailbot captures Jacknife.
| 19 | 9 | "Superjail Grand Prix" | Christy Karacas | Joe Croson & Adam Modiano | June 5, 2011 | 210 | 1.30 |
The annual Superjail Grand Prix is held, with the winner being offered their freedom from the prison. However, the Warden competes with the help of a kidnapped ringer. The Warden's team gets into a clash with Lord Stingray right at the race's end, and as the Warden and Stingray fell out of the cars, Jacknife—who was in the Warden's trunk—wins and is released.
| 20 | 10 | "Vacation" | Christy Karacas | Christy Karacas & Stephen Warbrick | June 12, 2011 | 209 | N/A |
The Warden builds a massive airship and takes the prisoners on a cruise-ship-style vacation to an archipelago of floating islands; the vacation quickly goes awry when the Warden makes poor choices—such as flying through a flock of strange beasts (clogging the engines) and angering a Poseidon-like deity. Lord Stingray leads a mutiny and lands on an island ruled by Amazons in search of treasure. After reclaiming the ship and returning home, they find the Mistress of Ultraprison waiting for them, for which she had taken control over Superjail! In the cliffhanger after the credits, Jailbot re-activates itself and goes off to find the warden and the others.

=== Season 3 (2012) ===
| No. overall | No. in season | Title | Directed by | Written by | Original release date | Prod. code | US viewers (millions) |
|---|---|---|---|---|---|---|---|
| 21 | 1 | "Stingstress" | Christy Karacas | Christy Karacas, Stephen Warbrick, & Janine DiTullio | September 30, 2012 | 302 | 1.07 |
Superjail is taken over and becomes co-ed. The Warden has to rise back to power with a little help. The episode picks up right where the previous season left off and involves Lord Stingray teaming up with the Mistress. After he mistreats her, she dumps him and he returns to his old inmate status. In order to cheer the sex-hungry Mistress up, Alice and Charice try to hook the Warden up with the Mistress, and it almost works until the Warden's childish antics repulse the Mistress. It's up to Alice to save the day by fulfilling the Mistress' sexual urges. Stingray and his gang of inmates witness the horrifying scene. In the end, the Mistress realizes she doesn't need a man to be complete, and decides to give Superjail back to the Warden and leave to start her new lifestyle as a sexually liberated hippie. Note: The opening title card for Superjail! is "Ultrajail!"
| 22 | 2 | "Superfail!" | Christy Karacas | Adam Modiano | October 7, 2012 | 303 | 1.09 |
Jared accidentally knocks the Warden out and must learn how to run Superjail himself. He then proceeds to fail miserably at the new position. He then teams up with the Doctor to rescue the Warden from the mess that he created. This episode dives deeper into the Warden's past, showing more of the abusive relationship between him and his father in flashbacks.
| 23 | 3 | "Uh-Oh, It's Magic" | Christy Karacas | Christy Karacas | October 14, 2012 | 304 | 0.93 |
The Warden runs a magic show until he has problems when his ventriloquist dummy becomes the star of their show.
| 24 | 4 | "Sticky Discharge" | Christy Karacas | Stephen Warbrick | October 21, 2012 | 301 | 1.35 |
Superjail finally must deal with their first parolee.
| 25 | 5 | "Special Needs" | Christy Karacas | Adam Modiano | October 28, 2012 | 305 | 0.90 |
The Warden completes construction on making Superjail handicap accessible.
| 26 | 6 | "The Trouble with Triples" | Christy Karacas | Adam Modiano | November 4, 2012 | 306 | 0.93 |
The Warden's new plans for Superjail are interrupted by visitors for the Twins.
| 27 | 7 | "Nightshift" | Christy Karacas | Stephen Warbrick | November 11, 2012 | 307 | 0.95 |
An inmate's final meal causes Alice to rethink her career.
| 28 | 8 | "Oedipus Mess" | Christy Karacas | Adam Modiano | November 18, 2012 | 308 | 1.403 |
A cloning experiment in Superjail causes a mass riot.
| 29 | 9 | "Planet Radio" | Christy Karacas | Christy Karacas, Stephen Warbrick & Janine DiTullio | December 2, 2012 | 309 | 1.46 |
The prisoners get caught in a fight when Lord Stingray and Gary broadcast different stations while The Warden decides to pacify the imprisoned masses with television.
| 30 | 10 | "Burn Stoolie Burn" | Christy Karacas | Ethan T. Berlin | December 9, 2012 | 310 | 1.33 |
The Warden learns a little about friendship and a lot about fire from an inmate.

=== Season 4 (2014) ===
| No. overall | No. in season | Title | Directed by | Written by | Original release date | Prod. code | US viewers (millions) |
|---|---|---|---|---|---|---|---|
| 31 | 1 | "SuperHell!" | Christy Karacas | Janine DiTullio, Christy Karacas, & Stephen Warbrick | June 15, 2014 | 401 | 1.49 |
The Warden, with the help of a disfigured inmate named Ash, continue their arson spree across Superjail. Meanwhile, Alice and Stingray get lost on a planet full of vicious monsters. Note: The opening title card for Superjail! is "SuperHell!"
| 32 | 2 | "The Last Pack" | Christy Karacas | Stephen Warbrick & Janine DiTullio | June 22, 2014 | 406 | 1.54 |
After Warden comes to his senses and puts out the fires across Superjail, he begins blaming the whole thing on cigarettes. This prompts him to ban the use of tobacco products throughout the entirety of Superjail, which leads to some inmates to go to drastic measures in order to obtain their "buzz".
| 33 | 3 | "Jean, Paul, Beefy, and Alice" | Christy Karacas | Adam Modiano | June 29, 2014 | 404 | 1.06 |
After spotting two Peacocks together during mating season while hunting Jacknife through Africa, Jailbot becomes obsessed with finding love. The Twins capitalize on this and hand Jailbot a strange alien fungus with humanoid features which he promptly falls in love with. The fungus begins giving off mold spores infecting everyone in Superjail turning them into horrendous mutated monsters with a similar appearance as to itself.
| 34 | 4 | "The Superjail Inquisitor" | Christy Karacas | Adam Modiano | July 6, 2014 | 402 | 1.41 |
While the Warden is building a new dam in Superjail several inmates start to run a tabloid newspaper called the Superjail Inquisitor. The Warden is astonished by one of the fake articles and believes that his favorite childhood monster, "Manglefang" may be lurking in Superjail. This prompts the Warden to suspend construction and go on a massive hunt for Manglefang and torturing anyone who refuses to believe in it. The Twins then discover an article made by Ash about aliens, so they modify the image in the newspaper and then send it to the Triplets in space. The Triplets arrive on Earth in response, and in a fit of rage they make every fake article ever written in the tabloid (including Manglefang, to Warden's delight) manifest in reality resulting in chaos and the arrival of the Four Horsemen of the Apocalypse to Superjail.
| 35 | 5 | "Superstorm!" | Christy Karacas | Stephen Warbrick | July 13, 2014 | 403 | 1.28 |
It's Superjail's annual Field Day, and Warden is dead-set on winning the Three-Legged Race this year. As such, he builds himself the perfect partner: A walking weather machine named "Sunshine". Using Sunshine to create weather anomalies that distracts the competitors, Warden cheats his way to victory. However in his gloating Warden breaks his remote controller for Sunshine causing it to develop its own will and abandon Warden. Sunshine promptly creates dangerous weather anomalies all over Superjail, destroying the Candyland section in the process which enrages Warden (as it's his favorite place in the prison). Meanwhile, Jared is crying over losing Sharice to The Doctor who makes multiple attempts to take his new relationship with her to third base. His plans backfire when Sharice blindly ignores his advances, leading The Doctor to create a Frankenstein-style clone of her with slutty tendencies. Which Jared finds first. In the end, Sharice and Jared reconcile while The Doctor decides to stick to using the Sharice clone he made for his libido.
| 36 | 6 | "The Superjail Six" | Christy Karacas | Christy Karacas & Adam Modiano | July 20, 2014 | 405 | 1.51 |
During a routine sewer cleaning in Superjail, Stingray discovers a long forgotten secret that Alice and Jared had kept from the Warden. Apparently there were six dangerous inmates (known as the Superjail Six) during Superjail's early years that managed to escape from prison and make it into the badlands around the jail. After Warden learned of this he shut himself in his office for days due to depression which led to Alice and Jared forcing him to forget the incident. When Stingray learns of this story from one of the older inmates, he sets out with Prison Peedee's help to drive Warden back into his depression. The plan backfires, however, and Warden falls through the sewer pipes with Stingray and Peedee in tow. While Peedee and Stingray are chained together lost in the bayou the Warden comes across some mutated hillbilly/alligators. He subsequently falls in love with a female Alligator Hillbilly with whom he fathers many babies that he neglects and mistreats, much to her chagrin. After partying with them, he angers the entire group by destroying their sacred tree. This leads to a full invasion of Superjail by the Alligator Hillbillies. After Ash ends the invasion with a massive explosion, the last member of the Superjail Six returns to the Jail. Warden promptly kills him.
