= Warbrick =

Warbrick is a surname. Notable people with the surname include:

- Alfred Warbrick (1860–1940), New Zealand rugby union player
- Arthur Warbrick (c. 1863 – 1902), New Zealand rugby union player
- Billy Warbrick (c. 1866 – 1901), New Zealand rugby union player
- Doug Warbrick (born 1942), Australian businessman
- Fred Warbrick (1869–1904), New Zealand rugby union player
- Joe Warbrick (1862–1903), New Zealand rugby union player
- Stephen Warbrick, American animator, producer, voice actor and writer
- William Warbrick (born 1998), New Zealand professional rugby league footballer
