= Cheeseburger (band) =

American hard rock band

- Origin: Brooklyn, New York, United States
- Genres: Hard rock; garage rock
- Years active: 2005–2011
- Labels: Kemado Records; Williams Street Records
- Past members: Christy Karacas; Eric Dufresne; Christian Gordy; Joe Bradley; Luke Crotty
- Website: myspace.com/cheeseburger

Cheeseburger was an American hard rock band. They are perhaps best known for their song "Comin' Home", which was used as the theme song for the Adult Swim animated television series Superjail!, which was co-created by the band's guitarist, Christy Karacas, who is also known for creating Ballmastrz: 9009.

Spin has referred to the band as "The Hives, minus the Swedish accents (and matching formalwear)".

In July 2021, a friend of the band, Jayson Green, announced that drummer Luke Crotty had died.

== Gang's All Here ==
On June 10, 2005, Cheeseburger's released the 6 song EP "Gang's All Here" on Kemado Records. The album art features Joe Bradley in a parody of Nilsson Schmilsson.

== Self-titled LP ==
Their first album, self-titled as "Cheeseburger" was released on February 20, 2007, under Kemado Records as well.

== Another Big Night Down the Drain ==
In March 2011, the band announced it would release its second album Another Big Night Down the Drain on May 3 of the same year from Williams Street Records, Adult Swim's independent music label. Original band members Bradley, Crotty and Karacas are now joined by Christian Gordy (bass) and Eric Dufresne (guitar) on the release. On April 5, 2011, Cheeseburger released the single "Winner", which appears as the second track on the album. The music video was then released on April 18, 2011. Cheeseburger also issued a gold plated 7" vinyl through the Adult Swim label, with only 1,000 pressings made. In addition to this, the vinyl, along with the deluxe single edition on Apple Music, includes the additional track "Glam". To support the album's release, Cheeseburger performed in Austin, TX at the 2011 South by Southwest festival.

It was also announced that a lot of the music from the second album would be featured all throughout the upcoming season of Superjail!.

== Other media ==
"Guitarist Christy Karacas and drummer Luke Crotty play sloppily on purpose, and frontman Joe Bradley howls about cocaine and easy girls so ferociously you want to give him a glass of water. Crass, foul and politically incorrect? That's the point."

— Rolling Stone magazine

Along with performing the theme song for Superjail!, Cheeseburger is also well known for their work on video games and movies. Their song "Cocaine" is on the Radio Broker station in the video game Grand Theft Auto IV, "Comin Home" was featured on the soundtrack of the video game Skate 3, "Winner" was used in Saints Row: The Third and their song "Derby Day" was included in the closing credits of the movie Step Brothers.

Guitarist Christy Karacas studied film and animation at the Rhode Island School of Design.

== Discography ==
- 2007: Cheeseburger
- 2011: Another Big Night Down the Drain
