= Another Big Night Down the Drain =

Another Big Night Down The Drain

Studio album by Cheeseburger
- Released: May 3, 2011
- Studio: Great City Post
- Genre: Garage rock, hard rock, comedy
- Length: 38:57
- Label: Williams Street Records
- Producer: Cheeseburger, Britt Myers

Cheeseburger chronology
Cheeseburger (2007)	Another Big Night Down The Drain (2011)

Another Big Night Down The Drain is the second studio album by American hard rock band Cheeseburger, released on May 3, 2011. It was released four years following their self-titled debut, Cheeseburger. The album was joined by new band members bassist Christian Gordy and guitarist Eric Dufresne. It is highly likely that Another Big Night Down The Drain will be Cheeseburger's last album, as they have not talked about releasing any other works.

== Background ==
After the band's 2005 debut EP, Gang's All Here, it was followed up by their self-titled debut album, Cheeseburger. After their debut, the band started working on a second album, titled Another Big Night Down The Drain; recruiting Christian Gordy and Eric Dufresne.

== Composition and lyrics ==
Another Big Night Down The Drain has been classified as hard and garage rock. Lyrics are not publicly available online (except for the tracks "Big Night" and "Winner"); however, the lyrics are fully available in the CD fold-out booklet.

== Artwork ==
The artwork depicts a hand-drawn illustration of a man committing suicide by hanging himself, with his left eye dislodged and hanging from its socket. The man also appears to have 7 fingers, which could be a sign of polydactyl, though this is highly likely an artistic mistake. The foldout booklet contains more artwork, with one drawing for each song. Drawings for songs include a hand holding up a beer with sloppy and sketched up writing spelling "Party Song", a man with sunglasses and a grown out mustache for "Winner", a tired old man with what appears to be an ash tray and alcohol for "Big Night", and so on. Members Christian Gordy and Christy Karacas art credited for the artwork in the liner notes. Along with its predecessor, many physical pressings are found with hole punches in the barcode due to production being no longer active.

== Reception ==
Another Big Night Down The Drain was well received by critics upon its release. Popmatters says "Their sophomore offering, Another Big Night Down the Drain, is a loose concept album full of late-night parties, drunkenness and (kinda-sorta) redemption. Unfortunately, setting the band's stoopid [sic] actions in a larger context has rendered them far less fun." and "the album's postscript — a drunken stumble called "Good Time Charlie", which heavily borrows its melody from Bob Seger's "Sunspot Baby" — is the most likeable moment on the record. So I'll end with a question that these pranksters would surely appreciate: Why so serious?", giving them a 5/10. Consequence praises the album, stating "The best way to experience Cheeseburger's sophomore effort, Another Big Night Down the Drain, is to turn your speakers up full throttle and just let the Brooklyn sextet take you for a ride. Beware, though, it's pretty powerful stuff. Not in the "heart moving" way, but more like in the "Hey, let's go drive through our neighbors' lawns"-sort of way. In sum, you could do some damage with it, and if nothing else, it'll likely drive your neighbors or parents nuts. No lie, when turned to maximum, this rock could rattle pictures off of your walls. It's just a rare sort of power that's impossible to ignore; sort of like driving by a car crash.", ending off the review with "Another Big Night Down the Drain is one that will turn plenty of heads in the hard rock world. It may not be a top seller commercially, but those who hear it, will certainly go see this band when they come to town, and that's gonna be one hell of a night. Just bring those tight pants.".

== Track listing ==
Written by Joe Bradley, Luke Crotty, Eric Dufresne, and Christy Karacas.

No.	Title	Length
1.	"Party Song"	3:36
2.	"Winner"	2:50
3.	"Big Night"	3:26
4.	"Tight Jeans"	2:55
5.	"Jelly Bean"	1:57
6.	"Bobby"	4:41
7.	"Deep in the Cups"	2:55
8.	"Gina"	2:50
9.	"Suzy"	3:14
10.	"Roll Like That"	4:02
11.	"Goodtime Charlie"	6:18
Total length:		38:57

=== Notes ===
- "Bobby" is a re-recorded, rock oriented version of the last track on their debut, "Bobby's Theme"; the song is named "Bobby" on streaming platforms, while it still remains as "Bobby's Theme" on the physical version.
- All songs are labeled as explicit on streaming platforms, however, only the tracks "Winner", "Suzy", and "Goodtime Charlie" contain explicit lyrics.

== Personnel ==
Credits taken from the CD liner notes.

=== Cheeseburger ===
- Joe Bradley - vocals
- Christy Karacas - guitar
- Luke Crotty - drums
- Eric Dufresne - guitar
- Christian Gordy - bass

=== Technical personnel ===
- Production and mixing - Britt Myers
- Studio - Great City Productions
- Engineering - Britt Myers, Ian Stynes
- Assisted by - Geoff Vincent, Todd Brozman, Jake Aron
- Additional engineering - Tom Clapp
- Keys on "Suzy" - Darl Miller
- Keys on "Goodtime Charlie" - Britt Myers
- Horns on "Bobby" and "Deep in the Cups" - Tom 'Bones' Malone
- Artwork - Christian Gordy, Christy Karacas
