= A Better Life =

A Better Life may refer to:

- A Better Life (film), a 2011 American drama film
- Une vie meilleure, also known by its English release title A Better Life, a 2011 French film
- A Better Life (TV series), a 2025 Chinese television series
- A Better Life (album), a 2018 album by Spring King
- A Better Life, a song by Grace VanderWaal from the album Just the Beginning
