= Shooting Spires =

Shooting Spires is an American noise pop band from Brooklyn, New York. The group is a side project of B.J. Warshaw, best known as a member of Parts & Labor.

== History ==
Warshaw began Shooting Spires as a solo project in 2007, and recorded a full-length album in between tours for Parts & Labor. The self-titled album was released late that year on Cardboard Records, which is partly owned by the members of Parts & Labor. Following the release of the album, Warshaw assembled a four-piece ensemble for touring purposes; this group toured the United States in 2008 and appeared at SXSW.

The group's sound has been likened to Guided By Voices, Brian Eno, David Bowie, and TV on the Radio, as well as to Parts & Labor.

== Members ==
- B.J. Warshaw - vocals, keyboards
- Mat Lynch - guitar
- Emily Varlas - bass
- Jeff Ottenbacher - drums

== Discography ==
- Shooting Spires (Cardboard Records, 2007)
