= Robotomy =

American animated television series

- Genre: Science fiction comedy; Dark comedy; Splatter; Comedy drama
- Created by: Michael Buckley; Joe Deasy
- Written by: Michael Buckley; Joe Deasy
- Directed by: Christy Karacas
- Creative director: Christy Karacas
- Voices of: Patton Oswalt; John Gemberling
- Composers: Joe Wong; Didier Leplae
- Country of origin: United States
- Original language: English
- No. of seasons: 1
- No. of episodes: 10

Production
- Executive producers: Charlie Miller; Brian A. Miller; Jennifer Pelphrey; Curtis Lelash; Nick Weidenfeld; Rob Swartz; Rob Sorcher; Michael Buckley; Joe Deasy
- Producer: Nisa Contreras
- Running time: 11 minutes
- Production companies: Cartoon Network Studios; World Leaders Entertainment

Original release
- Network: Cartoon Network
- Release: October 25, 2010 – January 24, 2011

Robotomy is an American animated television series created by Michael Buckley and Joe Deasy for Cartoon Network. The series ran from October 25, 2010 to January 24, 2011. The series revolves around Thrasher (Patton Oswalt) and Blastus (John Gemberling), two teenage alien robots who live in the planet Insanus. It was produced by Cartoon Network Studios and World Leaders Entertainment (best known for being the production company of The Venture Bros.), and co-executive produced and directed by Christy Karacas, creator of Superjail! and Ballmastrz: 9009. The series was the result of numerous failed pitches to the network by the creators. On January 31, 2011, the series was cancelled after one season due to low ratings.

== Plot ==
Promo image featuring all the characters, with Thrasher (left) and Blastus (right) in the foreground

Thrasher and Blastus are two teenagers who live on Insanus, a planet inhabited by barbaric alien robots who seek to kill one another for no apparent reason. Slightly less horrific than their peers, the duo seeks to make it through high school, and navigate their lives with mixed results.

Thrasher (Patton Oswalt) is a tall robot. He wishes to gain the affections of Maimy (Jessie Cantrell). Blastus (John Gemberling) is a short robot. He just wants to be popular. As with Blastus, unlike most robots on Insanus, he is mostly sensitive and non-criminal, much to the disapproval of his mother. In his quest to be cool, however, he is incredibly impulsive and overconfident in his abilities. Thrasher, though calm and reserved, often falls prey to Blastus' badly-thought out plans.

Other characters include Weenus (Michael Sinterniklaas), a nerdy green robot who is even lower on the social pyramid than the protagonists. Dreadnot (Dana Snyder) is the teacher at Harry S. Apocalypse who finds joy in torturing and invoking pain into his students. The principal, Thunderbite (also voiced by Snyder), a large skull-shaped robot who sometimes has a motherly side towards to the students. Megawatt (also voiced by Sinterniklaas) a golden yellow robot who is loved by most girls at the school, most of whom he blows up; to Thrasher's disdain, he is dating Maimy. Tacklebot (Roger Craig Smith), a football player-like robot who acts violent and hostile toward the protagonists.

== Production ==
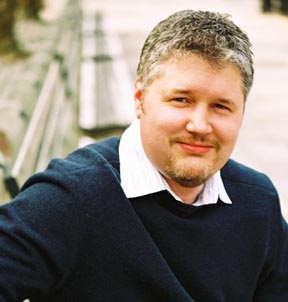
Buckley (pictured) collaborated with Deasy to pitch concepts to the network starting in 2007.

The series was created by Michael Buckley and Joe Deasy and produced by World Leaders Entertainment in New York. It was originally created with the working title Horrorbots. The network had contacted Buckley to create a series three years prior to the broadcast of Robotomy. He asked for Deasy's help, and together they pitched five ideas, to which all were rejected. Six months later, a second wave of ideas proved equally unsuccessful. Reaching their third trial, also six months later, the two pinpointed the rejections on them thinking within the network's mindset as opposed to their own. Frustrated with the project, they submitted a rough premise of Robotomy, which was accepted, much to their surprise. Buckley described the plot as when "Superbad meets the Transformers meets WWE."

According to the crew, the style of animation required a distinct set of skills, compared to another production by World Leaders, The Venture Bros. While that series was animated by the same team that did Batman: The Animated Series, Robotomy was done by the Chowder production team. In an interview, it was said that the style of the former team follows "perspective, anatomy, and real-world physics in animation", while the latter team laid its focus on "the humor of the movement and timing, squash and stretch," among other principles. Co-executive producer Christy Karacas's unique art style also proved laborious for them in that it provided "very clean polished lines" over more organic drawings. Karacas stated that the look and feel lent itself to science fiction, robotics as a whole and rock and roll. For its fictional universe, the planet of Insanus (originally called Killglobe), the production crew thought of it in unending chaos. This made way for weaponry covering the ground, a constant state of duskiness and the scarring of the land. Karacas particularly enjoyed designing and diversifying the robots in regard to their size and shape. The series was animated by the Taiwanese studio Hong Ying Animation.

The show's color scheme has been described by Karacas as a major part of the visuals; inspirations included Paul Klee and Katsuhiro Otomo, as well as the concept of fluorescence. The team wanted to create "a bold, fresh look" that reflected the universe, and so they chose to be minimal with their palette to attract attention to the linework. In addition, they eschewed the use of vivid primary colors and instead chose more secondary colors. However, they took to accentuate the scenes with "pop colors" that mimic the glow of neon lighting, and lastly, they added vertical reflections to the floors and grunge textures to the backgrounds.

== Broadcast and reception ==
Robotomy premiered on October 25, 2010 on Cartoon Network, following a new episode of Mad. A crew member from World Leaders established that the network was doing more to blend its Adult Swim brand with its primary youth demographic. The series was ultimately targeted for an older demographic than other series on the network, although it still had to be appropriate to the "broad age range." The debut broadcast was seen by 1.7 million viewers in the United States, acquiring a 0.2 Nielsen rating for adults aged 18 to 49. The season received an average of 1.5 million viewers, also with a Nielsen rating of 0.2. After ten episodes, the series concluded on January 24, 2011, making it the shortest run of any original series (but also of any series, until it was surpassed by Elliott from Earth on April 9, 2021) on the network.

Renn Brown of Cinematic Happenings Under Development noted Oswalt, a high-profile actor, as contradictory to the show's short-lived run. Will Wade of Common Sense Media gave the series a lukewarm review, finding it suitable for older teens while calling it appealing to those who struggled to gain popularity in high school. Wade called the storylines "pretty thin" and its focus on "the imagery that sells the metaphor of school as a battlefield". Aaron Simpson of Lineboil called the storylines "irreverent" and the chaos similar to Superjail!, "minus the dismembered bodies". The series was eventually added to Netflix in 2013 after the service announced a deal with Warner Bros. to include programming from Cartoon Network series, among other shows.

== Episodes ==
No.	Title	Original release date	Prod. code	US viewers (millions)
1	"Frenemy"	October 25, 2010	106	1.738
High schooler robots Thrasher and Blastus attempt to get friends on the social networking site "Frenemy", which leads to disastrous results when the site befriends them. Guest star: Jack McBrayer as Frenemy
2	"Bling Thing"	November 1, 2010	101	1.514
Jealous of Megawatt's upgrades and all the girls throwing themselves at him over them, Thrasher and Blastus try to earn money to get upgrades of their own by getting a job at The Maul (an arena where robots get eaten and digested by a monster), but when that does not work, they try selling their coolant for easy cash.
3	"No Child Left Benign"	November 8, 2010	102	1.603
Thrasher and Blastus feign being non-violent to join the Sunshine Group (a group of robots with faulty psycho-chips who act and are treated like mentally-challenged children) in order to avoid taking an upcoming standardized test, but soon discover that the Sunshine class is really a plot to get rid of non-violent robots. Guest star: Kate McKinnon as Mrs. Crunshine
4	"The Playdate"	November 15, 2010	105	1.574
Thrasher inadvertently agrees to babysit Maimy's younger brother when he tries to impress her, and he and Blastus accidentally start a war in the process. Meanwhile, Weenus is chosen to be a part of Harry S. Apocalypse High's fireworks show. Guest star: Gilbert Gottfried as the Tickle Me Psycho dolls
5	"El Presidente"	November 22, 2010	107	1.283
After staging a violent coup, Thrasher becomes school president and his friendship with Blastus becomes strained when Maimy begins falling for Thrasher.
6	"Field of Screams"	November 29, 2010	109	1.456
Thrasher and Blastus drink a strange performance-enhancing tonic given to them by the janitor in order to become great Mutilationball players, and end up getting sent to a planet of angry blue ball creatures.
7	"Mean Green"	January 3, 2011	110	N/A
On a field trip to a forest to chop down evil trees, Thrasher befriends a talking plant who is after a highly-guarded fertilizer called SuperFudge. :Guest stars: Lewis Black as The Gore-Ax/The Scrap Metal Spirit of Insanus and Lisa Lampanelli as The Green Spirit of Insanus
8	"The Trials of Robocles"	January 10, 2011	108	1.259
Thrasher and Blastus start going through puberty and must journey to Jockstrap Island and pass the Trial of Robocles in order to become men. Guest star: Lil Jon as Chief Suckerpunch
9	"Nana's Run"	January 17, 2011	103	N/A
Thrasher and Blastus join a group that Maimy starts dedicated to hurling elderly robots at other planets to keep them from going nuclear on Insanus, but when one of the elderly robots turns out to be Thrasher's grandmother, Thrasher must choose between letting her go or keeping her. Guest star: Kate McKinnon as Thrasher's grandmother
10	"From Wretchneya with Love"	January 24, 2011	104	1.264
Blastus dates and nearly marries a sexy model from the planet Wretchnya, only for Thrasher to find out she is a pirate. Meanwhile, Megawatt and his parents wander the streets after believing that they are ghosts.

== In other media ==
Blastus makes a cameo in the OK K.O.! Let's Be Heroes episode "Crossover Nexus".
