= Sarah Lipstate =

American musician (born 1984)

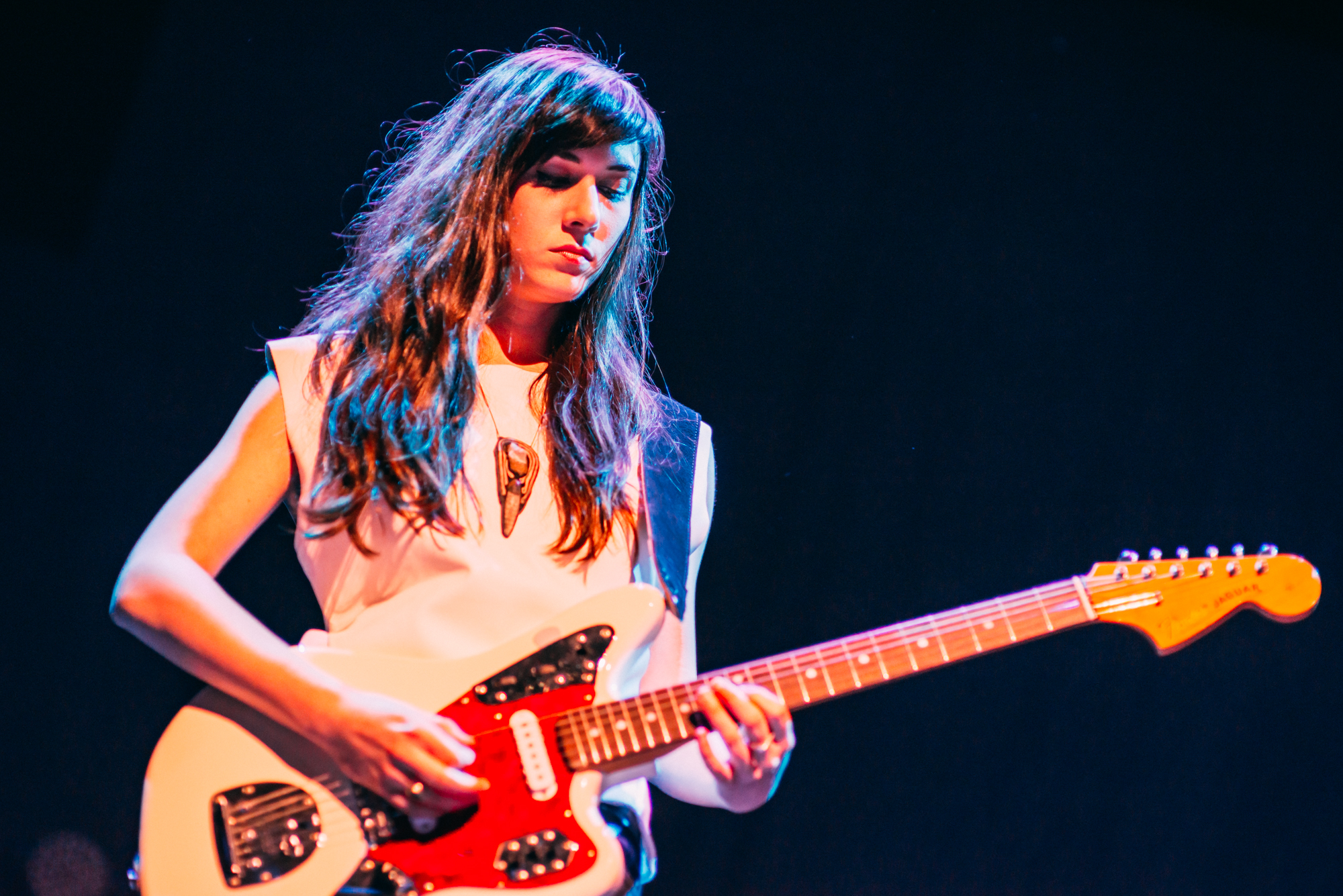
- Lipstate in 2014
- Born: 1984 (age 41–42); Birmingham, Alabama, U.S.
- Education: University of Texas at Austin
- Occupation: Musician
- Musical career
- Also known as: Noveller
- Genres: Ambient; Drone
- Instrument: Guitar
- Years active: 2007–present
- Labels: Ba Da Bing!, Divorce, Fire, Important, No Fun, Saffron, Shelter Press

Sarah Lipstate (born Birmingham, Alabama, March 16, 1984) is an American guitarist and composer who records under the name Noveller.

Her style typically involves creating layered soundscapes on the guitar, making extensive use of effects pedals and e-bows. Her music has been described as "icy drones and beautifully spare sounds" by the Allmusic reviewer.

In 2019, she collaborated with Iggy Pop on his album Free.

== Biography ==
Lipstate was born in 1984 in Birmingham. At age 2, she moved with her family to Lafayette, Louisiana.

As a child, she played piano for nearly a decade and played trombone in her high school marching band.

She began playing the guitar at 17 after buying the cheapest electric guitar she could afford.

She attended the University of Texas and studied in the school's radio-television-film program. Many in her family are UT alums.

In 2007, Lipstate moved to Brooklyn. A few months later, a mutual friend from Austin introduced her to the members of Parts & Labor who were looking for a guitarist.

== Discography ==
As Noveller

- Paint On The Shadows (No Fun Productions, 2009)
- Red Rainbows (No Fun Productions, 2009)
- Desert Fires (Saffron Recordings, 2010)
- Glacial Glow (Saffron Recordings, 2011)
- Artifact (Saffron Recordings, 2012)
- No Dreams (Important Records, 2013)
- Fantastic Planet (Fire Records, 2015)
- A Pink Sunset For No One (Fire Records, 2017)
- Arrow (Ba Da Bing Records, 2020)
- Aphantasia (Self-released, 2021)
- I Am The Weather (Experimentia, 2026)
