= Spring King =

British rock band

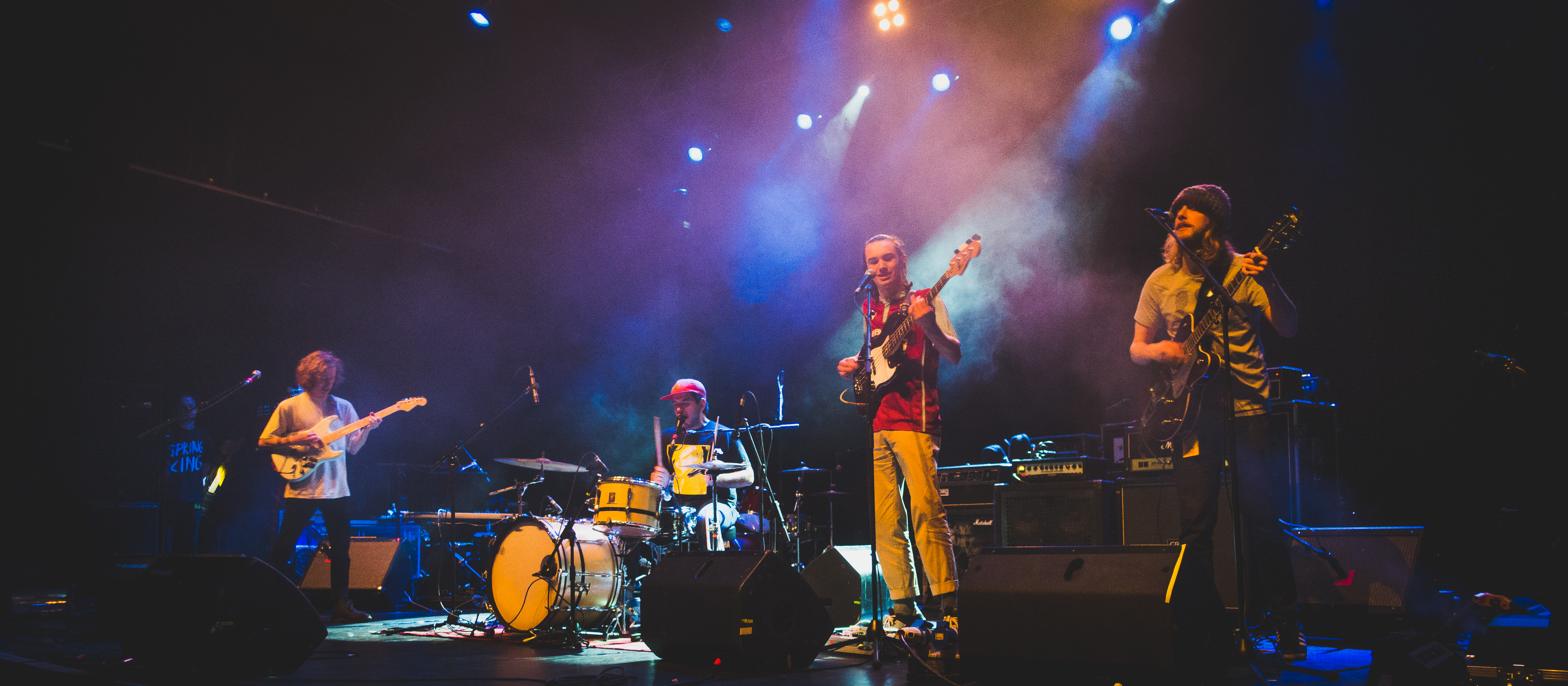

Background information
- Origin: Macclesfield, England, UK
- Genres: Garage rock, indie rock, pop punk
- Years active: 2012–2018
- Label: Island Records
- Members: Tarek Musa; Pete Darlington; Andy Morton; James Green
- Website: www.springkingband.com

Spring King were a four-piece English garage rock band from Macclesfield, who played at SXSW in 2015. They are "a small-scale, art-pop-punk project based in Manchester". They began as a solo project in 2012 of songwriter and producer Tarek Musa, who also sings and plays drums.

Notably, their track "City" was the first song played on Beats 1 by Zane Lowe.

Two of their songs, "City" and "Tell Me If You Like To" were featured on the soundtrack of the 2017 racing sim Gran Turismo Sport, with the former also being featured in Asphalt Legends Unite.

"Who Are You?" is on the soundtrack of the 2016 football game FIFA 17.

Spring King was the supporting act for the Kaiser Chiefs, 'Stay Together Tour' (February - March 2017). They also supported Kasabian at the Victoria Theatre, Halifax and the Royal Albert Hall.

Spring King disbanded in November 2018.

Frontman Tarek Musa began a solo project in 2019 under the name Dead Nature, releasing his first EP on 26 July of the same year. Guitarist Pete Darlington and bass player James Green have continued to work together, their band Meadow Meadow released its debut self-titled EP on 19 August 2020.

== Discography ==
=== Albums ===
- Tell Me If You Like To (10 June 2016) – UK No. 71
- A Better Life (31 August 2018)

=== Extended plays ===
- Demons (8 September 2014)
- They're Coming After You (20 April 2015)

=== Singles ===
- "Mumma" (3 March 2014)
- "Who Are You?" (28 October 2015)
- "Rectifier" (17 February 2016)
- "The Summer" (28 April 2016)
- "Detroit" (16 May 2016)
- "Animal" (2 May 2018)
- "Us Vs. Them" (31 May 2018)
- "The Hum" (17 July 2018)
