= Receivers (album) =

Fourth full-length album from Parts & Labor

Studio album by Parts & Labor
- Released: October 21, 2008
- Genre: Noise rock
- Label: Jagjaguwar

Parts & Labor chronology
Mapmaker (2007)	Receivers (2008)	Constant Future (2011)

Receivers is the fourth full-length release from Parts & Labor, released in 2008 on Jagjaguwar Records.

== Track listing ==
1. "Satellites"
2. "Nowheres Nigh"
3. "Mount Misery"
4. "Little Ones"
5. "The Ceasing Now"
6. "Wedding In A Wasteland"
7. "Prefix Free"
8. "Solemn Show World"

== Reception ==
- Pitchfork (8.1/10) 22 October 2008
