= Mapmaker (album) =

Studio album by Parts & Labor
- Released: May 22, 2007
- Recorded: September 2006
- Genre: Noise rock
- Labels: Jagjaguwar, Brah Records

Parts & Labor chronology
Stay Afraid (2006)	Mapmaker (2007)	Receivers (2008)

Mapmaker is the third album from Parts & Labor, released in 2007 on Jagjaguwar Records.

Professional ratings
Review scores
Source	Rating
AllMusic	3.5/5 stars
Drowned in Sound	8/10
Pitchfork	7.5/10
PopMatters	7/10

== Track listing ==
1. "Fractured Skies"
2. "Brighter Days"
3. "Vision of Repair"
4. "The Gold We're Digging"
5. "New Crimes"
6. "Long Way Down"
7. "Ghosts Will Burn"
8. "Unexplosions"
9. "Camera Shy"
10. "King of the Hill" (Minutemen cover)
11. "Fake Rain"
12. "Knives and Pencils"
