= Superjail! =

American adult animated television series

- Genre: Adult animation; Black comedy; Dystopia; Surreal humour; Splatstick
- Created by: Christy Karacas; Stephen Warbrick; Ben Gruber
- Directed by: Christy Karacas
- Voices of: David Wain; Teddy Cohn; Chris McCulloch; Richard Mather; Christy Karacas
- Music by: Bradford Reed (season 1); Didier Leplae (season 2-4); Joe Wong (season 2-4)
- Opening theme: "Comin' Home" (written and performed by Cheeseburger featuring Doc)
- Country of origin: United States
- Original language: English
- No. of seasons: 4
- No. of episodes: 36 (and 1 pilot) (list of episodes)

Production
- Executive producers: Christy Karacas; Stephen Warbrick; Ben Gruber; Aaron Augenblick (season 1); Chris Prynoski (season 2-4); Shannon Prynoski (season 2-4); Keith Crofford; Nick Weidenfeld (season 1-2); Mike Lazzo (season 3-4)
- Producers: Ollie Green (season 1, 3); David McGrath (season 2); Shannon Prynoski (season 2); PeeDee Shindell (season 3-4)
- Editors: Felipe Salazar (season 2); Stephen Warbrick
- Running time: 11 minutes
- Production companies: Augenblick Studios (2007–08); Titmouse, Inc. (2011–14); Williams Street

Original release
- Network: Adult Swim
- Release: September 28, 2008 – July 20, 2014

Superjail! is an American adult animated television series created by Christy Karacas, Stephen Warbrick and Ben Gruber for Cartoon Network's late night programming block, Adult Swim. It follows the events that take place in an unusual prison. The pilot episode aired on May 13, 2007, and its first season began on September 28, 2008.

Superjail! is characterized by its psychedelic shifts in setting and plot and extreme graphic violence, which give the series a TV-MA-V rating (for graphic violence, including scenes of bloodshed, dismemberment, torture, and cruelty). These elements are depicted through highly elaborate animated sequences, which have been described as "baroque and complicated and hard to take in at a single viewing".

== Setting and premise ==
The majority of Superjail! is set inside the eponymous prison, located in an alternate dimension identified as "5612". The prison is overseen by an individual known as "The Warden", the amiable yet sadistic and mischievous head of Superjail with apparent shapeshifting powers who uses the prison (and prisoners) to satisfy his numerous whims. Externally, Superjail is built underneath a volcano which is itself located inside of a larger volcano. Internally, it seems to constitute its own reality where the fabric of time and space is fluid and changes at the whim of the Warden. It has been indicated that the prison itself has a degree of sentience and the nature of the prison is fluid according to the perceptions of the individual. Superjail's inmate population is estimated by Jared, the Warden's primary assistant, to be in excess of 70,000, though the show's creators mention that the prison processes "billions of inmates".

In the first season, each episode begins with a linear story revolving around an irresponsible scheme concocted by the Warden to satisfy some personal desire. The episode builds in both violence and surrealism into a climactic psychedelic bloodbath during which numerous inmates are brutally and gruesomely murdered either by one another or an external force. Some episode plots have no resolutions at all, with the story simply stopping when events have reached their most chaotic point. However, the status quo is always restored by the next episode, unless the episode has multiple parts.

Beginning with the second season, the creators modified the format of the series to focus more on character development and story, as imagined by a revised writing staff. The second-season premiere "Best Friends Forever" demonstrated an immediate break from the first season's template, focusing the episode on Jailbot and Jacknife as opposed to the Warden, setting half of the episode outside of the prison and lacking an extended murder sequence in the climax.

The third and fourth seasons of the show attempted to meld the formats of the first two seasons, continuing a focus on character development and ongoing storylines while reviving the technique of ending each episode with a complex murder sequence.

== Characters ==
=== Main ===
- The Warden (voiced by David Wain) is the proprietor and warden of Superjail and main protagonist of the series. He is a tall, thin man clad in a purple tailcoat and top hat, gray gloves, pink cummerbund, and round yellow-tinted glasses. The Warden has been described as a "sadistic version of both the Mad Hatter from Alice in Wonderland and Willy Wonka from Charlie and the Chocolate Factory". Despite having an ever-cheerful and friendly disposition, he is actually a severely deranged and violent sociopath due to his upbringing by his cruel father. The Warden devised Superjail as a means for expressing himself and regularly endangers the inhabitants of Superjail, often intentionally, to satisfy his whims. He has very little respect for human life, and one day wishes to incarcerate all of humanity within Superjail, according to one episode depicting an alternate future where he conquers the entire world and transforms it into a single prison state. Rather than handling any actual administrative tasks, he spends most of his time lusting after Chief Guard Alice or indulging in his own bizarre fantasies. The Warden also possesses magical abilities, like the ability to shapeshift into virtually anything he can imagine, and controlling the laws of reality within Superjail. Though the Warden's name is never revealed, David Wain answered "Mark Davis" in a Reddit AMA. In an interview with FreakSugar, Karacas revealed that the Warden is romantic asexual, although he is frequently depicted expressing explicitly sexual interest in Alice.
- Jared (voiced by Teddy Cohn) is Superjail's large-headed, long-moustached, uptight/high-strung accountant and the Warden's primary assistant. Jared handles most of Superjail's administrative duties and extracurricular activities, like the Superjail Newspaper. He was first brought to Superjail as a prisoner for unknowingly working for the mafia and got his current job when he impressed the Warden with his intelligence and financial skills (an allusion to The Shawshank Redemption). He is in recovery for, according to the creators, every addiction possible: alcoholism, drug addiction, gambling, and compulsive eating.
- Alice (voiced by Christy Karacas) is Superjail's head prison guard. Alice regularly engages in sadomasochistic rituals with the prisoners (often without their consent), all the while rebuffing the Warden's advances. Originally a male guard at a normal prison, she discovered her true nature after falling in love with that prison's homosexual warden, who quickly fired her as a result of his transphobia. Alice was hired by the Warden shortly thereafter.
- Jailbot is a white, tombstone-shaped, levitating robot that the Warden created to perform tasks in and around Superjail ranging from prison guard, bounty hunter, gardener, and maintenance worker as well as being the Warden's butler and bodyguard. Within his simplistic-looking body seems to be a limitless storage space, from which he can produce a vast arsenal of deadly weaponry and tools, including numerous telescoping arms. He is mute with a dot matrix screen that displays a simple expressive face. Despite his ruthlessness, Jailbot also possesses a childlike personality, protecting the Warden from any harm and watching out for the welfare of children when going after Jackknife. Christy Karacas described him as a "red-headed stepchild...seeking approval".
- The Doctor (voiced by Christopher McCulloch) is the resident physician and mad scientist of Superjail. He regularly experiments on the inmates in gruesome ways and has a German accent, but at times says words in French. It was revealed in "Vacation" that he fought in World War II where he originally did Nazi medical experimentations and was a POW of the Allied Forces at some point. In "The Superjail Six", the Doctor uses some poison-implanted false teeth to commit suicide amidst the humanoid alligator hillbillies' attack.
- The Twins (both voiced by Richard Mather) are identical twin aliens with European-sounding accents who inhabit a laboratory underneath Superjail. They took a year abroad trip to Earth and then decided to stay, much to their father's dismay. The Twins use their alien powers—including teleportation, shrinking, and materializing various items to interfere with the Warden's plans for their amusement. Out of the Superjail staff, the Twins mostly interact with Alice who often assists them and keeps them safe.

=== Recurring ===
- Jackknife (vocal effects provided by Christy Karacas) – A low-level criminal who appears in the opening scenes at start of most episodes, committing some crime but always ends up being captured and tortured by Jailbot. He communicates only by way of grunts and shrieks. He is labelled by Jared to be Superjail's most vile inmate due to his upbringing and near lack of any form of morality. Jackknife is depicted as being short-tempered, violent, and misogynistic. He escapes often from Superjail just to be recaptured in the openings. In "Oedipus Mess", Jacknife is revealed to have sired a son with one of Ultra-Prison's inmates. Having recognized the child as his, Jacknife escaped while the Warden created 10,000 clones of Jacknife who ran amok worldwide until they were killed.
- Gary and Bird – Gary is a silent, bespectacled man based on Robert Franklin Stroud, the Birdman of Alcatraz. However, Gary is mostly a servant to Bird, a small female canary, who appears to be the unofficial "boss" of all of the prisoners in Superjail until Lord Stingray was imprisoned.
- Paul Guaye and Jean Baptiste Le Ghei (voiced by Christopher McCulloch and Stephen Warbrick) – Two homosexual inmates who appear in nearly every episode. Formerly the leaders of the rival gangs Purple Pythons and Double Rainbow in Superjail, Paul and Jean later fell in love and married. Paul is depicted as being the more feminine of the couple and is somewhat controlling of Jean.
- Ash Firin (voiced by Christopher McCulloch) is a severely burned prisoner with pyromania and pyrokinetic abilities. He was burned in a fire caused when his father dropped a cigarette in a theater.
- Fatty (voiced by Stephen Warbrick) is a bald, middle-aged, overweight inmate who has a high-pitched voice and giggly/creepy personality, with an affinity for trying to expose his genitals.
- Peedee (voiced by Dana Snyder) is a live ventriloquist's dummy possessed by Gary's vocal cords. He was originally controlled from within by Bird with Gary projecting his voice, but the dummy gained independence after Gary's severed vocal cords first possessed a rat and then the doll. He shares a rivalry with Lord Stingray, but the two occasionally work together against the Warden and the other inmates.
- Lord Stingray (voiced by Eric Bauza) is a stereotypical supervillain character, akin to Cobra Commander. After being defeated by his army-themed enemies, he crash-landed on Superjail Island and tried to take it over, but ended up getting imprisoned. He has been a thorn in the Warden's side ever since by trying to either escape or take over Superjail. He first appears in Season 2.

==== Ultra-Prison ====
The following are the staff of Ultra-Prison:

- The Mistress (voiced by Sally Donovan) is the female warden of Ultra-Prison (a women's prison). She had a brief one-night stand with the Warden while under the effects of Spanish fly. In the season 2 finale, she takes control of Superjail. She engaged in a relationship with Lord Stingray in the season 3 episode "Stingstress". After having sex with Alice, the Mistress returns Superjail to the Warden while she begins a new lifestyle as a hippie.
- Bruce (voiced by Melissa Brown in "Ladies' Night", and Chris McCulloch in "Stingstress") is the head guard at Ultraprison and part of the Mistress' staff. He is the opposite counterpart to Alice and is thus also transgender.
- Nova (voiced by Sally Donovan) – The pink robot of UltraPrison. While she appears to be the female version of Jailbot, she is also sleeker and refers to herself as a 'newer model' than he is. However, since both of them are custom built prototypes, neither of them can be newer or older.
- Charise (voiced by Kamala Sankaram in "Ladies' Night", Sally Donovan in "Vacation" and onwards) is part of the staff at Ultra-Prison, acting as both the Mistress' personal assistant and her accountant. She is the counterpart to Jared. She has a romantic long-distance relationship with Jared until the episode "Superhell", where she is led to believe that Jared had died. In her grief, she briefly enters a relationship with the Doctor, before returning back to Jared in the episode "Superstorm".

== Episodes ==
| Season | Episodes | Originally released | |
| Season | Episodes | First released | Last released |
|---|---|---|---|
| Pilot | | May 13, 2007 | |
| 1 | 10 | September 28, 2008 | December 7, 2008 |
| 2 | 10 | April 3, 2011 | June 12, 2011 |
| 3 | 10 | September 30, 2012 | December 9, 2012 |
| 4 | 6 | June 15, 2014 | July 20, 2014 |

== Development ==
The series was the creation of Christy Karacas, Stephen Warbrick, and Ben Gruber. Karacas was a member of the band Cheeseburger (who provided the show's theme song "Comin' Home" until season 4), and a background designer for MTV's Daria. Karacas went on to direct Robotomy for Cartoon Network and create the series Ballmastrz: 9009. Warbrick was originally known for his work on MTV's Beavis and Butt-Head and Daria, was a digital artist on MTV's Celebrity Deathmatch and an animatic artist at Blue Sky Studios. Gruber originally wrote for Ultracity 6060 on MTV's Cartoon Sushi, and went on to write for series such as Teen Titans Go!, Breadwinners, SpongeBob SquarePants, and Jellystone!.

Karacas originally created a student film in 1997 for MTV's Cartoon Sushi, entitled "Space War". He then partnered with Warbrick in 2001, creating another film known as "Bar Fight", which caught the attention of Cartoon Network's Adult Swim, who allowed them, and Ben Gruber, to make a show of their own.

== International broadcast ==
In Canada, Superjail previously aired on G4's Adult Digital Distraction block, and currently airs on the Canadian version of Adult Swim.

== Influences ==
In a Cold Hard Flash interview, creator Christy Karacas explained influences for the show were Gary Panter, Robert Crumb, Sally Cruikshank, Mad magazine, Vince Collins, Looney Tunes, Fleischer Studios, Tex Avery, Bob Clampett, Schoolhouse Rock!, Sesame Street, the Itchy & Scratchy segments from The Simpsons, kids' art, Muppets, outsider art, underground comics and Pee Wee's Playhouse.

== Home releases ==
| Season | | Episodes | Release date | Features |
| Season | | Episodes | Region 1 | Features |
|---|---|---|---|---|
| 1 | 2008 | 10 + Pilot | February 23, 2010 | All episodes from the first season, the music video "Comin' Home", the animatics for episodes 1,9,10, and the pilot. All featured in 2.0 Stereo and closed captioning. Dialogue remains censored in the feature episodes despite the label on the DVD stating otherwise. |
| 2 | 2011 | 10 | March 13, 2012 | Episode commentary for all episodes but 2 and 7, Cheeseburger concert footage, Cheeseburger animated music video, interview with Christy Karacas and Joe Bradley, script to film comparison of episode 10, animation tests, animatics for episodes 1, 4, 6, 8, 9, and 10, "Introstring" of the episode openings. Dialogue and footage are uncensored. |
| 3 | 2012 | 10 | July 23, 2013 | Animatics for episodes 1 and 7, animation tests of episodes 6 and 10, "Introstring" featurette. Dialogue and footage remain censored despite the DVD label stating otherwise. |

The series is also available on HBO Max since September 1, 2020.

== See also ==
- Happy Tree Friends
