= Joe Wong (musician) =

American musician (born 1980)

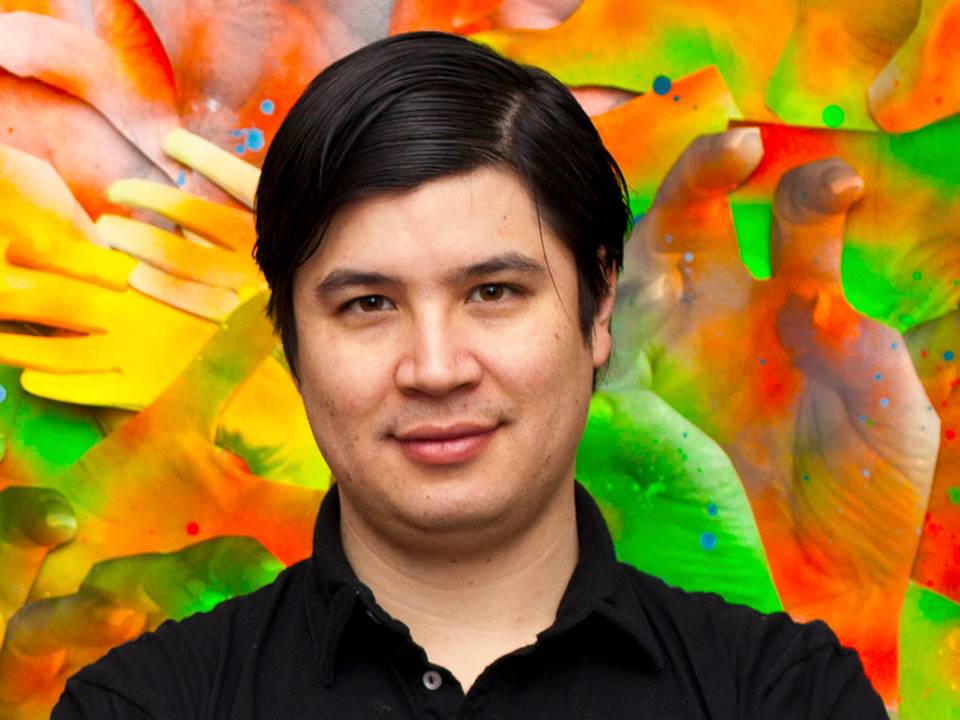
Wong in 2008

Joe Wong (born 1980) is an American multi-instrumentalist, singer, composer, and podcaster based in Los Angeles, California. He is currently the host of The Trap Set, a weekly podcast and radio show about the lives of musicians.

As a drummer he is known for his work with Parts & Labor, Marnie Stern, Aa, Man Forever, and Mary Timony. Wong was also chosen to participate in the Boredoms' event 88 Boadrum. Wong's drumming style has been described as "trancelike", "propulsive", and "explosive".

As a composer he has worked on projects that include the hit Netflix series Russian Doll and Master of None; the Sundance Special Jury Prize winning feature, The Pool; documentaries such as Collapse, The Yes Men, and Independent Lens; the hit young adult film To All the Boys I've Loved Before; and avant-garde work such as Adult Swim's Superjail! and the 2014 film Hamlet A.D.D.. Wong's scoring projects have garnered praise from the New York Times, Time, and The A.V. Club.

On September 18, 2020, he released his full-length solo debut, Nite Creatures, on Decca Records. The album was produced by Mary Timony of Ex Hex, and features Steven Drozd of The Flaming Lips, Jon Natchez of War on Drugs, Shudder to Think frontman Craig Wedren, Anna Waronker of That Dog, Mary Lattimore, and a 24-piece orchestra.

== Life ==
Wong began studying piano at age six and gravitated towards drums at eleven. While in high school, Wong formed the band Akarso with his friend Nathan Lilley, who later sang for Call Me Lightning. The band toured and released three recordings, most notably a split record with the band Faraquet. Wong attended the Berklee College of Music in Boston, Massachusetts and was awarded a scholarship.

After college, Wong moved to a farmhouse in northern Wisconsin where he practiced drums up to 14 hours per day. In 2001 Wong moved to Washington, D.C., and played in a short-lived band with former Faraquet guitarist, Devin Ocampo, and Bluetip bassist Jake Kump. In 2003 Wong co-scored The Yes Men with his friend Didier Leplae. This began a creative partnership that has produced the scores to several films and television shows.

In 2007, Wong joined New York City-based band Parts & Labor, recording two albums with the band. In 2012, Wong moved to Los Angeles, where he currently resides.

== Filmography ==
- The Yes Men (2003)
- The Pool (2007)
- Modus Operandi (2009)
- The Yes Men Fix the World (2009)
- Collapse (2009)
- Robotomy (2010)
- 6 Days to Air: The Making of South Park (2011)
- Superjail! (2012)
- Independent Lens: "The Powerbroker" (2013)
- Hamlet A.D.D. (2014)
- Master of None (2015)
- All This Panic (2016)
- Awkwafina Is Nora from Queens (2018)
- To All the Boys I've Loved Before (2018)
- Ballmastrz: 9009 (2018)
- Seven Stages to Achieve Eternal Bliss By Passing Through the Gateway Chosen By the Holy Storsh (2018)
- Russian Doll (2019)
- Breakfast, Lunch & Dinner (2019)
- Black Licorice (2019)
- Siempre, Luis (2020)
- To All the Boys: P.S. I Still Love You (2020)
- Ugly Delicious (2020)
- The Midnight Gospel (2020)
- Will Trent (2023)
- Carol & The End of The World (2023)
- Krapopolis (2023-present)

== Discography ==
- 2002, Beauty Pill, Unsustainable Lifestyle, percussionist
- 2008, Parts & Labor, Receivers, drummer
- 2011, Parts & Labor, Constant Future, drummer
- 2020, Joe Wong, Nite Creatures, singer & multi-instrumentalist
- 2024, Joe Wong, Mere Survival, singer & multi-instrumentalist
