= Stay Afraid =

Studio album by Parts & Labor
- Released: April 11, 2006
- Recorded: June 2005
- Genre: Noise rock
- Label: Jagjaguwar, Brah

Parts & Labor chronology
Rise, Rise, Rise (2003)	Stay Afraid (2006)	Mapmaker (2007)

Stay Afraid is the second studio album from Parts & Labor. The album was released in April 11, 2006 on Jagjaguwar.

== Track listing ==
1. "A Great Divide"
2. "Drastic Measures"
3. "A Pleasant Stay"
4. "New Buildings"
5. "Death"
6. "Timeline"
7. "Repair"
8. "Stay Afraid"
9. "Springtime Hibernation"
10. "Changing of the Guard"

== Reception ==
- Pitchfork Media (7.7/10) 12 April 2006
