= Constant Future =

Studio album by Parts & Labor
- Released: March 8, 2011
- Genre: Noise rock
- Label: Jagjaguwar Records

Parts & Labor chronology
Receivers (album) (2008)	Constant Future (2011)

Constant Future is the fifth full-length release from Parts & Labor, released in 2011 on Jagjaguwar Records.

== Track listing ==
1. "Fake Names"
2. "Outnumbered"
3. "Constant Future"
4. "A Thousand Roads"
5. "Rest"
6. "Pure Annihilation"
7. "Skin And Bones"
8. "Echo Chamber"
9. "Without A Seed"
10. "Bright White"
11. "Hurricane"
12. "Never Changer"

== Reception ==
- Pitchfork (7.6/10) 8 March 2011
