= Stephen Warbrick =

American animator, producer, writer and voice actor

- Occupations: Animator, producer, writer, voice actor

Stephen Warbrick is an American animator, producer, voice actor and writer. He is best known for co-creating the American adult animated television series Superjail!, which he co-created with Christy Karacas and Ben Gruber.

Warbrick began his career at MTV Animation, and worked in the stop motion claymation television series Celebrity Deathmatch. In 2006, He directed the short film Bar Fight, with his partner, Christy Karacas. He was also an animator at Blue Sky Studios.
