= The Pool (2007 film) =

2007 American drama film

- The Pool poster
- Directed by: Chris Smith
- Written by: Chris Smith; Randy Russell
- Produced by: Kate Noble
- Starring: Venkatesh Chavan; Jhangir Badshah; Ayesha Mohan; Nana Patekar
- Cinematography: Chris Smith
- Edited by: Barry Poltermann
- Music by: Didier Leplae; Joe Wong
- Distributed by: Vitagraph Films
- Release date: January 18, 2007
- Running time: 95 minutes
- Country: United States
- Language: Hindi

The Pool is a 2007 American drama film co-written and directed by Chris Smith. The film stars non-professional actors Venkatesh Chavan and Jhangir Badshah, as well as Bollywood veteran Nana Patekar and newcomer Ayesha Mohan.

Though filmed in Hindi, a language Smith didn't know, the film earned good reviews. Besides winning a Special Jury prize at the 2007 Sundance Film Festival, the film won accolades from Geoffrey Gilmore, director of the Sundance Film Festival. In the same year, it was screened at the Vienna International Film Festival and International Film Festival of India.

The DVD was released on 13 July 2010.

== Plot ==
The story revolves around a young janitor working at a hotel in the port city of Panjim, India, who sees from his perch in a mango tree a luxuriant garden and shimmering pool hidden behind a wall. In making whatever efforts he can to better himself, Venkatesh offers his services to the wealthy owner of the home. Not content to simply dream about a different life, Venkatesh is inquisitive about the home's inhabitants and his curiosity changes the shape of his future.

== Cast ==
- Nana Patekar as Nana
- Venkatesh Chavan as Venkatesh
- Jhangir Badshah as Jhangir
- Ayesha Mohan as Ayesha

== Production ==
After American Job (1996), American Movie (1999), Home Movie (2001), and The Yes Men (2003), Milwaukee-based director Chris Smith read a story, written by Randy Russel, about a person from a graduate school in Iowa. This person, who is out running, sees a swimming pool and gets obsessed with swimming in it. He follows around the people who own the place and tries to befriend them. However, Smith clarified that the film's story evolved from it in a "completely different way from there". He said that though they had a draft in hand while beginning the shooting, his goal was to let the environment (the actors, their experiences and observations) shape the story.

The film is a collaborative result of a crew that was half-based in India and United States. The crew included producer Kate Noble, creative consultant Xavier Leplae, whose film I'm Bobby was shot in the Indian state of Goa. Xavier's brother, Didier Leplae, who composed the score with Joe Wong in Milwaukee, had it arranged by a Bollywood composer, and recorded by a small orchestra in Mumbai. The film also credits independent film representative and producer John Sloss, who has handled all of his films, as being his "conduit to the rest of the world," and said that it was Sloss' work on his behalf that "has allowed me to stay in Milwaukee." Barry Poltermann, who edited The Pool and American Movie, continued his association with Smith with this film.

Though the story was originally set in Iowa, Smith chose the port city of Panjim, Goa due to his long-time fascination with the city, especially the contrast between the rich and the poor. For the 65-day shoot, Smith and his crew moved to India for a five-month period. While referring to this cinematic endeavour as an experiment, he felt that the journey to India was crucial in clearing up his creative space to work.

Smith once thought of aborting the project because they were unsuccessful in locating a bungalow with a pool. Eventually, they managed to lease one from a New Zealand-Indian.

=== Casting ===
Saying that this film was the hardest he ever worked on in his life, Smith added that casting for the film was quite a challenge. The crew lost three lead actors due to various reasons. While one of them went to Mumbai on the pretext of buying karate uniforms and never returned, a young girl could not obtain permission for leave from school. The actor originally chosen for the father's role left them for a television series. These unfortunate incidents happened three days prior to commencement of the shoot.

After a casting director, who had previously worked with Ayesha Mohan, sent them her details, she was chosen to play the main actress. Speaking about how they identified Nana Patekar, a veteran Bollywood actor, Smith said:

When you're trying to cast, you will look anywhere and everywhere. At dinner, we would look at the waiters. And one day, this newspaper came (to their hotel room) with a story on Nana (Patekar). And it said that he takes his time between movies and likes to do interesting projects. And Kate thought he looked perfect. We liked his eyes and the way he handled himself in the interview. And he seemed a kindred spirit to what we were trying to do.

Smith was convinced that if Patekar agreed to play the role, the film would get a boost. Actress Mohan helped him approach Anurag Kashyap, who directed her in the Bollywood film Black Friday (2004). Initially, Patekar was not interested to do the film. But Kashyap urged him to take a look at 45 minutes of the film's footage. Upon watching it, Patekar remained quiet for some time and then he said, "this reminds me of what we used to do before we got corrupted." According to Smith, Patekar not just played his character, but also helped out in various scenes while filming.

20-year-old Venkatesh Chavan, who played the role of the young boy fascinated by the pool, originally hailed from Mundargi town in Gadag district of Karnataka. Chavan's parents left for Goa in search of work. While Smith was in the process of casting, Venkatesh was helping his parents to sell scrap. In January 2006, when he was roaming on the streets of Vasco da Gama, Smith met him, introduced himself and asked him to act in his film. Venkatesh took his parents' permission and agreed. His mother and sister were asked to play the role of his mother and sister in the film as well. He received INR 60,000 as compensation for acting in the film. While filming, Chavan thought it was a documentary. Jhangir, who was selected to play the 11-year-old character, worked as an employee in a bar/restaurant.

=== Filmmaking ===
"We would cut scenes together – then either adapt other scenes or shoot new scenes to compliment [sic] what we already had. The great thing was I could think of a scene at night and we could shoot it the next morning – give the tape to the editor at lunch and see it in the cut the next night."

—Chris Smith, director

Neither of the young leads could read, so they couldn't really prepare their scenes in advance. They had to rehearse on the spot and once they got it right, the scene was shot. Another complication was their language. Since neither of them spoke English, it was difficult for Smith to directly convey detailed direction. Hence, with a translator in place, it could easily get translated in the wrong way. Another challenge was that the film was being shot in Hindi, which was not the first language of either of them. In addition, Smith had absolutely no knowledge of Hindi. Effectively, they were being directed in a language they did not understand and having to shoot complex dialogue scenes in a language alien to them.

Poltermann was editing while the filming was in progress. Smith thought that this process had a huge impact on the finished film.

== Critical reception ==
On Rotten Tomatoes, the film has an aggregate score of 94% based on 45 positive and 3 negative critics' reviews. The website consensus reads: "Beautifully crafted with loosely drawn characters and a lilting, natural pace, Chris Smith's The Pool features a universal message to which everyone can relate." The film appeared on several critics' top ten lists of the best films of 2008. Marjorie Baumgarten of The Austin Chronicle named it the fourth best film of 2008, Sheri Linden of The Hollywood Reporter named it the fourth best film of 2008, and Tasha Robinson of The A.V. Club named it the tenth best film of 2008.
