= Ben Gruber =

American television producer and writer

- Born: Benjamin Peabody Gruber; January 2, 1972 (age 54)
- Occupations: Television producer; screenwriter
- Years active: 1991–present
- Notable work: Superjail! Breadwinners; Teen Titans Go! SpongeBob SquarePants; Jellystone!

Benjamin Peabody Gruber (born January 2, 1972) is an American television producer and writer. He is known for his work on Superjail!, Breadwinners, Teen Titans Go!, and SpongeBob SquarePants.

== Filmography ==
=== Television ===
Year	Title	Notes
1998	Cartoon Sushi	Director (segment "Ultracity 6060")
2007	Monk	Writer (Ep. ""Mr. Monk and the Man Who Shot Santa Claus")
2008	Superjail!	Creator; Executive Producer; Writer (Ep. "Mr. Grumpy-Pants")
2008	Human Giant	Writer (segment "She Be a Witch")
2008–2009	Speed Racer: The Next Generation	Writer
2014	Breadwinners	Writer
2015–2019	Teen Titans Go!	Writer
2016–2019, 2021	SpongeBob SquarePants	Writer
2017–2020	Unikitty!	Writer, Story Writer, Producer
2021–2025	Jellystone!	Writer, Story Editor
