= A Better Life (album) =

Studio album by Spring King
- Released: 31 August 2018
- Genre: Garage rock; indie rock; surf punk
- Length: 44:19
- Label: Island

Spring King chronology
Tell Me If You Like To (2016)	A Better Life (2018)

Singles from A Better Life
- 1. "Animal" Released: 3 May 2018; 2. "Us Vs Them" Released: 1 June 2018; 3. "The Hum" Released: 18 July 2018; 4. "Paranoid" Released: 24 August 2018

A Better Life is the second and final studio album by British garage rock band, Spring King. The album was released on 31 August 2018 through Island Records.

== Track listing ==
All music is composed by Spring King

No.	Title	Length
1.	"Static (Intro)"	0:25
2.	"Animal"	2:58
3.	"Ready For War"	2:58
4.	"Let's Drink"	3:32
5.	"Paranoid"	3:32
6.	"The Hum"	4:06
7.	"Lightning (Interlude)"	0:32
8.	"Us Vs Them"	3:42
9.	"Echo Chamber"	3:39
10.	"No More"	3:26
11.	"Radioactive!"	3:57
12.	"Have You Ever Looked Up Into the Sky?"	3:29
13.	"Thicker Skin"	3:52
14.	"Thunder"	4:11
Total length:		44:19
