= Parts & Labor =

American rock band

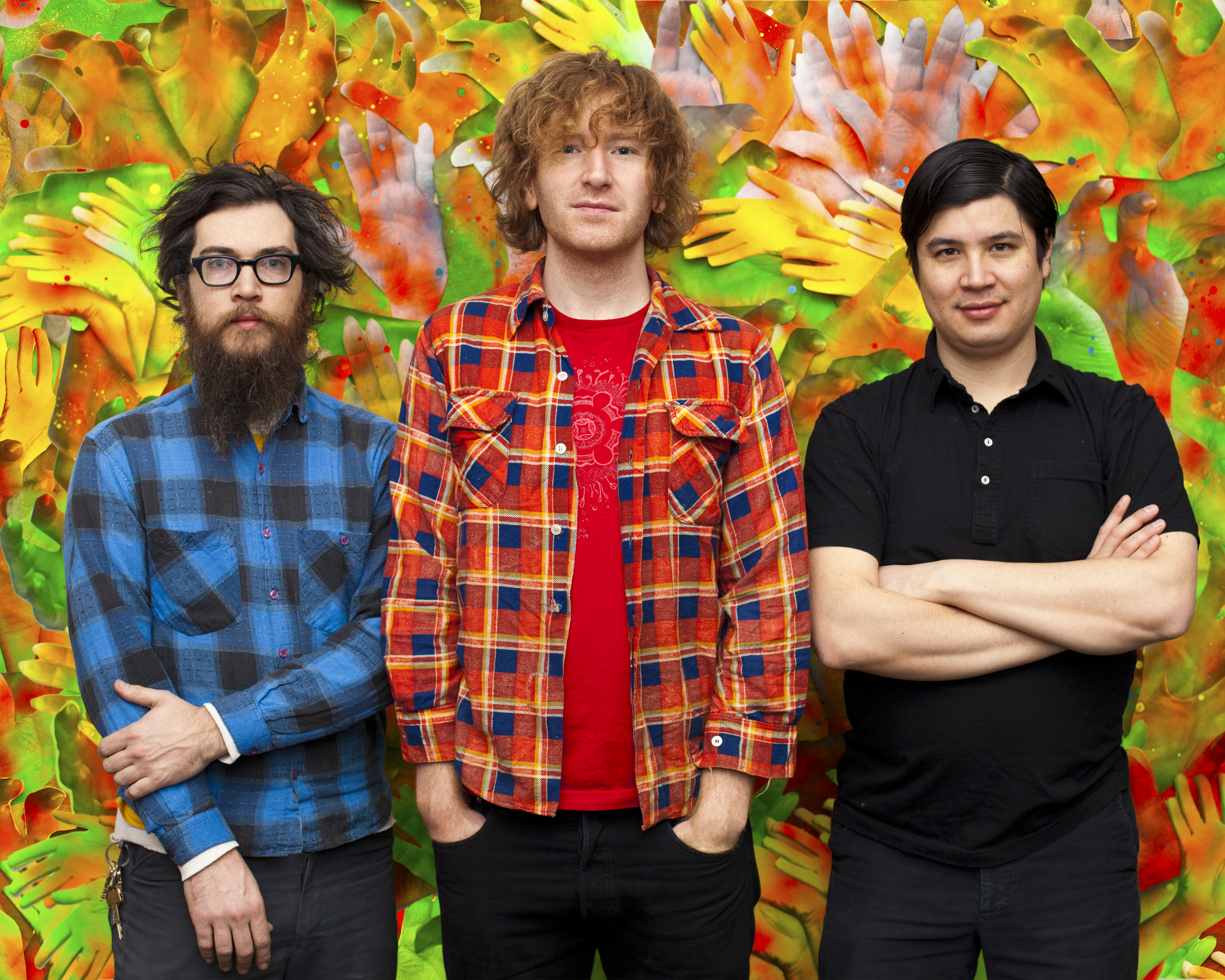
- Parts & Labor (BJ Warshaw, Dan Friel, and Joe Wong) circa 2011

Background information
- Origin: New York City, New York, U.S.
- Genres: Noise rock; noise pop; experimental rock
- Years active: 2002–2012, 2026–present
- Labels: Ernest Jenning Record Co., Jagjaguwar
- Members: Dan Friel: BJ Warshaw; Christopher Weingarten; Joe Wong
- Past members: Jim Sykes; Joel Saladino; Sarah Lipstate
- Website: www.partsandlabor.net

Parts & Labor is an American rock band formed in 2002 by BJ Warshaw and Dan Friel in Brooklyn, New York. Parts & Labor released five albums, two EPs, one split release (with Tyondai Braxton) and numerous 7"s and compilation tracks. The band is inspired by the combination of noise and melody in artists like Mission of Burma, Hüsker Dü and Boredoms.

Drummer Christopher Weingarten left the band in 2008 but they quickly recruited new drummer Joe Wong and added guitarist Sarah Lipstate, turning them into a four-piece band. This lineup recorded Receivers, the band's fourth album, which was released on October 21, 2008 in North America and November 3, 2008 in the UK through Jagjaguwar. Also released in 2008 was Escapers Two, a record which featured 51 songs in around 29 minutes. On July 10, 2009, Lipstate announced via her website she had left the band.

The band played their 10th anniversary and final show on Friday, February 24, 2012.

Parts & Labor reunited in 2026 with a double-drummer lineup featuring both Weingarten and Wong. Sixth album, Set of All Sets, was announced with the 20-minute, four-part Single "Endless Cycle Pts. 1-4."

Friel and Warshaw also run Cardboard Records, an independent record label that has released music by Pterodactyl, Gowns, Ecstatic Sunshine and others.

== Band members ==
Current members

- Dan Friel – keyboards, guitar, vocals (2002–2012, 2026–present)
- BJ Warshaw – bass guitar, vocals (2002–2012, 2026–present)
- Christopher Weingarten – drums (2004–2008, 2026–present)
- Joe Wong – drums (2008–2012, 2026–present)

Former members

- Jim Sykes – drums (2002)
- Joel Saladino – drums (2002–2004)
- Sarah Lipstate – guitar (2008–2009)

Former touring members

- Tom Martin – guitar (2011–2012)

== Discography ==
Studio albums

- Groundswell (JMZ Records, 2003)
- Stay Afraid (Jagjaguwar, 2006)
- Mapmaker (Jagjaguwar, 2007)
- Receivers (Jagjaguwar, 2008)
- Constant Future (Jagjaguwar, 2011)
- Set of All Sets (Ernest Jenning Record Co., 2026)

Splits and EPs

- Rise, Rise, Rise (split LP with Tyondai Braxton, Narnack Records, 2003)
- Escapers One 12" (Brooklyn Beats, 2007)
- Escapers Two (Ace Fu Records, 2008)

7" Singles

- Parts & Labor (JMZ Records, 2003)
- A Great Divide (Plastic Records, 2004)
- PAaRTS & LAaBOR (Split 7" with Big A Little A) (Cardboard Records, 2006)
- Tour (Altin Village & Mine Records, 2008)
