= Joe Bradley (artist) =

American painter (born 1975)

- Born: 1975 (age 50–51); Kittery, Maine, U.S.
- Education: Rhode Island School of Design
- Occupation: Painter
- Movement: Color Field painting, Minimalism
- Spouse: Valentina Akerman
- Children: 4

Joe Bradley (born 1975) is an American visual artist, known for his minimalist and color field paintings. Bradley has been based in New York City and Amagansett.

== Early life and education ==
Joe Bradley was born 1975 in Kittery, Maine. The artist had his first gallery exhibition in New York after earning his BFA degree from the Rhode Island School of Design (RISD) in 1999. It was just three years later that he had his first solo museum show at MoMA PS1.

== Career ==
Bradley makes casualist paintings resembling human figures from assembled canvases which reference Color Field painting and Minimalism. Bradley has said his work is "intentionally shoddy" and "pathetic" thanks in part to his use of flimsy shop-bought canvases, but he selects his colors and surface textures with care.

Bradley has developed a style of visual language that is fluid throughout both the art historical canon and the artist's personal experiences. Bradley continually reinvents his work in his paintings, drawings, and sculptures, with a profound fluency in iconic modes of art-making that allows him to elegantly move throughout Abstraction, Minimalism, and the gestural mark-making of Abstract Expressionism. To him, the act of painting requires one to travel amongst the infinite conversations of painters past and present, frequently referencing what he calls the "shared space" of painting, an embracing of the relative nature of all visual art.

In addition to his primary career, Bradley has also been active in music, having served as the lead singer for American hard rock band Cheeseburger.

== Art market ==
Bradley's work breached the $1 million mark in 2014, when one of his abstract paintings on drop cloth sold for over $1.5 million at Christie's London.

== Exhibitions ==
Bradley has presented numerous solo exhibitions including Time-Slip at Petzel Gallery, New York, US in 2021, Krasdale at Gagosian, New York, US in 2016, and Schmagoo Paintings at Canada, New York, US in 2008. Bradley's major institutional group exhibitions include Joe Bradley, Oscar Tuazon, Michael Williams, The Brant Foundation Art Study Center, Greenwich, CT, US (2018); New York Painting, Kunstmuseum Bonn, Bonn, DE (2015); The Forever Now: Contemporary Painting in an Atemporal World, curated by Laura Hoptman, Museum of Modern Art, New York, NY, US (2014); and EXPO 1: NEW YORK, curated by Klaus Biesenbach, MoMA PS1, Long Island, NY, US (2013).

Bradley's work was also included in Whitney Biennial 2008, curated by Henriette Huldisch and Shamim M. Momin, and overseen by Donna De Salvo at the Whitney Museum of American Art.

=== Solo exhibitions ===
List of select solo exhibitions include:

- 2025 – New Paltz, Xavier Hufkens, Brussels, Belgium
- 2018 – Day World, Gagosian, Grosvenor Hill, London, UK
- 2013 – Lotus Beaters, Gavin Brown's Enterprise, New York, US
- 2011 – Mouths and Foot Painting, Gavin Brown's Enterprise, New York, US
- 2011 – Human Form, Canada, New York, US
- 2006 – Kurgan Waves, Canada, New York, US

== Personal life ==
Bradley is married to architect, designer, urbanist and thinker Valentina Akerman. Together they raise four children.
