= Ballmastrz: 9009 =

American adult animated television series

- Genre: Adult animation; Black comedy; Science fiction comedy; Animated sitcom
- Created by: Christy Karacas
- Directed by: Christy Karacas
- Voices of: Natasha Lyonne; Jessica DiCicco; Dana Snyder; Eric Bauza; Dave Willis; Christy Karacas
- Composers: Didier Leplae; Joe Wong
- Countries of origin: United States; Japan (special)
- Original languages: English; Japanese
- No. of seasons: 2
- No. of episodes: 21

Production
- Executive producers: Christy Karacas; Chris Prynoski; Shannon Prynoski; Keith Crofford; Walter Newman
- Producer: Ollie Green
- Editors: Simon Barreto (Note: Season 1, only); Stephen Mlinarcik; Greg Buracker (Note: Season 2, only); Zach Lapidus; Andrew Reuland (Note: Rubicon, only)
- Running time: 11 minutes; 22 minutes (Rubicon)
- Production companies: Williams Street; Titmouse, Inc. (series); C.C.K. Rad (Season 2); PFFR (special); Studio 4°C (special)

Original release
- Network: Adult Swim
- Release: April 9, 2018 – February 20, 2023

Ballmastrz: 9009 (ボールマスターズ: 9009) is an adult animated sitcom created by Christy Karacas for Cartoon Network's nighttime programming block Adult Swim. The series stars actress Natasha Lyonne as the voice of Gaz Digzy, a mixed race athletic superstar in a dystopian future where humanity is satiated by a violent sport simply known as "The Game". The series is characterized by anime-style iconography, dark humor, and shock value.

The show premiered on April 9, 2018. In July 2019, the show was renewed for a second season, which premiered on February 24, 2020. A special titled Ballmastrz: Rubicon aired on February 20, 2023. The special has a substantially higher quality animation style than the series, due to Studio 4°C's involvement; it is meant to serve as a fork possibly leading to future seasons. As of October 2023, no new episodes are in development at Adult Swim, though plans may change in the future.

== Premise ==
In a post-apocalyptic world ravaged by a string of devastating "Rad Wars," a mysterious man named Crayzar creates a roller derby-like sport known as "The Game", in which two teams try to score more points than the other using a ball. During the match, players can be "killed" (in that they are teleported to a holding area to be revived after receiving lethal wounds) to take them out of the match. The series follows Gaz Digzy, the former captain of the best team in the Game, The Boom Boom Boys, who is demoted to playing on the worst team in the Game, The Leptons. Her only way back to the top is to somehow lead these pathetic misfits and 'ultimate losers' to victory.

As the series progresses, The Game is slowly clarified. Initially an ill-explained violent sport between two teams with balls, it developed into a very simple competition where each team attempts to score goals with their respective ball, the goals being a small ball-sized indent on opposing sides of the play area the ball is stuck into. The balls themselves are anthropomorphic and sapient, and their personalities are similar to each team's anime-inspired theme.

The premise is possibly inspired by 1975 film Rollerball, which details a futuristic corporate dystopian society wherein the violent Rollerball game is the main recreational sport of the world.

== Cast and characters ==
=== Main ===
- Natasha Lyonne as Gaz Digzy, a mixed-race star athlete in "The Game" and a former captain of the Boom Boom Boys, who wrecked her own career due to sheer boredom and subsequently found herself teamless, slightly obese, and maligned by various diseases. She is a foul-mouthed, hard drinking has-been whose only hope is to join the Leptons and reclaim her glory. By the end of Season 1, she warms up to the Leptons and decides to stay as their new captain. In Season 2, Gaz's full name is revealed to be Gazmerelda Digzfield, daughter of moon mining tycoon Rupert T. Digzfield IV, and it is also revealed that she became a player in the Game as a way of getting back at her uptight biological family. As the series progresses, she became more sociable, happy, and responsible due to spending time with the Leptons.
- Jessica DiCicco as Ace Ambling, a 12-year-old Japanese-American orphan and the lead player of the Leptons. He is bright, cheerful, and optimistic, but can lose his patience when things don't go as planned. He looks up to Gaz, and though he seems oblivious to her indifference to him, he eventually realizes her flaws and attempts to bring out the best in her. Despite his cheery demeanor, he often feels neglected or looked down upon by the team. Ace is revealed to be descended from the Ballmasters who fought in the Rad Wars; he can become a Ballmaster by fusing with Babyball.
  - DiCicco also voices Duleena "Dee Dee" Duneeda, an anime-esque girl on the team. She is a mood swinger, alternating between being soft-spoken and caring and enraged and violent, usually when provoked. She is also shown to have a crush on Leto and gets angered when he tries to downplay his relation to her. She is a former vampire hunter and thus has a large amount of knowledge on the occult.
- Dana Snyder as Babyball, a crass and cynical robotic The Game ball who is similar to Gaz Digzy, he looks down on his own team and wishes for better players. However, he can access a special ability when paired with Ace, whom he dislikes due to his cheeriness; he does begin to warm up to Ace and eventually calls him his friend. Despite this, Babyball is selfish, boastful, and will mock his teammates regardless.
  - Snyder also voices Stinkfinger, a living severed finger that is part of the rival team, the Murderous Misfits.
- Eric Bauza as Flypp Champion, a body stump with a spiked "sensory deprivation" helmet. A true warrior, Flypp must rely on his navel to perform certain tasks. Despite claiming to have amazing abilities, which he arguably does, he still seems rather useless and is typically brushed aside with ease by other players. He was apparently once a great defender of the innocent, but through a series of training regimes, chose to simplify himself and put all his energy into Umbilicus, a large umbilical cord that extends from his navel. Flypp is boisterous, but also egotistical, fancying himself a mighty warrior despite his frequent failures.
- Dave Willis as Leto Otel, a lethargic and pessimistic member of the Leptons. He lacks the motivation and prowess to be an effective player and does not seem interested in the Game, to the point that he is not phased by mortal injuries. He quotes poetry and seems intelligent at times. While Dee Dee openly shows affection for him, Leto is reluctant to reciprocate. He has at times revealed to become sad, more so than usual, when Dee Dee briefly leaves.
- Christy Karacas as Crayzar, the ruler of the Consortium who created the Game to please humanity. He lived through the Rad Wars and gave life to all of the game balls, which were originally used as weapons in the wars. He seemingly admires the Leptons, but after Ace and Babyball's fusion, might have ulterior motives. In "Wish You Upon A Spore", Crayzar is revealed to be a near-immortal demigod cyborg. In the Rubicon special, it is revealed that Crayzar is from a race of demigods known as the Saytars, with his true name being Gold Saytar, and that he went against his assigned mission to find the "Cosmo Diary" by tricking all of Earth into worshipping him as a god via The Game.
  - Karacas also voices Aboo Buvu, a The Game ball with sunglasses who reports the news and acts as a moderator for The Game. In some material produced for the show, he is referred to as Blabberball.
- Christopher McCulloch as various characters.

The Leptons also include two characters who do not have voice actors but are prominent: Lulu, a cowardly green ape-like alien and Bob, a diminutive grey alien.

=== Guest ===
- Norman Reedus as Bacchus LaBrute, the blue-skinned greaser-style leader of a biker gang called the Middle Fingers, who are cyborg aliens that live in the wastelands.
- Stephanie Sheh as Luna, the leader of the Sailor Moon-esque team the Ashigari Princesses and an old rival of Gaz who wants to steal the secret of the Ballmaster formation.
  - Sheh also voices Rudy Drax, a albino boy without limbs who idolizes Flypp Champion.
- Mike O'Gorman as Buddy Marinara, the Leptons' two-faced manager who is always looking for a way to exploit his team's newfound fame.
  - O'Gorman also voices a shopkeeper of an Animal Shelter that Ace volunteers at.
- Jo Firestone as Ace's Robotic Mother, a robot disguised as a fancy-dressed woman who adopts Ace.
- Rachel Dratch as The Blab, a talking worm-like STD creature that grows out of Gaz's stomach.
- Cree Summer as Obah Wexley, a blue-skinned Oprah Winfrey-like alien who works as a talk show host.
- Doc Hammer as Milky van Montebag, a blond-haired manager who tries to cash in on Ace's fame.
  - Hammer also voices the mecha butler in Rupert's mansion.
- Ed Asner as Rupert T. Digzfield IV, Gaz's rich father and founder of the Digzfield Lunar Drilling Corporation.
- Joshua Henry as Demon Saytar, Crayzar's father.
- Timothy Levitch as Tyetaynus, Crayzar's younger brother.

== Episodes ==
| Season | Episodes | Originally released | |
| Season | Episodes | First released | Last released |
|---|---|---|---|
| 1 | 10 | April 9, 2018 | May 7, 2018 |
| 2 | 10 | February 24, 2020 | March 23, 2020 |
| Special | 1 | February 20, 2023 | |

=== Season 1 (2018) ===
Phil Ahn and Christy Karacas provide the storyboards for every episode, but there are different co-storyboarders that work with them depending on the episode.

| No. overall | No. in season | Title | Written by | Co-storyboarded by | Original release date | Viewers (millions) |
|---|---|---|---|---|---|---|
| 1 | 1 | "A Shooting Star Named Gaz Digzy Falls Fast & Hard!" | Christy Karacas | Mike Carlo | April 9, 2018 | 0.812 |
In the far future after the Rad Wars, the great one, Crayzar, creates a new sport called "The Game" so that the world can live in peace. A notorious team known as the Leptons are the worst, yet its youngest member, an orphan named Ace, tries to remain optimistic about winning. Meanwhile, Gaz Digzy, a famous member of the Boom Boom Boys, has grown bored of her fame and decides to party hard resulting in her arrest, rehab, getting kicked off the team, and slightly becoming out of shape and rounder. Crayzar has her join the Leptons and promises her to give her team back if she can win one game with them, much to her chagrin.
| 2 | 2 | "With the Burning Spirit of Teamwork in Her Heart!" | Adam Modiano | Mike Carlo | April 9, 2018 | 0.773 |
Ace is overjoyed at Gaz joining the Leptons as he is a fan of hers, but she berates and looks down on them for their poor skills. Babyball, the team's ball member, presents Gaz with the prospect of working together to leave the team. As the Leptons battle the Murderous Misfits, Gaz and Babyball intentionally harm their team angering and upsetting Ace who criticize Gaz. Infuriated at being criticized, she, in turn, tosses Babyball so hard that he and Ace fuse and take out the opposing team, but accidentally score in the other goal. Nevertheless, the audience is enthralled by this development and Ace hugs an annoyed Gaz.
| 3 | 3 | "Very Special Balls!" | Scotty Landes, Adam Modiano, Andrew Reuland & Christy Karacas | Ronnie Liu | April 16, 2018 | 0.702 |
After the successful fusion, dubbed Ballmaster, Buddy Marinara, the Leptons' manager, has Ace and Babyball challenge Xythryll, a mutated chinchilla that resides at an abandoned factory. Gaz once again belittles the two for not knowing how to fuse so they decide to go and meet Crayzar. Crayzar reveals that years ago, Ballmasters would battle during the Rad Wars. When the war ended, Crayzar collected the leftover balls and gave life to them as game balls believing that the time of the Ballmasters was over. He tells them that Ace and Babyball need to synchronize their personalities. They successfully do so, but accidentally release Xythryll angering the audience.
| 4 | 4 | "To Catch a Princess" | Ben Coccio | Ronnie Liu | April 16, 2018 | 0.638 |
Ace is addicted to playing the video game To Catch a Princess. During a playthrough, he meets Luna who offers to meet with Ace in real life at the Rad Wars Memorial Park. He takes Babyball along, as his avatar looks like the two combined, but Luna turns out to be the leader of the rival team the Ashigari Princesses who threaten the two into revealing their secret to becoming Ballmaster. Gaz herself gets addicted to the game and forgets Ace and Babyball until Leto informs her. The Leptons arrive and rescue Ace and Babyball who fuse and defeat Luna and her team. After celebrating their victory, Ace sadly "releases" Luna from his game.
| 5 | 5 | "Breathe Deep to Win! Teamwork Cuts Through the Foul Odor of Obsession!" | Scotty Landes | Ronnie Liu | April 23, 2018 | 0.729 |
The Leptons are hit with a stink bomb that ruins their night. Gaz reveals that the bomb came from a fan of hers named Dieter who became so obsessed with her that the Boom Boom Boys tossed him into a power plant turning him into a stink being. After being hit with more stink bombs, Gaz hires Stinkfinger of the Murderous Misfits to help them acclimate to the stench. They eventually face off against the Pups, use their stink immunity to their advantage and take out Dieter who was watching. While the Leptons manage to make a point, the game gets cancelled due to too much stinkiness. Crayzar watches the outcome with intrigue and the Leptons all give each other a bath.
| 6 | 6 | "Honor! Money! Swords! Dongs! Ultimate Gaz Boom Boom Rookie Card Battle Begin! Fight!" | Ben Coccio | Ronnie Liu | April 23, 2018 | 0.651 |
On Holo-Card Day, the Leptons get new Holo-Cards including a hungover Gaz. When Ace reveals that he owns a rare Gaz Boom Boom Rookie Card, that notoriously looks like she is about to give a blowjob, Gaz reveals that she bought up all remaining cards and left them with her ex, criminal Jojo Cracko. Due to their worth, Gaz, Ace and Babyball all head to his estate and battle the security head, Yukioi, and several robots. Jojo is revealed to live in fear of Gaz, having put a restraining order on her, and gives the Holo-Cards back with Gaz actually complimenting Ace for once. However, Gaz learns on the news that her new card is just as embarrassing as the old one.
| 7 | 7 | "Leather Passions! 2 Hearts, 2 Wheelz, Infinite Roadz. Ride Now!" | Andrew Reuland | Ronnie Liu & Mike Carlo | April 30, 2018 | 0.697 |
While travelling through the desert, the Leptons stop to refuel and accidentally disturb a biker gang called the Middle Fingers. The group gets into a fight and Dee Dee displays violent behaviour that impresses their leader Bacchus LaBrute. When Leto denies that Dee Dee is his girlfriend, she angrily "dumps" him and decides to stay with the Middle Fingers. Leto admits that he feels empty without Dee Dee and the Leptons have him confront Bacchus, who challenges Leto to a bike race. Ace and Babyball fuse into a motorcycle, Leto races Bacchus and defeats him. When he tries to kill Leto, Dee Dee comes to his aid and rejoins the Leptons with Leto wanting to take things slow.
| 8 | 8 | "Hunger Cramps on the Playing Field of Friendship" | Adam Modiano | Ronnie Liu | April 30, 2018 | 0.633 |
After losing against the Choo Choo Chums, the Leptons quickly ditch Ace after he suggests volunteering at the animal shelter. Ace sneaks in some B.E.H.O. for the animals, but hides it in his mouth, accidentally eating it. He ends up liking it and gets hooked on binge eating B.E.H.O.'s nonstop especially after Gaz ditches him again. Ace quickly takes his frustrations out on the Choo Choo Chums and the Leptons learn about Ace's addiction. Ace begins transforming into a hideous monster and swallows his team. While inside, Gaz admits to Ace that they are his friends and promises to go to the animal shelter with him. Ace returns to normal and the Leptons, reluctantly, concede.
| 9 | 9 | "Chaste Wing of the Cold Turkey vs. Flaming Fist of Indulgence!" | Andrew Reuland | Ronnie Liu | May 7, 2018 | N/A |
Gaz decides to finally get back in shape, so Babyball makes a bet with her, if Gaz wins, he sews his mouth shut, but if he wins, Gaz must streak naked. Gaz has Flypp train her so that she can reacquire her abs. During her training, Babyball gets a sponsorship with Offal Ale to throw off Gaz resulting in her making a side bet, she will go sober until game day and Babyball will be her servant for a month. Gaz cheats on her training and studies Flypp's scrolls. While this seems to work at first, she loses her abs and decides to save face by streaking naked. The Leptons lose, but Gaz was sober so Babyball lost the side bet and ends up being her servant, losing the sponsorship in the process.
| 10 | 10 | "Strength Through Song; Brotherhood Through Blood; Redemption Through Rage. Sing, Fallen Angel!" | Christy Karacas, Adam Modiano & Scotty Landes | Ronnie Liu | May 7, 2018 | N/A |
The Leptons record a rap song for their final game against Gaz's former team, the Boom Boom Boys. Feeling humiliated, Gaz takes their recording and drowns her sorrows at a bar. She runs into her former teammates and leaves in frustration, dropping the recording in the process. When the Boom Boom Boys hear it, they decide to "help" her by playing it for them at their game. Gaz returns to the Leptons with the team preparing for defeat. However, when the Leptons hear their song, they think that Gaz was actually getting help from them and they suddenly gain a boost in confidence that makes them finally win their first game by one point. Crayzar offers Gaz a new team, but she asks for a beer instead.

=== Season 2 (2020) ===
| No. overall | No. in season | Title | Written by | Storyboard by | Original release date | Viewers (millions) |
|---|---|---|---|---|---|---|
| 11 | 1 | "Infinite Hugs: Cold Embrace of the Bloodless Progenitors!" | Adam Modiano | Ronnie Lu, Miyako Molinelli & Christy Karacas | February 24, 2020 | 0.612 |
Following their win, the Leptons enter a string of successes and earn numerous fan letters (some of which are dick pics). Ace, however, is sad because he does not have any close family to share his wins. To get him out of his depression, Gaz and Babyball create two robots who pretend to be his long-lost biological parents. The rest of the team reluctantly goes along with it as Ace happily spends the day with his "parents" who slowly grow concerned with his easily injurable body. The Robotic parents take Ace to a maintenance closet and announce their plan to convert him. The rest of the Leptons hear his cries and rush to save him. Despite this, Ace does not want to kill his "parents" but is forced to do so as Ballmaster. He admits that the Leptons are his family now.
| 12 | 2 | "Shameful Disease of Yackety Yack! Don't Talk Back! Be Silenced Forever!" | Christy Karacas & Andrew Reuland | Ronnie Lu, Miyako Molinelli & Christy Karacas | February 24, 2020 | 0.535 |
Gaz suddenly grows a small joke spewing head from her belly called the Blab, which is apparently a sexually transmitted disease. She has to appear on Obah Wexley's show the next day and sees a doctor, who turns out to be Crayzar. He tells them that they need to feed the Blab a special root to get rid of it. Ace and Babyball fly off to get it and feed it in time for the show, but the root needs to digest. Gaz puts on a one-piece dress to hide the Blab who still talks. She uses Leto's sock to create a puppet dubbed "Little Gaz" and explains that she is trying to vent her negative emotions. While it seems that things are a disaster, Obah announces that Gaz's guest spot is a success. The Leptons celebrate, but Gaz refuses to disclose who she slept with as the Blab dies.
| 13 | 3 | "Big Boy Body, Bigger Baby Boy Heart! Can You Endure the Pain of Love? Babyball, Discover It Now!" | Jimbo Matison | Ronnie Lu, Miyako Molinelli & Christy Karacas | March 2, 2020 | 0.460 |
Babyball solemnly wishes he could have a body and Crayzar grants his wish; giving him a large muscular body. This results in Babyball becoming nicer and jovial with everyone because he has a heart now. However, it quickly becomes apparent that this weakens his ability on the field; ironically causing Ace to become harsher and angrier with him. Gaz takes Babyball to a bar to toughen him up, but this fails spectacularly. During another game, the whole team is wiped out and Ace and Babyball fuse into Ballmaster with the latter "dangling...like a giant nutsack". Babyball beheads himself so that they can perform properly and win the game. Crayzar informs Babyball that he shares his heart with Ace who is his best friend. Babyball denies this, insults Ace and takes the team out to the bar with Crayzar comforting Ace.
| 14 | 4 | "Children of the Night Serenade Wet Nurse of Reprisal; Scream, Bloodsucker, Scream!" | Andrew Reuland | Ronnie Lu, Miyako Molinelli, Christy Karacas & Seth Brady | March 2, 2020 | 0.402 |
Gaz is at a dive bar and picks up a man named Bergdorf Sanguine who turns out to be a vampire. Later, she tries to suck Ace's blood for "the master", but is stopped by the rest of the Leptons. Bergdorf returns and takes Gaz away. Dee Dee reveals that she is a former vampire hunter, or rather pest exterminator when she was trying to pay off her student loans and she, Ace and Babyball head off to battle Bergdorf and his monster army, which they manage to do in spectacular fashion as Ballmaster. Gaz has been made Bergdorf's maid and is forced to clean up after him. Dee Dee and Ace manage to get through to Gaz who snaps out of her hypnosis and together they kill Bergdorf. Afterwards, Dee Dee furiously tells Gaz to stop picking up shadowy figures in dive bars while hammered and Gaz drunkenly agrees by asking more men out.
| 15 | 5 | "When You Wish Upon a Spore" | Ben Coccio | Ronnie Lu, Miyako Molinelli & Christy Karacas | March 9, 2020 | 0.553 |
The Leptons must do work with the Wish Program by getting visited by a boy named Rudy Drax, who suffers from a loss of appendages. He idolizes Flypp, but he insensitively insults the boy, activating the sensitivity sensors in the stadium (and confusing Gaz and Babyball who wonder why they never activated them). Crazyar teleports Flypp away for sensitivity training through virtual scenarios, but he turns out to be too much of jerk. Meanwhile, Rudy sees Flypp's room and absorbs his appendages, before defeating the Leptons in anger. As Flypp is placed in a final reality-altering scenario, he returns and finally apologizes for his behaviour, causing Rudy to implode. The Leptons are confused as Rudy was real and not a simulation. The virtual scenario tore a fabric in time and accidentally disintegrated Rudy, much to Crayzar and his team's horror.
| 16 | 6 | "Can't Stand the Heat? Ultimate Kitchen Technique! Finish Them, Warrior Bard!!" | Andrew Reuland | Ronnie Lu, Miyako Molinelli, Christy Karacas & Seth Brady | March 9, 2020 | 0.479 |
After winning another game, the Leptons all take hallucinogenic drugs, except for Ace who is too young. They all get the munchies, so Leto makes the team some grilled cheese sandwiches. To everyone's astonishment, the sandwiches are amazing and they suggest that he get on Crayzar's other show, Gourmet Gamers. Leto refuses as he is afraid of embarrassing himself. Nevertheless, Dee Dee tells Leto that he needs to toughen up and signs him on the show; leaving him completely out of his comfort zone. As his fellow chefs all get into a fight, Leto finds himself tossed through a series of humiliating tasks, much to everyone's amusement. Leto eventually gets the strength to finish through Dee Dee's support. His sandwich appears burnt and inedible, but Leto ends up winning when the judges are left speechless, thanks to the drugs.
| 17 | 7 | "Defective Affection?! Dodge the Wayward Strikes of Cupid's Calamitous Quiver!" | Adam Modiano | Ronnie Lu, Miyako Molinelli, Christy Karacas & Ray Alma | March 16, 2020 | 0.592 |
When Gaz and Dee Dee see Bob giving a flower to Lulu, they assume that the two of them are in love and decide to play matchmaker. They doll up Lulu and set her up on a date with Bob. The rest of the Leptons apparently had the same idea as they try to feed Bob advice. Things get out of hand as Gaz and Dee Dee try to shift to different venues so that the two of them can establish a romance. Upon seeing Gaz and Dee Dee working closely with one another, Leto begins to assume that the two are in a relationship. Eventually, Lulu gets tired of listening to Gaz and Dee Dee's advice, as well as their arguments, and decides to be herself resulting in gaining an audience and accidentally destroying a club. Later, Gaz and Dee Dee realize that Bob was just returning the flower to Lulu after she dropped it. They then decide to spy on Bob instead.
| 18 | 8 | "Dance Dance Convolution?! Egos Warped by the Hair Gel of Hubris! Atonement, Now!!" | Christy Karacas, Adam Modiano & Andrew Reuland | Ronnie Lu, Miyako Molinelli & Christy Karacas | March 16, 2020 | 0.524 |
The Leptons are approached by Milky van Montebag, a flashy manager who offers to pay them. He begins putting emphasis on Ace for his innocent appearance and soon Ace-mania begins taking the Consortium by storm. The rest of the Leptons become annoyed as Ace's newfound fame resulting in Gaz confronting him. She reveals that she was once part of a wealthy family and joined the Game to find excitement. Managers took advantage of her and she spiraled into drugs, resulting in her going to rehab and leading to what became of her today; a change she is actually proud of. Ace ignores her and the Leptons kidnap him and follow Milky to a sweat house full of workers made up of Lulu's species. The Leptons battle Milky and his robots and free the workers. However, Ace still has strong feelings for his fame, much to the annoyance of the team.
| 19 | 9 | "Don't Let a Big Head Give You the Championship Blues! You Can Do It, Leptons! Try Your Best to Win!!" | Adam Modiano | Ronnie Lu, Miyako Molinelli, Christy Karacas & Seth Brady | March 23, 2020 | 0.529 |
The Leptons prepare to go up against Bad Omen, a demonic team in the big finals. Ace, still overly confidant and egotistical, declares that he can defeat the team on his own as Ballmaster which everyone agrees to as the rival team comes off as intimidating and scary. Gaz is none too proud of Ace's behaviour, but the team comes together on game day. Most of the Leptons are wiped out, but Ace and Babyball become Ballmaster and wipe out the other players, but he becomes enraged at Gaz and begins attacking her. Crayzar mentally speaks to Gaz to take up her role as leader and she and Ace attack, resulting in him severely injuring her. He comes to his senses and together they are able to defeat Bad Omen's leader Vorelord and win the Game 2-1. As the Leptons celebrate their newfound victory and glory, Crayzar is pleased with Gaz and Ballmaster.
| 20 | 10 | "Onward, True Blue Friends Win Eternal; Paladin of the Heavens, Start Today!" | Andrew Reuland | Ronnie Lu, Miyako Molinelli & Christy Karacas | March 23, 2020 | 0.426 |
The Leptons are given the grand trophy by Crayzar who makes Ballmaster MVP, though Ace credits Gaz for being his inspiration. Gaz is confronted by her estranged father Rupert T. Digzfield IV, who wants her to return to the family business; having bought the Leptons when she joined and threatens to break the team-up. Six months later, Gaz is pampered by her family, though she takes the time to still watch the Leptons who are still winning games. Suddenly, the city is attacked by aliens and Crayzar reveals that the Game was not just to keep the peace, but also to train warriors who will defend Earth and the galaxy from invaders. Gaz leaves home, with her father getting killed by the aliens, and races back to the city where she happily reunites with the Leptons. The city is revealed to be a ship and Crazyar takes the Leptons and the other teams into space.

=== Ballmastrz: Rubicon (2023) ===
| No. overall | No. in season | Title | Written by | Co-storyboarded by | Original release date | US viewers (millions) |
|---|---|---|---|---|---|---|
| 21 | 1 | "Ballmastrz: Rubicon" | Andrew Reuland & Christy Karacas | Vironica Liu | February 20, 2023 (Note: The special was made available on HBO Max ahead of its broadcast premiere, where it is considered the 11th episode of season 2.) | 0.146 |
While on a mission in space, spaceship Cosmic Super Fortress Gold Diamond is invaded by an unknown threat, revealed as Tyetaynus the Conqueror, who sends Crayzar to Demon Saytar. It is discovered that Crayzar lied to all of humanity via The Game, and by doing so he went against his family’s mission to find the Cosmo Diary. He is convicted of being guilty and is stripped of his powers. Tyetaynus offers Crayzar the chance to have his powers returned by destroying Earth as proof that he's learned his lesson. As a result of the discovery of Crayzar’s dark truth, all the teams in The Game turn their backs on him and begin fighting each other over the ship’s escape pods, including Gaz’s teammates. Babyball reminds Crayzar of how much he was still able to accomplish and the two of them work together to send a message to Gaz, informing her of the whereabouts of Gold Diamond’s secret weapon. They are able to find it, but get surrounded by soldiers of Tyetaynus’s army before they can activate it. Tyetaynus unveils the Quietus Wave Disruptor, and commands Crayzar to activate it and destroy Earth. He tries to convince him otherwise, and apologizes to the players of The Game, explaining that he created The Game to maintain human unity and that his love of Earth prevents him from ever being able to destroy it. Tyetaynus attacks Crayzar, only to be attacked by Gaz, who has activated the Savage Angel and overcomes Tyetaynus’s mech suit with the help of Ballmastr, who returns Crayzar’s powers. Everyone returns to Gold Diamond to try and head back home, but Tyetaynus still manages to activate the Wave Disruptor, but before the laser is able to fire, his ship is attacked and sucked up by a Necro Mammoth, an extreme threat to the universe. As for Tyetaynus himself, he is plunged through the deep, dark, depths of outer space. Believing that Crayzar’s intended journey still holds weight to itself, the Leptons embark on an odyssey to find the Cosmo Diary.

== Production ==
=== Development ===
Around 2014, Karacas began working on the show. On May 7, 2015, it was announced that Adult Swim had given a pilot order to the production as part of their 2015-16 slate of returning series, pilots and specials. The pilot would become Ballmastrz: 9009. On August 4, 2017, it was announced that Adult Swim had given the production a series order consisting of the first season. The series was created by Christy Karacas, co-creator of Superjail! and produced by animation company Titmouse, Inc.

=== Animation ===
The series is animated with Adobe Animate and produced by a team of around 20 animators from Titmouse, Inc. offices in New York City. When the animators were discussing the artistic direction of the series, Titmouse president and producer Chris Prynoski described the show's animation style as appearing "like it was drawn by High School kids who try to draw anime".

For the Ballmastrz: Rubicon special, the animation team was changed to Studio 4°C. Karacas stated that the decision was done as he wanted the special to "dive into the actual anime world." As a result, the special features a new art style.

=== Casting ===
Alongside the initial series announcement, it was reported that Natasha Lyonne was cast in the series' lead role of Gaz Digzy. The main cast was also set to be rounded out by Dana Snyder, Dave Willis, Jessica DiCicco, Eric Bauza, Christopher McCulloch, and Karacas. Guests were set to include Norman Reedus, Stephanie Sheh, and Mike O'Gorman.

== Marketing ==
Alongside the initial series announcement, Adult Swim released the first official trailer for the series.

On February 22, 2020, Adult Swim hosted an event at the Plaza Theatre in Atlanta, dedicated to the premiere of the second season of the series. During the event, 5 unreleased episodes were broadcast followed by a Q&A with creator Christy Karacas and voice actors Dana Snyder and Dave Willis.

== Reception ==
The series has received positive reviews from critics. Daniel Kurland of Den of Geek described the series by saying that it "feels like a computer did a speedball and the finished product is a disorienting, glitched-out drug overdose." Sean Shuman of MovieWeb said that the series has a simple premise, hyper-stylization, and genuine character, stating that the series is "a show that feels like an ancient anime ripped out from a classic VHS tape, touched up with a modern aesthetic, and then trimmed down to eleven minutes."
