= Christy Karacas =

American animator

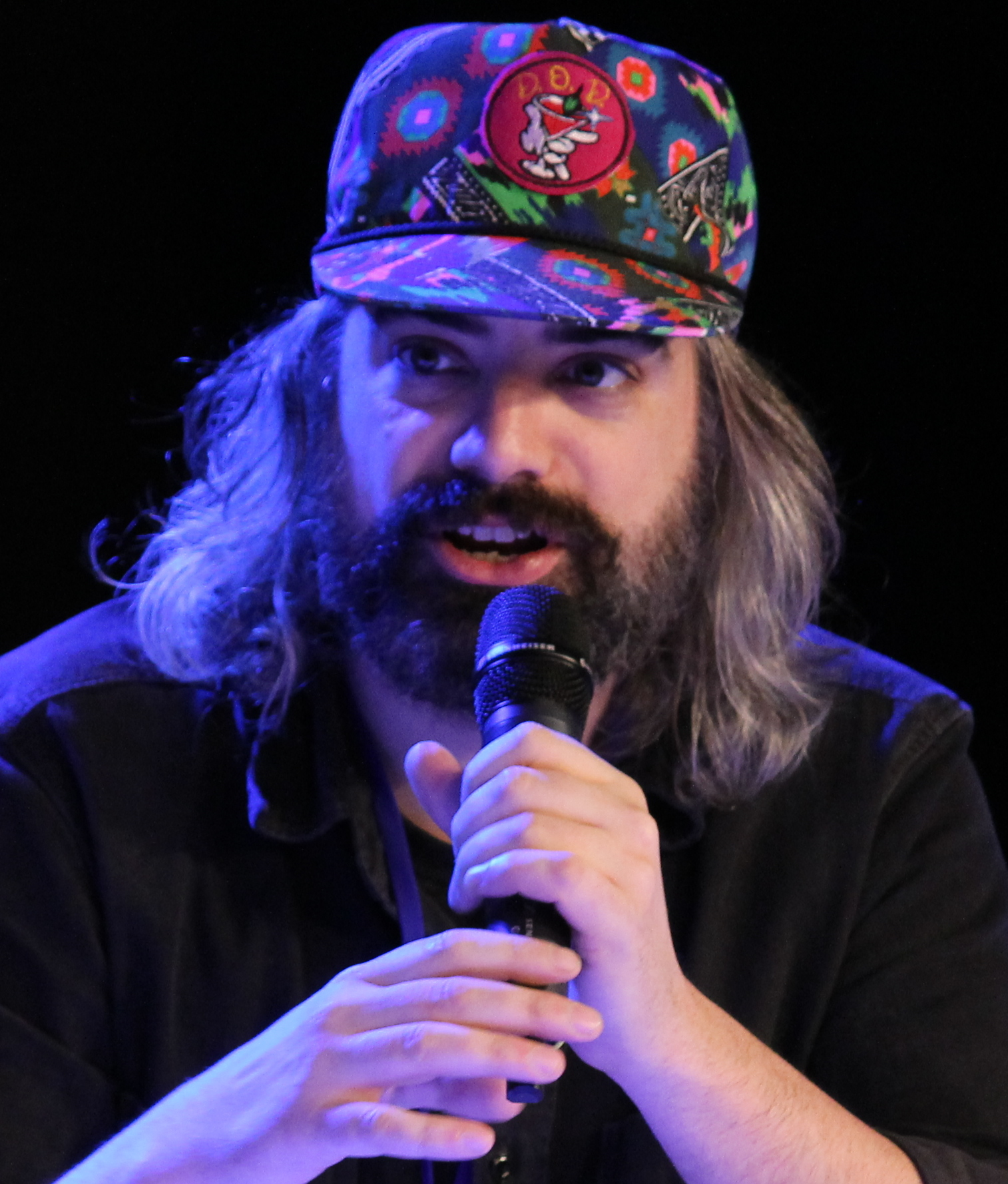
- Karacas at the Magic City Comic Con in 2015
- Born: Christy C. Karacas; New Hampshire, U.S.
- Education: Rhode Island School of Design (BFA)
- Occupations: Animator, writer, producer, director, voice actor, musician
- Years active: 1997–present
- Known for: Superjail! Robotomy; Ballmastrz: 9009

Christy C. Karacas is an American animator, writer, producer, director, voice actor and musician. He is known for creating Superjail!, Ballmastrz: 9009, and Robotomy for Cartoon Network, the former two for its programming block Adult Swim. He is also a guitarist of the rock band Cheeseburger.

== Life and career ==
As a child, Karacas frequently drew, with inspiration from comic book superheroes and Star Wars characters to Family Feud scenarios, often with violent themes (though Karacas has explained that he in actuality is "a very non-confrontational person"). Karacas went on to study film and animation at the Rhode Island School of Design, though he wanted to originally get into live action material. For his senior film project, Karacas created the student film Space War, which raised his profile via showings at animation festivals. He graduated in 1997 with a BFA.

Karacas began his career in the animation industry at MTV Animation, where he served as a background designer for Daria. He is a founding member and guitar player for the band Cheeseburger, and he also worked with title sequences, animation, and illustration for VBS.tv and Vice magazine. While working on Daria, around 2001, Karacas and friend Stephen Warbrick created the short film Barfight and presented it for showing at numerous film festivals, though it was rejected at all of them. Dispirited, Karacas spent time working on his band. Several years later, Barfight caught the attention of Adult Swim, who allowed them and Ben Gruber to create a show of their own called Superjail!.

Superjail! was originally animated by Augenblick Studios in the pilot episode and first season, but was later animated by Titmouse, Inc. from seasons two to four. However, the series ended its run in 2014. While working on Superjail!, Karacas worked on several other projects, including directing the short-lived Cartoon Network animated series Robotomy, which ran from 2010 to 2011, and writing new material with his bandmates of Cheeseburger.

After Superjail!, Karacas moved on to create another show for Adult Swim, titled Ballmastrz: 9009, which premiered in 2018. The show was renewed for a second season, which began airing February 23, 2020.

=== Influences ===
Karacas' influences include Max Fleischer, Tex Avery, Bob Clampett, John Kricfalusi, Chuck Jones, Matt Groening, Robert Crumb, Mike Judge, and Dr. Seuss. He also included references from Jim Henson's The Muppets, Paul Reubens' Pee-Wee Herman, Monty Python, Mad Magazine and The Three Stooges.

== Filmography ==
Karacas is notable for the following:

- Space War (1997)
- Daria (1997–2002) - Background designer
- Life (1999) - Animator
- Bar Fight (2006)
- Superjail! (2007; 2008–2014) - Co-creator, writer, executive producer, storyboard artist, director, voice actor, character layout artist, assistant animator, animator
- Robotomy (2010–2011) - Co-executive producer, creative director, director
- Out of the Black (2013) - Animator, co-director
- Moonbeam City (2015)
- Nerdland (2016) - Sequence animator: Video XV
- Squidbillies (2017) - Storyboard artist
- Ballmastrz: 9009 (2018–2023)
- Your Pretty Face is Going to Hell (2022) - Animated segments
- Baby Shark's Big Show! (2022) - Storyboard artist
- King Star King !/!/!/ (2023) - Storyboard consultant
- Ballmastrz: Rubicon (2023)
- The Day the Earth Blew Up: A Looney Tunes Movie (2024) - Visual development
