= Soft Cell discography =

- Studio albums: 7
- Extended plays: 3
- Live albums: 5
- Compilation albums: 15
- Singles: 29
- Video albums: 3
- Music videos: 23
- Remix albums: 2

This is the discography of Soft Cell, a British synth-pop duo consisting of Marc Almond and Dave Ball who rose to prominence in the early 1980s. The duo broke up in 1984 after releasing four albums, but reunited in the early 2000s for a series of live dates and released an album of new material in 2002. The group reunited again in 2018 for a supposedly farewell UK concert accompanied by a host of musical and video releases, including a career-spanning box set and a single., but subsequently changed their minds and played several further gigs and festival spots in the UK. This reunion spawned a new album and a slew of singles, with a new album due in 2026.

== Albums ==
=== Studio albums ===
Title	Album details	Peak chart positions										Certifications
Title	Album details	UK	AUS	CAN	FIN	GER	NED	NZ	SWE	US	US R&B/HH	Certifications
Non-Stop Erotic Cabaret	Released: 27 November 1981; Label: Some Bizzare (#BIZ2); Formats: LP, CS, CD	5	34	2	19	23	—	7	25	22	55	BPI: Platinum; MC: Platinum; RMNZ: Gold
The Art of Falling Apart	Released: 14 January 1983; Label: Some Bizzare (#BIZ3); Formats: LP, CS, CD	5	—	82	—	—	43	—	—	84	—	BPI: Gold
This Last Night in Sodom	Released: 16 March 1984; Label: Some Bizzare (#BIZ6); Formats: LP, CS, CD	12	—	—	—	—	—	—	—	—	—	
Cruelty Without Beauty	Released: 8 October 2002; Label: Cooking Vinyl (#COOK245); Formats: CS, CD	116	—	—	—	—	—	—	—	—	—	
Happiness Not Included	Released: 6 May 2022; Label: BMG; Formats: LP, CS, CD, digital download	7	—	—	—	12	—	—	—	—	—	
Danceteria	Released: 25 September 2026; Label: Republic of Music; Formats: LP, CS, CD, digital download	26	—	—	—	—	—	—	—	—	—	
"—" denotes items that did not chart or were not released in that territory.

=== Remix albums ===
Title	Album details	Peak chart positions			Certifications
Title	Album details	UK	US	US Dance Club	Certifications
Non Stop Ecstatic Dancing	Released: June 1982; Label: Some Bizzare (#BIZ6); Formats: LP, CS, CD	6	57	31	BPI: Gold
Heat: The Remixes	Released: 15 September 2008; Label: Some Bizzare, Mercury, UMC; Formats: 2xCD, digital download	—	—	—	

=== Live albums ===
Title	Album details	Peak chart positions				Additional Information
Title	Album details	UK	UK Indie	UK Vinyl	SCO	Additional Information
Live	Released: 7 October 2003; Label: Cooking Vinyl (#COOKCD267); Formats: CD	—	—	—	—	2003 European tour; Includes recordings from Leeds, London and Brussels; 26-track, double CD album
Soft Cell at the BBC	Released: 14 October 2003; Label: Strange Fruit (#SFRSCD123); Formats: CD	—	—	—	—	Live sessions in 1981–1983; Includes multimedia tracks from The Old Grey Whistle Test; 10-track album of BBC recordings
Say Hello, Wave Goodbye: Live	Released: 27 June 2005; Label: Demon Music Group (#MCCD573); Formats: CD	—	—	—	—	Re-issue of Live album from 2003; With new title and artwork; 26-track, double CD album
Say Hello, Wave Goodbye – 2018	Released: 1 August 2019; Label: Live Here Now (#LHN052); Formats: LP, CD, digital download	95	11	18	38	Live at the O2, 30 September 2018; 4×LP and 2×CD box sets; Available with DVD and Blu-ray discs
Non-Stop Erotic Cabaret & Other Stories	Released: 7 October 2022; Label: Live Here Now; Formats: LP, CD, DVD, Blu-ray, digital download	—	—	—	—	Live in London, November 2021; 2×CD set, plus various vinyl, DVD & Blu-ray packages; Available with DVD and Blu-ray discs

=== Compilation albums ===
Charting compilations

Title	Album details	Peak chart positions					Certifications
Title	Album details	UK	BEL	EUR	GER	SCO	Certifications
The Singles	Released: 13 December 1986; Label: Some Bizzare (#BIZ3); Formats: LP, CS, CD	58	—	—	54	—	
Memorabilia – The Singles	Released: 20 May 1991; Label: Mercury (#8485121); Formats: LP, CS, CD	8	—	40	—	—	
The Very Best of Soft Cell	Released: 1 April 2002; Label: UMTV (#5868342); Formats: CD	37	—	—	—	63	BPI: Gold
Hits & Pieces: The Best of Marc Almond and Soft Cell	Released: 10 March 2017; Label: Universal (#5737778); Formats: LP, CD	7	134	—	—	5	
Keychains & Snowstorms – The Soft Cell Story	Released: 7 September 2018; Label: Universal (#6741996); Formats: CD	56	—	—	80	36	
Keychains & Snowstorms – The Singles	Released: 28 September 2018; Label: Universal (#6779852); Formats: CD	34	—	—	—	30	
Non-Stop Extended Cabaret (Note: "Non-Stop Extended Cabaret" was released in the United Kingdom as a limited-edition 2x LP compilation for Record Store Day.)	Released: 20 April 2024; Label: EMI (#5880199), Universal (#00602458801996), Mercury (#5880199); Formats: 2xLP	— (Note: "Non-Stop Extended Cabaret" did not enter the UK Albums chart, but peaked at number 71 on the UK Physical Albums chart and at number 76 on the UK Albums Sales chart)	—	—	—	—	
"—" denotes items that did not chart or were not released in that territory.

Additional compilations

- 1982 – The Twelve Inch Singles (Some Bizzare) (6x12" vinyl boxset with booklet)
- 1994 – Down in the Subway (Spectrum)
- 1996 – Say Hello to Soft Cell (Spectrum)
- 1998 – Master Series (Mercury)
- 2001 – The Twelve Inch Singles (PolyGram) (3CD re-release of the 1982 boxset with additional material)
- 2005 – The Bedsit Tapes (Some Bizzare) (Recorded in 1978–1980)
- 2006 – Demo Non Stop (Some Bizzare) (Recorded in 1978–1980)
- 2006 – 20th Century Masters – The Millennium Collection: The Best of Soft Cell (Universal)

== Extended plays ==
Title	Details
Mutant Moments	Released: 1980; Label: Big Frock
Club Mixes 2018	Released: 2018; Label: Big Frock
Magick Mutants	Released: 2019; Label: Big Frock

== Singles ==
Year	Title	Peak chart positions											Certifications	Album
Year	Title	UK	AUS	BEL	CAN	FIN	GER	IRE	NED	SWE	US	US Dance Club	Certifications	Album
1981	"A Man Could Get Lost"	—	—	—	—	—	—	—	—	—	—	—		Non-album singles
1981	"Memorabilia"	— (Note: "Memorabilia" did not enter the UK Singles chart, but peaked at number 15 on the UK Vinyl Singles chart and at number 18 on the UK Physical Singles chart.)	—	—	—	—	—	—	—	—	—	35		Non-album singles
1981	"Tainted Love"/ "Where Did Our Love Go"	1	1	1	1	—	1	4	7	2	8	4	BPI: 4× Platinum; ARIA: Gold; BVMI: Gold; MC: Platinum; RMNZ: 2× Platinum	Non-Stop Erotic Cabaret
1981	"Bedsitter"	4	—	33	—	29	—	10	—	—	—	—	BPI: Silver	Non-Stop Erotic Cabaret
1982	"Say Hello, Wave Goodbye"	3	—	36	—	—	29	12	30	—	—	—	BPI: Silver	Non-Stop Erotic Cabaret
1982	"Torch"	2	68	6	—	9	75	7	12	—	—	—	BPI: Silver	Non-album single
1982	"What!"	3	—	32	—	—	64	6	—	—	– (Note: "What" did not enter the US Billboard Hot 100, but peaked at number 1 on the Billboard Bubbling Under Hot 100 extension chart.)	—	BPI: Silver	Non-Stop Ecstatic Dancing
1982	"Where the Heart Is"	21	—	—	—	23	—	14	—	—	—	—		The Art of Falling Apart
1982	"Loving You, Hating Me" (North America-only release)	—	—	—	—	—	—	—	—	—	—	—		The Art of Falling Apart
1983	"Numbers"/"Barriers"	25	—	—	—	—	—	16	—	—	—	—		The Art of Falling Apart
1983	"Heat" (North America-only release)	—	—	—	—	—	—	—	—	—	—	—		The Art of Falling Apart
1983	"Soul Inside"	16	—	—	—	—	—	13	—	—	—	—		This Last Night in Sodom
1984	"Down in the Subway"	24	—	—	—	—	—	20	—	—	—	—		This Last Night in Sodom
1985	"Tainted Love" (re-issue)	43	—	—	—	—	—	—	—	—	—	—		Non-album single
1991	"Say Hello, Wave Goodbye '91" (featuring Marc Almond)	38	—	—	—	—	—	—	—	—	—	—		Memorabilia – The Singles
1991	"Tainted Love '91" (featuring Marc Almond)	5	93	—	—	—	22	4	—	—	—	—		Memorabilia – The Singles
1999	"Tainted Love" (vs Club 69)	—	—	—	—	—	—	—	—	—	— (Note: "Tainted Love (Soft Cell vs. Club 69)" did not enter the US Billboard Hot 100, but peaked at number 6 on the Billboard Dance Singles Sales chart.)	24		Non-album single
2002	"Monoculture"	52	—	—	—	—	—	—	—	—	—	—		Cruelty Without Beauty
2003	"The Night"	39	—	—	—	—	—	—	—	—	—	—		Cruelty Without Beauty
2016	"Sex Dwarf" (Note: "Sex Dwarf" was released in the United Kingdom as a limited-edition twelve-inch vinyl single for Record Store Day.)	— (Note: "Sex Dwarf" did not enter the UK Singles chart, but peaked at number 11 on the UK Vinyl Singles chart and at number 14 on the UK Physical Singles chart.)	—	—	—	—	—	—	—	—	—	—		Non-Stop Erotic Cabaret
2018	"Northern Lights"/ "Guilty (Cos I Say You Are)"	— (Note: "Northern Lights" did not enter the UK Singles chart, but peaked at number 2 on the UK Physical Singles chart and UK Vinyl Singles chart and at number 37 on the UK Singles Sales chart.)	—	—	—	—	—	—	—	—	—	—		Keychains & Snowstorms: The Singles
2021	"Bruises on All My Illusions"	— (Note: "Bruises on All My Illusions" did not enter the UK Singles chart, but peaked at number 2 on the UK Physical Singles chart and UK Vinyl Singles chart and at number 60 on the UK Singles Sales chart.)	—	—	—	—	—	—	—	—	—	—		Happiness Not Included
2022	"Purple Zone" (with Pet Shop Boys)	— (Note: "Purple Zone" did not enter the UK Singles chart, but peaked at number 1 on the UK Physical Singles chart and UK Vinyl Singles chart, at number 9 on the UK Singles Sales chart and at number 11 on the UK Singles Downloads chart.)	—	—	—	—	—	—	—	—	—	—		Happiness Not Included
2022	"Nostalgia Machine"	— (Note: "Nostalgia Machine" did not enter the UK Singles chart, but peaked at number 6 on the UK Physical Singles chart, at number 9 on the UK Vinyl Singles chart and at number 30 on the UK Singles Sales chart.)	—	—	—	—	—	—	—	—	—	—		Happiness Not Included
2022	"Light Sleepers" / "Last Chance"	— (Note: "Light Sleepers" did not enter the UK Singles chart, but peaked at number 17 on the UK Physical Singles chart and UK Vinyl Singles chart and at number 43 on the UK Singles Sales chart.)	—	—	—	—	—	—	—	—	—	—		Happiness Not Included / Cruelty Without Beauty
2022	"Light Sleepers" / "Last Chance"	— (Note: "Last Chance (Christmas Mix)" did not enter the UK Singles chart, but peaked at number 3 on the UK Physical Singles chart and at number 34 on the UK Singles Sales chart.)	—	—	—	—	—	—	—	—	—	—		Happiness Not Included / Cruelty Without Beauty
2024	"Light Sleepers" (Christmas Mix) / "First Hand Experience in Second Hand Love"	—	—	—	—	—	—	—	—	—	—	—		
2025	"First Hand Experience in Second Hand Love" (Remixes)	—	—	—	—	—	—	—	—	—	—	—		
2025	"Martin" (Remixes)	—	—	—	—	—	—	—	—	—	—			
2026	"Out Come the Freaks"	—	—	—	—	—	—	—	—	—	—	—		Danceteria
"—" denotes items that did not chart or were not released in that territory.

Promotional singles

- 1981 – "Sex Dwarf/Entertain Me/Seedy Films" (US Dance #65)
- 1982 – "What/Insecure...Me?"
- 1984 – Songs from The Last Night in Sodom

== Video albums ==
Year	Title	Format	Additional information
1982	Soft Cell's Non-Stop Exotic Video Show: Released: 1982; Label: Some Bizzare Films	VHS	Reissued on DVD in 2004, and included on the Keychains & Snowstorms Boxset DVD disc
1991	Memorabilia – The Video Singles: Released: 1991; Label: Polygram	VHS	Soft Cell with Marc Almond – video compilation released alongside the 1991 compilation album of the same name
2002	Live in Milan: Released: 2002; Label: Eagle Vision USA	DVD	

== Music videos ==
Year	Title	Director	Additional information
1981	Tainted Love	Tim Pope	Released on Soft Cell's Non-Stop Exotic Video Show and Keychains & Snowstorms Boxset
1981	Bedsitter	Tim Pope	Released on Soft Cell's Non-Stop Exotic Video Show and Memorabilia – The Video Singles and Keychains & Snowstorms Boxset
1981	Say Hello, Wave Goodbye	Tim Pope	Released on Soft Cell's Non-Stop Exotic Video Show and Keychains & Snowstorms Boxset
1982	Torch	Tim Pope	Released on Soft Cell's Non-Stop Exotic Video Show and Memorabilia – The Video Singles and Keychains & Snowstorms Boxset
1982	What!	Tim Pope	Released on Soft Cell's Non-Stop Exotic Video Show and Memorabilia – The Video Singles and Keychains & Snowstorms Boxset
1982	Entertain Me	Tim Pope	Released on Soft Cell's Non-Stop Exotic Video Show and Keychains & Snowstorms Boxset
1982	Frustration	Tim Pope	Released on Soft Cell's Non-Stop Exotic Video Show and Keychains & Snowstorms Boxset
1982	Seedy Films	Tim Pope	Released on Soft Cell's Non-Stop Exotic Video Show and Keychains & Snowstorms Boxset
1982	Secret Life	Tim Pope	Released on Soft Cell's Non-Stop Exotic Video Show and Keychains & Snowstorms Boxset
1982	Youth	Tim Pope	Released on Soft Cell's Non-Stop Exotic Video Show and Keychains & Snowstorms Boxset
1982	Memorabilia	Tim Pope	Released on Soft Cell's Non-Stop Exotic Video Show and Memorabilia – The Video Singles and Keychains & Snowstorms Boxset
1982	Sex Dwarf (Intro)	Tim Pope	Released on Soft Cell's Non-Stop Exotic Video Show and Keychains & Snowstorms Boxset
1982	Sex Dwarf	Tim Pope	Original, banned version that has yet to be officially released
1983	Where The Heart Is	Tim Pope	Released on Memorabilia – The Video Singles and Keychains & Snowstorms Boxset
1983	Numbers	Tim Pope	Released on Memorabilia – The Video Singles and Keychains & Snowstorms Boxset
1983	Soul Inside	Tim Pope	Released on Memorabilia – The Video Singles and Keychains & Snowstorms Boxset
1984	Down in the Subway	Tim Pope	Released on Keychains & Snowstorms Boxset
1991	Say Hello, Wave Goodbye '91	Peter Christopherson	Released on Memorabilia – The Video Singles and Keychains & Snowstorms Boxset
1991	Tainted Love '91	Peter Christopherson	Released on Memorabilia – The Video Singles and Keychains & Snowstorms Boxset
2002	Monoculture	Tim Pope	Included as a multimedia track on the Monoculture single and Keychains & Snowstorms Boxset
2018	Northern Lights	Tim Pope	Included as a multimedia track on the Northern Lights single and Keychains & Snowstorms Boxset
2022	Purple Zone	Yassa Khan	Soft Cell & Pet Shop Boys Single
2022	Light Sleepers	Charlie Ann Max	

== Rarities and miscellaneous ==
Year	Title	Label	Additional information
1981	Some Bizzare Album	Some Bizzare	Compilation featuring exclusive track "The Girl with the Patent Leather Face."
1982	Metro MRX	Flexi	1982 green flexi-disc free with Flexi-Pop magazine.
1983	Ghostrider – Live '83	Cellmates	Flexi-disc of a live cover of the song Ghost Rider by Suicide. Available in black, blue, or green and issued by the Soft Cell fan club.
1991	Bedsitter '91 / Torch		Withdrawn UK promotional 7" & 12" single, originally intended to be the 3rd single release from the 1991 compilation 'Memorabilia'. Credited to Soft Cell / Marc Almond.
2001	I'd Rather Shout at a Returning Echo than Kid That Someone's Listening	Some Bizzare	Compilation that includes the track "God-Shaped Hole."
2016	Sex Dwarf	UMC	12" Vinyl UK Record Store Day 2016. Contains the 3 existing (At the time) remixes of the song.
2018	Say Hello Wave Goodbye / Youth	UMC/Mercury	12" Vinyl UK Record Store Day 2018 First Release limited to 1,500 copies, containing new mixes by Dave Ball: Say Hello Wave Goodbye (Dave Ball Lateral Mix) & Youth (Dave Ball Wasted on the Young Mix)
2018	Night and the City (And You) & One Last Time		Exclusive Tracks contained on limited edition 'Keychains & Snowstorms' USB Stick.
2020	Cruelty Without Beauty 2020 Extended Mixes		Limited to 500 copies in a PVC sleeve with sticker.
2025	Happiness Now Completed		2025 Record Store Day release (12 April). Limited to 1000 copies. Includes the previously unreleased track: "Kill Shot".
