= The Very Best of Soft Cell =

Greatest hits album by Soft Cell
- Released: 16 April 2002
- Genre: Synth-pop
- Length: 79:30
- Labels: Mercury; Universal Music TV; Some Bizzare
- Producers: David James Ball; Daniel Miller; Soft Cell; Mike Thorne; Ingo Vauk

Soft Cell chronology
Say Hello to Soft Cell (1996)	The Very Best of Soft Cell (2002)	Cruelty Without Beauty (2002)

Professional ratings
Review scores
Source	Rating
AllMusic	4.5/5 stars

The Very Best of Soft Cell is a greatest hits album by English synth-pop duo Soft Cell. It was released on 16 April 2002 by Mercury Records, Universal Music TV and Some Bizzare Records. The album includes most of the duo's singles, as well as B-sides, such as "Insecure Me" (in a newly edited version) and "It's a Mug's Game". The song "Numbers" was considerably shortened for this release, while its AA side "Barriers" was omitted. Two new songs, "Somebody, Somewhere, Sometime" and "Divided Soul", and two brand-new remixes of "Tainted Love" and "Say Hello, Wave Goodbye" were also included. The album reached number 37 on the UK Albums Chart.

== Track listing ==
All tracks are written by Marc Almond and David James Ball, except where noted.

No.	Title	Writer(s)	Length
1.	"Memorabilia"		4:51
2.	"Tainted Love" (7″ version)	Edward B. Cobb	2:42
3.	"Where Did Our Love Go?"	Edward Holland Jr.; Brian Holland; Lamont Dozier	3:11
4.	"Bedsitter" (7″ version)		3:39
5.	"Say Hello, Wave Goodbye"		5:27
6.	"Sex Dwarf"		5:18
7.	"Torch"		4:09
8.	"Insecure Me" (2002 edit)		3:13
9.	"What?"	H.B. Barnum	4:35
10.	"Where the Heart Is"		4:35
11.	"It's a Mugs Game" (7″ version)		5:27
12.	"Numbers" (2002 edit)		3:34
13.	"Loving You Hating Me" (remix)		4:31
14.	"Soul Inside"		4:31
15.	"Down in the Subway"	Jack Hammer	3:28
16.	"Somebody, Somewhere, Sometime"		4:11
17.	"Divided Soul"	Almond; Ball; Ingo Vauk	4:05
18.	"Tainted Love" (2XS remix; 2002 remix)	Cobb	3:19
19.	"Say Hello, Wave Goodbye" (Almighty radio edit; 2002 remix)		4:33

== Personnel ==
Credits adapted from the liner notes of The Very Best of Soft Cell.

=== Soft Cell ===
- Marc Almond – vocals, percussion
- David James Ball – synthesisers, guitars

=== Technical ===
- Daniel Miller – production (track 1)
- Mike Thorne – production (tracks 2–13, 18, 19)
- Soft Cell – production (track 12, 14, 15)
- David James Ball – production (track 16, 17); remix (track 12)
- Ingo Vauk – production (track 16, 17)
- Paul Hardiman – engineering (track 2)
- Flood – remix assistance (track 12)
- Damien Mendis – remix production, remix performance (track 18)
- Stuart Bradbury – remix production, remix performance (track 18)
- Almighty Associates – remix (track 19)

=== Artwork ===
- Peter Ashworth – all band photography
- Peacock – design
- Stephen Dalton – sleeve notes

== Charts ==
Chart (2002)	Peak position
Scottish Albums (Official Charts)	63
UK Albums (Official Charts)	37

== Certifications ==
Region	Certification	Certified units/sales
United Kingdom (BPI)	Gold	100,000^{‡}
^{‡} Sales+streaming figures based on certification alone.
