= Non Stop Ecstatic Dancing =

1982 remix by Soft Cell

Remix album by Soft Cell
- Released: June 1982
- Recorded: 1982
- Genres: Synth-pop; dance; disco
- Length: 27:53
- Label: Some Bizzare
- Producer: Mike Thorne

Soft Cell chronology
Non-Stop Erotic Cabaret (1981)	Non Stop Ecstatic Dancing (1982)	The Twelve Inch Singles (1982)

Singles from Non-Stop Ecstatic Dancing
- 1. "What" Released: August 1982

Non Stop Ecstatic Dancing is a 'mini' or 'remix' album by English synth-pop duo Soft Cell, released in the United Kingdom in June 1982, by Some Bizzare Records. In addition to remixes of the group's older material, it included a brand-new track, a cover of Judy Street's 1966 song "What", which reached number three on the UK Singles Chart. In some territories the album was released as an EP.

As the name implies, Non Stop Ecstatic Dancing was conceived, by the band's own admission, under the influence of MDMA (commonly referred to as ecstasy). Vocalist Marc Almond later stated in an interview with journalist Simon Tebbutt that both the album's sound and the sound of the band were influenced by his brief time working at The Warehouse, a well-known nightclub in Leeds.

The album is more dance-oriented than the group's first album Non-Stop Erotic Cabaret, with remixes and instrumental versions of two songs from its predecessor, and both sides of the Memorabilia single, as well as the new track "What". In the United Kingdom, this mini-LP format was just becoming prominent. Subsequent reissues would see the original mini-album length track listing bolstered with several extended versions of other Soft Cell material of the period.

Originally, the album was set to be produced by Donald Fagen of Steely Dan, and several tracks co-written by him were recorded, but those songs were shelved due to label disputes with MCA Records. The whole album had to be scrapped due to songwriting liabilities and Soft Cell famously had to write and record the album in the span of one week.

"[We] added a lot of different instruments and vocals. It's nice to be able to do that now, after a few months of the album being out so we can listen to the tracks and think of alternative ways of putting them over, to take songs and ideas through to various extremes."

— Marc Almond, 1982.

The band went on hiatus for a small period of time after the album's release, with David Ball taking time to reconcile with his girlfriend and Almond performing with Marc and the Mambas. This fuelled rumours that the band was splitting up, though they would release two more albums, The Art of Falling Apart (1983) and This Last Night in Sodom (1984).

The album was remastered and re-issued in 2025, on double CD and double vinyl, including a host of remixes.

== Reception ==
Professional ratings
Review scores
Source	Rating
AllMusic	4/5 stars
The Philadelphia Inquirer	1/5 stars
Smash Hits	6/10 stars

In a contemporary review, Ken Tucker of The Philadelphia Inquirer gave the release a one star rating out of five, declaring it "more sterile English dance music" and that the release was "more of the same junk. And I do mean same: Two of the cuts here are simply re-recorded versions of previously released material.

Among a number of positive reviews in 2025, Classic Pop Magazine rated the re-issue with a 4.5 out of 5 rating. The review emphasizes the album's connection to the club scene of the 1980s and its ability to capture the energy of iconic venues, and suggests that the album's sound remains relevant and exciting in 2025.

== Track listing ==
All tracks are written by David Ball and Marc Almond, except where noted.

UK and other European edition
No.	Title	Writer(s)	Length
1.	"Memorabilia"		5:22
2.	"Where Did Our Love Go"	Brian Holland; Lamont Dozier; Edward Holland Jr.	4:12
3.	"What"	H. B. Barnum	4:33
4.	"A Man Could Get Lost"		4:05
5.	"Chips on My Shoulder"		4:26
6.	"Sex Dwarf"		5:15
Total length:			27:53

1998 UK remastered CD bonus tracks
No.	Title	Writer(s)	Length
7.	"Tainted Love/Where Did Our Love Go" (extended)	Ed Cobb; B. Holland; Dozier; E. Holland	8:57
8.	"Memorabilia" (extended)		7:45
9.	"What!" (extended)	Barnum	6:11
10.	"So" (extended)	Ball	8:50
11.	"Torch" (extended)		8:30
12.	"Insecure Me" (extended)		8:15
Total length:			76:21

North American edition
No.	Title	Writer(s)	Length
1.	"Memorabilia"		5:22
2.	"Where Did Our Love Go"	B. Holland; Dozier; E. Holland	4:24
3.	"What"	Barnum	4:33
4.	"A Man Could Get Lost"		3:58
5.	"Insecure...Me?"		7:30
6.	"Sex Dwarf"		5:15
Total length:			31:02

=== Notes ===
- "Memorabilia" appears here as a brand-new version, with a rap by Cindy Ecstasy.
- "Where Did Our Love Go" is a remix of the B-side of "Tainted Love".
- "A Man Could Get Lost" and "Chips on My Shoulder" are heavily remixed instrumental versions.
- "Sex Dwarf" is also remixed, but is closer to the structure of the original song.
- The original North American vinyl release replaced "Chips on My Shoulder" with an edit of the extended version of "Insecure...Me?", while the 1999 CD reissue contains both tracks.

== Personnel ==
Credits adapted from the liner notes of Non Stop Ecstatic Dancing.

=== Soft Cell ===
- David Ball
- Marc Almond

=== Additional musicians ===
- Cindy Ecstasy – rap
- David Tofani – tenor saxophone
- John Gatchell – trumpet, flugelhorn

=== Technical ===
- Mike Thorne – production
- Don Wershba – engineering
- Nicky Kalliongis – engineering assistance
- Harvey Goldberg – mixing
- Jack Skinner – cutting engineer

=== Artwork ===
- Peter Ashworth – front photo
- Josh – back photo
- Huw Feather – design
- M.T. 9 – artwork

== Charts ==
Chart performance for Non Stop Ecstatic Dancing
Chart (1982)	Peak position
Dutch Albums (Album Top 100)	42
UK Albums (Official Charts)	6
US Billboard 200	57

== Certifications ==
Certifications for Non Stop Ecstatic Dancing
Region	Certification	Certified units/sales
United Kingdom (BPI)	Gold	100,000^{^}
^{^} Shipments figures based on certification alone.
