= The Twelve Inch Singles =

Compilation album by Soft Cell
- Released: December 1982
- Recorded: 1980–1984 (with later remixes)
- Genre: Synth-pop
- Label: Polygram

Soft Cell chronology
Non Stop Ecstatic Dancing (1982)	The Twelve Inch Singles (1982)	The Art of Falling Apart (1983)

Professional ratings
Review scores
Source	Rating
Allmusic	link

The Twelve Inch Singles is a compilation album by Soft Cell. The original 1982 release was as a vinyl box set containing the group's first six twelve inch single releases, along with an 8-page booklet. It was rereleased as an expanded three compact disc set in 1999, with a slightly revised version reissued in 2001.

== Track listing ==
CD1

1. "Memorabilia" – 7:39
2. "Persuasion" – 7:35
3. "Tainted Love/Where Did Our Love Go" – 8:57
4. "Tainted Dub" – 9:14
5. "Bedsitter" – 7:52
6. "Facility Girls" – 7:18
7. "Say Hello, Wave Goodbye" – 8:55
8. "Fun City" – 7:31

CD2

1. "Torch" – 8:29
2. "Insecure Me" – 8:17
3. "What!" – 6:10
4. "...So" – 8:51
5. "Where the Heart Is" – 9:45
6. "It's a Mug's Game" – 8:11
7. "Numbers" – 10:26
8. "Barriers" – 7:06

CD3

1. "Soul Inside" – 11:59
2. "Loving You, Hating Me" – 6:37
3. "You Only Live Twice" – 6:58
4. "007 Theme" – 3:35
5. "Her Imagination" – 5:21
6. "Down in the Subway" – 7:51
7. "Disease and Desire" – 4:04
8. "Born to Lose" – 2:55
9. "Memorabilia '91" (Extended Grid Remix) – 6:51
10. "Tainted Love '91" – 5:52
11. "Say Hello Wave Goodbye '91 (The Long Goodbye – Extended Mendelsohn Remix)" – 5:03
12. "Where the Heart Is '91" – 8:43

The original 1982 vinyl box set edition contained CD 1 and tracks 1–4 of CD 2.

== Notes ==
The US edition, released on Mercury Records in 1999, features an additional remix of Tainted Love (1999 Club 69 Future Mix) with a running time on 14:31. It was later withdrawn under pressure by Marc Almond who objected to the inclusion of this new remix.

All songs written by Marc Almond and David Ball unless otherwise noted.

- "Tainted Love/Where Did Our Love" composed by Ed Cobb, Lamont Dozier, Brian Holland and Edward Holland Jr.
- "Tainted Dub" composed by Ed Cobb, Lamont Dozier, Brian Holland and Edward Holland Jr.
- "Say Hello Wave Goodbye" performed by Soft Cell and David Tofani
- "What?" composed by H.B. Barnum
- "...So" composed by David Ball
- "You Only Live Twice" composed by John Barry and Leslie Bricusse
- "007 Theme" composed by John Barry
- "Down in the Subway" composed by Jack Hammer
- "Born to Lose" composed by Johnny Thunders
- "Tainted Love '91" composed by Ed Cobb
