= Live (Soft Cell album) =

Live album by Soft Cell
- Released: 7 October 2003
- Recorded: 2003
- Genres: Rock, synthpop, new wave
- Length: 62:12 (CD 1); 66:19 (CD 2)
- Labels: Cooking Vinyl; COOKCD267 / MCCD573
- Producers: Dave Ball, Ingo Vauk

Soft Cell chronology
Cruelty Without Beauty (2002)	Live (2003)	Soft Cell at the BBC (2003)

Alternative cover
- Say Hello, Wave Goodbye: Live 2005 reissue.

Live is a live album by Soft Cell. The album was released on 7 October 2003 and was recorded throughout Spring 2003 in Birmingham, Manchester, Leeds, London and Brussels during the group's tour in support of the album Cruelty Without Beauty.

Live was reissued on 27 June 2005 with the title Say Hello, Wave Goodbye: Live on the Music Club label (MCCD573). This edition featured completely new artwork, including alternative live photos and a new essay by Adam Woods of Music Week magazine.

== Track listing ==
CD 1

1. "Memorabilia" - 5:56
2. "Monoculture" - 3:55
3. "Le Grand Guignol" - 4:18
4. "Heat" - 5:05
5. "Caligula Syndrome" - 4:51
6. "Divided Soul" - 4:22
7. "Last Chance" - 4:34
8. "Barriers" - 5:28
9. "Youth" - 3:23
10. "Loving You, Hating Me" - 3:57
11. "Mr. Self Destruct" - 3:32
12. "The Best Way to Kill" - 5:23
13. "The Art of Falling Apart" - 7:19

CD 2

1. "Together Alone" - 5:34
2. "Somebody, Somewhere, Sometime" - 4:26
3. "Baby Doll" - 7:07
4. "The Night" - 4:24
5. "Soul Inside" - 4:31
6. "Torch" - 4:22
7. "Bedsitter" - 3:43
8. "Tainted Love" - 3:39
9. "Where Did Our Love Go?" - 5:33
10. "Martin" - 5:48
11. "Insecure Me" - 4:34
12. "Say Hello, Wave Goodbye" - 6:13
13. "Sex Dwarf" - 6:17

== Notes ==
All songs written by Marc Almond and David Ball except for:-

- "Divided Soul" composed by Marc Almond, David Ball and Ingo Vauk
- "The Night" composed by Bob Gaudio and Ruzika
- "Tainted Love" composed by Ed Cobb
- "Where Did Our Love Go?" composed by Lamont Dozier, Brian Holland and Edward Holland, Jr.
