= Say Hello to Soft Cell =

Compilation album by Soft Cell
- Released: 18 March 1996
- Genre: Synth-pop
- Length: 69:06
- Labels: Spectrum; 552 086-2

Soft Cell chronology
Down in the Subway (1994)	Say Hello to Soft Cell (1996)	The Very Best of Soft Cell (2002)

Professional ratings
Review scores
Source	Rating
Allmusic	3/5 stars

Say Hello to Soft Cell is a compilation album by Soft Cell. The album was released in 1996 by Spectrum and collects singles, album tracks and b-sides. It is also notable for the inclusion of "A Man Can Get Lost" (incorrectly titled as "A Man Could Get Lost" in the artwork), formerly previously available only on 7" vinyl single and (at the time) unavailable on CD, until subsequent releases corrected this. The four-page booklet contains a brief biography by Marc Almond.

The album was reissued in 1999 with different artwork that omitted the 'featuring Marc Almond' epithet but repeated the mistakes made regarding the track listing (see Notes).

== Track listing ==
1. "Say Hello, Wave Goodbye" - 5:23 (*)
2. "Torch" - 4:09
3. "Bedsitter" - 3:38
4. "You Only Live Twice" (John Barry, Leslie Bricusse) - 4:35
5. "Heat" - 6:14
6. "The Art of Falling Apart" - 5:03
7. "Facility Girls" - 2:24
8. "Born to Lose" (Johnny Thunders) - 2:57
9. "Sex Dwarf" - 5:22
10. "Disease and Desire" - 4:06
11. "Chips on My Shoulder" - 4:09
12. "Frustration" - 4:13
13. "Mr. Self Destruct" - 3:15
14. "Numbers" - 4:58
15. "Where Was Your Heart (When You Needed It Most)" - 5:11
16. "A Man Could Get Lost" - 3:18 (**)

== Notes ==
All songs written by Marc Almond and Dave Ball unless otherwise noted.

- (*) "Say Hello, Wave Goodbye" is actually the Julian Mendelsohn remix "Say Hello, Wave Goodbye '91".
- (**) As previously mentioned, "A Man Could Get Lost" is actually the early vocal version of this track entitled "A Man Can Get Lost".
