= Soft Cell's Non-Stop Exotic Video Show =

Video by Soft Cell
- Released: 1982; 26 July 2004 (DVD)
- Recorded: 1981–1982
- Genre: Synthpop
- Length: 55 Minutes
- Label: Picture Music International; Sanctuary Visual Entertainment (DVD)
- Director: Tim Pope
- Producer: A GLO Production for Some Bizzare

Professional ratings
Review scores
Source	Rating
DVD Times	6.0 / 10 (DVD)
AllMusic	3.5/5 stars
The Guardian	(DVD)

Soft Cell's Non-Stop Exotic Video Show is a video album by British synthpop duo Soft Cell. It is a companion release to their debut album, Non-Stop Erotic Cabaret. The collection was originally issued on VHS, Betamax and Laserdisc in 1982, and re-issued on DVD in 2004.

== Track listing ==
1. "Entertain Me"
2. "Bedsitter"
3. "Frustration"
4. "Torch"
5. "Seedy Films"
6. "Secret Life"
7. "Tainted Love"
8. "Youth"
9. "Memorabilia"
10. "Sex Dwarf"
11. "What"
12. "Say Hello, Wave Goodbye"
