= Memorabilia – The Singles =

Compilation album by Soft Cell and Marc Almond
- Released: 20 May 1991 (UK)
- Recorded: 1980–1991
- Genre: Synth-pop
- Label: Mercury
- Producer: Various

Soft Cell and Marc Almond chronology
The Singles (1986)	Memorabilia – The Singles (1991)	Down in the Subway (1994)

Marc Almond chronology
Enchanted (1990)	Memorabilia – The Singles (1991)	Tenement Symphony (1991)

Memorabilia – The Singles is a compilation album of songs by the British singer/songwriter Marc Almond, both as a solo artist and with his partner Dave Ball as the synth-pop duo Soft Cell. It was released in 1991 and reached number eight in the UK Albums Chart. The album was promoted by the singles "Say Hello, Wave Goodbye '91" and "Tainted Love '91".

The majority of the Soft Cell singles on this compilation are not the original versions and have new re-recorded vocals and some new musical recordings and remixing, with the exception of "Torch" and "Soul Inside".

The version of "Soul Inside" is unique to this recording, as is "Tears Run Rings", which is an edited version of the Justin Strauss remix.

The compilation was partly assembled by Stevo from Some Bizarre. While almost every Soft Cell single (to that date) was included in the package, the compilers opted to overlook all of Almond's solo and Mambas work up to 1988 except for his 1985 collaboration with Bronski Beat.

The compilation was released as an LP, CD, cassette and VHS video in May 1991. The artwork was designed by Big-Active Limited with a cover photograph by Richard Haughton.

== Track listing ==
=== LP ===
All tracks are written by D. Ball and M. Almond; except where indicated.

Side one
No.	Title	Writer(s)	Length
1.	"Memorabilia '91" (Soft Cell)		3:56
2.	"Tainted Love '91" (Soft Cell)	Ed Cobb	2:56
3.	"Bedsitter" (Soft Cell)		3:36
4.	"Torch" (Soft Cell)		4:07
5.	"What" (Soft Cell)	H.B. Barnum	3:08
6.	"Say Hello, Wave Goodbye '91" (Soft Cell)		5:20

Side two
No.	Title	Writer(s)	Length
7.	"Where the Heart Is '91" (Soft Cell)		4:32
8.	"I Feel Love (Medley)" (Jimmy Somerville with Bronski Beat featuring Marc Almond)	Moroder, Bellotte, Summer	5:47
9.	"Tears Run Rings" (Marc Almond)	M. Almond	5:40
10.	"A Lover Spurned" (Marc Almond)	M. Almond	5:38
11.	"Something's Gotten Hold of My Heart" (Marc Almond Featuring Gene Pitney)	Greenway, Cook	4:41

=== CD and cassette ===
All tracks are written by D. Ball and M. Almond; except where indicated.

No.	Title	Writer(s)	Length
1.	"Memorabilia '91" (Soft Cell)		3:56
2.	"Tainted Love '91" (Soft Cell)	Ed Cobb	2:56
3.	"Bedsitter" (Soft Cell)		3:36
4.	"Torch" (Soft Cell)		4:07
5.	"What" (Soft Cell)	H.B. Barnum	3:08
6.	"Say Hello, Wave Goodbye '91" (Soft Cell)		5:20
7.	"Soul Inside" (Soft Cell)		4:36
8.	"Where the Heart Is '91" (Soft Cell)		4:32
9.	"I Feel Love (Medley)" (Jimmy Somerville with Bronski Beat featuring Marc Almond)	Moroder, Bellotte, Summer	5:47
10.	"Tears Run Rings" (Marc Almond)	M. Almond	5:40
11.	"A Lover Spurned" (Marc Almond)	M. Almond	5:38
12.	"Something's Gotten Hold of My Heart" (Marc Almond Featuring Gene Pitney)	Greenway, Cook	4:41

European edition bonus tracks
No.	Title	Writer(s)	Length
13.	"Say Hello Wave Goodbye 12" (The Long Goodbye – Extended Mendelsohn Remix)" (Soft Cell)		8:18
14.	"Waifs and Strays (Grid Twilight Mix)" (Marc Almond)	M. Almond	6:36

US edition bonus tracks
No.	Title	Writer(s)	Length
13.	"Waifs and Strays" (Marc Almond)	M. Almond	4:32
14.	"Memorabilia '91 (12" Version)" (Soft Cell) (not included on Cassette editions)		6:49
15.	"Tainted Love '91 (12" version)" (Soft Cell) (not included on Cassette editions)	Ed Cobb	5:51

== Memorabilia – The Video Singles ==
A 14-track video compilation, Memorabilia – The Video Singles, was released with a slightly different track listing. "What" was accidentally left off the printed track listing on the outer cover of some releases of Memorabilia – The Video Singles, but is actually included on the videocassette itself.

1. "Memorabilia"
2. "Tainted Love '91"
3. "Bedsitter"
4. "Torch"
5. "What"
6. "Say Hello, Wave Goodbye '91"
7. "Soul Inside"
8. "Where the Heart Is"
9. "I Feel Love (Medley)"
10. "Tears Run Rings"
11. "A Love Spurned"
12. "Something's Gotten Hold of My Heart"
13. "The Stars We Are" (Annie Hogan, Marc Almond)
14. "Waifs and Strays"
