= Grand Guignol (disambiguation) =

Grand Guignol refers to the former Théâtre du Grand-Guignol of Paris, which specialized in grisly horror shows.

Grand Guignol may also be:

- Any gruesome or gory drama or event, such as a Grande Dame Guignol
- Grand Guignol (album), album by Naked City
- "Le Grand Guignol", song by Soft Cell from the album Cruelty Without Beauty
- "Grand Guignol", storyline in the comic book series Starman
- "Gesshoku Grand Guignol" (Lunar Eclipse Grand Guignol), song by the Japanese band Ali Project
- "Grand Guignol", song by Bajofondo from the album Mar dulce

== See also ==
- Guignol, French puppet character
