= Down in the Subway =

Compilation album by Soft Cell
- Released: 1994
- Genre: Synth-pop
- Length: 65:54
- Labels: Spectrum; 550 189-2

Soft Cell chronology
Memorabilia – The Singles (1991)	Down in the Subway (1994)	Say Hello to Soft Cell (1996)

Down in the Subway is a budget compilation album by Soft Cell. The album was released in 1994 and comprises singles, the b-side "Fun City" and selected tracks from their first three albums. The four-page booklet contains a brief biography by Mark Brennan.

== Track listing ==
1. "Where Did Our Love Go?" - 4:27
2. "Memorabilia" - 5:24
3. "Torch" - 4:09
4. "Entertain Me" - 3:40
5. "Fun City" - 7:40
6. "Secret Life" - 3:39
7. "Kitchen Sink Drama" - 4:00
8. "Down in the Subway" - 2:53
9. "Baby Doll" - 6:47
10. "Where the Heart Is" - 4:35
11. "Insecure Me" - 4:41
12. "Seedy Films" - 5:08
13. "Loving You Hating Me" - 4:22
14. "Soul Inside" - 4:28

== Notes ==
All songs written by Marc Almond and David Ball except for:-

- "Where Did Our Love Go?" composed by Lamont Dozier, Brian Holland and Edward Holland Jr.
- "Down in the Subway" composed by Jack Hammer (Earl Burroughs).
