= Non-Stop Erotic Cabaret =

1981 studio album by Soft Cell

- Cover image by Peter Ashworth

Studio album by Soft Cell
- Released: 27 November 1981
- Recorded: 1980–1981
- Studios: Mediasound (New York); Camden Cell (London) (Note: Except "Tainted Love"); Advision (London) (Note: "Tainted Love")
- Genres: Synth-pop; electropop
- Length: 40:32
- Label: Some Bizzare
- Producer: Mike Thorne

Soft Cell chronology
Mutant Moments (1980)	Non-Stop Erotic Cabaret (1981)	Non Stop Ecstatic Dancing (1982)

Singles from Non-Stop Erotic Cabaret
- 1. "Tainted Love" Released: 17 July 1981; 2. "Bedsitter" Released: November 1981; 3. "Say Hello, Wave Goodbye" Released: January 1982

Non-Stop Erotic Cabaret is the debut studio album by English synth-pop duo Soft Cell, released on 27 November 1981 by Some Bizzare Records. The album's critical and commercial success was bolstered by the success of its lead single, a cover version of Gloria Jones's song "Tainted Love", which topped the charts worldwide and became the second best-selling British single of 1981. In the United States, as a result of the single's success, the album had reported advance orders of more than 200,000 copies. The album spawned two additional top-five singles in the UK: "Bedsitter" and "Say Hello, Wave Goodbye".

== Recording ==
The album was created on a limited budget; it was supposedly recorded almost entirely with a ReVox tape recorder, a borrowed Roland drum machine belonging to Kit Hain, a Korg SB-100 Synthe Bass, and an NED Synclavier, belonging to producer Mike Thorne. David Ball noted the Synclavier would ordinarily have been well beyond the band's means, costing £120,000: "That was our technological advantage over the other synth bands at the time. In fact, I remember Don Was calling me – desperate to know how we got those sounds". The album name derived from a real strip club sign in Soho. The group caused some controversy in the United Kingdom over the song "Sex Dwarf", the music video of which was banned due to its explicit, S&M-related content.

In 2026, discussing their final album Danceteria, singer Marc Almond commented that Non-Stop Erotic Cabaret is a concept album: "[It] was a kind of narrative, as well. I was really happy when I was having dinner with Neil Tennant from the Pet Shop Boys once and Neil said, 'Non-Stop Erotic Cabaret is a musical, isn’t it?' And yes, it’s about this guy with his boring suburban life who goes out to find the wildness in Soho and meets up with people on the peripheries of life, this red-light life. And he meets a sex worker and has an affair with her, but eventually it’s 'Say Hello, Wave Goodbye'. He goes back to his wife, but he’s had this adventure that he can look back on. I’m glad Neil picked up on that".

== Reception ==
Professional ratings
Review scores
Source	Rating
AllMusic	4.5/5 stars
Encyclopedia of Popular Music	4/5 stars
Pitchfork	8.5/10
Record Mirror	5/5 stars
Rolling Stone	3/5 stars
Rolling Stone Russia	5/5 stars
Select	4/5
Smash Hits	8½/10
The Village Voice	B+

Reviews for the album were generally positive. Critic Steve Sutherland of Melody Maker said "Non-Stop Erotic Cabaret... is the brashest, most brilliant and least-caring indictment of pop music's bankruptcy I've ever heard. No compassion, no sorrow, no joy, it just faces facts and moves to the motions... Like traditional cabaret, the whole thing parodies true emotion and like the best subversive cabaret its shallowness makes those devalued emotions even more painful – the very real decadence of this album springs from its callous realisation of pop's impotency, and yet its bored resignation to the ritual." Similarly, Robert Christgau of The Village Voice stated that "these takeoffs on Clubland 'decadence' get at the emotion underneath with just the right admixture of camp cynicism." However, NME found the album's premise was hollow, complaining that "the Soft Cell sex strategy should offer something spicy, rude and even a little wonderful... but Soft Cell are conceptualists who rely on too many preconceptions and play around with too many ideas to convince you of any personal energy or commitment... Soft Cell are very plain fare – unspectacular music and very drab and flat lyrics, wrapped in a hint of special promise which is never realised."

=== Accolades ===
CMJ New Music Report included Non-Stop Erotic Cabaret on a list of The Top 25 College Radio Albums of All Time. American magazine Out placed the album at number 66 on their list of The 100 Greatest, Gayest Albums (of All Time). It was also included in Robert Dimery's book 1001 Albums You Must Hear Before You Die.

== Track listing ==
All tracks are written by David Ball and Marc Almond, except where noted.

Side one
No.	Title	Writer(s)	Length
1.	"Frustration"		4:12
2.	"Tainted Love"	Ed Cobb	2:34
3.	"Seedy Films"		5:05
4.	"Youth"		3:15
5.	"Sex Dwarf"		5:15

Side two
No.	Title	Length
6.	"Entertain Me"	3:35
7.	"Chips on My Shoulder"	4:05
8.	"Bedsitter"	3:36
9.	"Secret Life"	3:37
10.	"Say Hello, Wave Goodbye"	5:24

1996 remastered CD bonus tracks
No.	Title	Writer(s)	Length
11.	"Where Did Our Love Go?" (B-side of "Tainted Love")	Brian Holland; Lamont Dozier; Edward Holland Jr.	3:14
12.	"Memorabilia" (B-side of "A Man Can Get Lost" in the UK and "Tainted Love" in the US)		4:49
13.	"Facility Girls" (B-side of "Bedsitter")		2:25
14.	"Fun City" (Marc and the Mambas B-side of "Say Hello, Wave Goodbye" 12″ single)		7:45
15.	"Torch" (non-album single)		4:08
16.	"Insecure Me" (B-side of "Torch")		4:39
17.	"What?" (non-album single)	H. B. Barnum	2:50
18.	"....So" (B-side of "What?")	Ball	3:47

2002 remastered CD bonus tracks
No.	Title	Writer(s)	Length
11.	"Tainted Love/Where Did Our Love Go" (12″ mix)	Cobb; B. Holland; Dozier; E. Holland	8:55
12.	"Tainted Dub" (12″ mix)	Cobb	9:12

2008 deluxe edition – disc one bonus tracks (Non Stop Ecstatic Dancing)
No.	Title	Writer(s)	Length
11.	"Memorabilia"		5:20
12.	"Where Did Our Love Go?"	B. Holland; Dozier; E. Holland	4:22
13.	"What?"	Barnum	4:31
14.	"A Man Could Get Lost"		3:57
15.	"Chips on My Shoulder"		4:28
16.	"Sex Dwarf"		5:10
17.	"Torch" (bonus track)		4:08
18.	"A Man Can Get Lost" (bonus track)		3:18

2008 deluxe edition – disc two
No.	Title	Writer(s)	Length
1.	"Memorabilia" (extended)		7:45
2.	"Tainted Love/Where Did Our Love Go?" (12″ mix)	Cobb; B. Holland; Dozier; E. Holland	9:02
3.	"Bedsitter" (extended)		7:52
4.	"Say Hello, Wave Goodbye" (extended)		8:53
5.	"Torch" (extended)		8:27
6.	"What?" (extended)	Barnum	6:06
7.	"Persuasion"		7:38
8.	"Facility Girls"		2:21
9.	"Fun City"		7:44
10.	"Insecure...Me?" (Extended)		8:14
11.	"....So"	Ball	3:49

== Personnel ==
Credits adapted from the liner notes of Non-Stop Erotic Cabaret.

=== Soft Cell ===
- Marc Almond – vocals
- David Ball – electronic and acoustic instruments

=== Additional musicians ===
- Vicious Pink Phenomena – backing vocals
- David Tofani – saxophone (track 1); clarinet (track 3)

=== Technical ===
- Mike Thorne – production
- Don Wershba – engineering (tracks 1, 3–10)
- Paul Hardiman – engineering (track 2)
- Harvey Goldberg – mixing
- Nicky Kalliongis – engineering assistance
- Andy Hoggman – engineering assistance
- Michael Christopher – engineering assistance
- Jack Skinner – mastering
- Arun Chakraverti – mastering
- Daniel Miller – production (1996 reissue)
- David Ball – production (1996 reissue)

=== Artwork ===
- Peter Ashworth – photography
- Huw Feather – padded cell
- Andrew Prewett – design
- Richard Smith – liner notes (1996 reissue)

== Charts ==
=== Weekly charts ===
Weekly chart performance for Non-Stop Erotic Cabaret
Chart (1981–1982)	Peak position
Australian Albums (Kent Music Report)	34
Canada Top Albums/CDs (RPM)	2
Finnish Albums (Suomen virallinen lista)	19
German Albums (Offizielle Top 100)	23
New Zealand Albums (RMNZ)	7
Swedish Albums (Sverigetopplistan)	25
UK Albums (Official Charts)	5
US Billboard 200	22
US Top R&B/Hip-Hop Albums (Billboard)	55

=== Year-end charts ===
Year-end chart performance for Non-Stop Erotic Cabaret
Chart (1982)	Position
Canada Top Albums/CDs (RPM)	13
UK Albums (BMRB)	20
US Billboard 200	32

== Certifications ==
Certifications for Non-Stop Erotic Cabaret
Region	Certification	Certified units/sales
Canada (Music Canada)	Platinum	100,000^{^}
New Zealand (RMNZ)	Gold	7,500^{‡}
United Kingdom (BPI)	Platinum	300,000^{^}
^{^} Shipments figures based on certification alone.^{‡} Sales+streaming figures based on certification alone.
