= The Bedsit Tapes =

Compilation album by Soft Cell
- Released: 30 August 2005

Soft Cell chronology
Soft Cell at the BBC (2003)	The Bedsit Tapes (2005)	*Happiness Not Included (2022)

Professional ratings
Review scores
Source	Rating
AllMusic	4/5 stars

The Bedsit Tapes is a compilation of songs recorded by the synthpop/new wave duo Soft Cell before their record contract with Some Bizzare Records. The album, released on 1 August 2005, collects various songs recorded in an amateur studio at Leeds Metropolitan University, then called Leeds Polytechnic, in Leeds. The album includes three tracks which appeared on their rare independent 1980 release, Mutant Moments. The album has received criticism for not being comprehensive enough, excluding several rare cuts which have appeared on previous bootlegs. David Ball, the keyboardist, comments on the album in the liner notes.

The album includes a cover version of the song "Paranoid", originally recorded by British heavy metal band Black Sabbath.

== Track listing ==
1. "Potential" (edited version with fade-out; the original segues into "L.O.V.E. Feelings")
2. "L.O.V.E. Feelings" (edited version)
3. "Metro MRX"
4. "Bleak Is My Favourite Cliché"
5. "Occupational Hazard"
6. "Mix"
7. "Factory Fun"
8. "Science Fiction Stories"
9. "Purely Functional"
10. "A Cut Above the Rest"
11. "Paranoid" (Geezer Butler, Tony Iommi, Ozzy Osbourne, Bill Ward)
12. "Excretory Eat Anorexia Nervosa"
13. "Cleansing Fanatic"
14. "Walking Make-Up Counter"
15. "Pyrex My Cuisine"
16. "Tupperware Party"

== Notes ==
Tracks were recorded in bedrooms and the polytechnic art department studio in a very basic fashion between 1978 and 1980. Sleeve notes by Dave Ball.
