= The Art of Falling Apart =

Studio album by Soft Cell
- Released: January 1983
- Recorded: August–September 1982
- Genre: Synth-pop
- Length: 40:00
- Labels: Some Bizzare, Sire, Vertigo
- Producers: Mike Thorne, Soft Cell

Soft Cell chronology
The Twelve Inch Singles (1982)	The Art of Falling Apart (1983)	This Last Night in Sodom (1984)

Singles from The Art of Falling Apart
- 1. "Where the Heart Is" Released: November 1982; 2. "Loving You, Hating Me" Released: 1982 (US/Canada); 3. "Numbers" Released: February 1983; 4. "Heat" Released: 1983 (US)

The Art of Falling Apart is the second full-length album by the English synth-pop duo Soft Cell, released in 1983.

The album reached No. 5 on the UK charts, although its two singles "Where the Heart Is" and the double A-sided single "Numbers" / "Barriers" both failed to reach the Top 20, breaking the duo's run of five consecutive Top 5 singles in the UK, reaching No. 21 and No. 25, respectively. The album opener "Forever the Same" was initially planned as the 3rd UK single release, but withdrawn, with the original extended version of the track being included on 2018's career retrospective box set Keychains and Snowstorms: The Soft Cell Story.

Initial copies of the album included a bonus 12-inch EP containing the tracks "Martin" and "Hendrix Medley".

== Background ==
The song "Martin" was inspired by the 1978 horror film Martin directed by George A. Romero.

The song "Numbers" refers to the banned 1967 novel Numbers by John Rechy.

== Reception ==
Professional ratings
Review scores
Source	Rating
AllMusic	3/5 stars
Robert Christgau	B−

In a joint review of The Art of Falling Apart and Berlin's Pleasure Victim, Michael Goldberg of Record remarked that while the opening tracks "Forever the Same" and "Where the Heart Is" are decent, Marc Almond's monotonal vocal style quickly wears thin, and David Ball's use of the same synthesizer stylistics on every track similarly "[makes] the whole album sound like variations on one theme." He particularly derided the synth-pop renditions of Jimi Hendrix songs, saying "Just that concept ought to elicit a chuckle. Suffice to say that Soft Cell are not able to do for the Hendrix songs what they did for Gloria Jones' 'Tainted Love'."

The album was ranked at number 4 among the "Albums of the Year" for 1983 by NME.

== Track listing ==
All tracks written and composed by David Ball and Marc Almond, except where noted.

1. "Forever the Same" – 5:06
2. "Where the Heart Is" – 4:34
3. "Numbers" – 4:55
4. "Heat" – 6:11
5. "Kitchen Sink Drama" – 3:56
6. "Baby Doll" – 6:44
7. "Loving You, Hating Me" – 4:18
8. "The Art of Falling Apart" – 5:01

Extra tracks on remastered CD: SOME BIZZARE/MERCURY (558,266-2, June 1998)

1. "Hendrix Medley" – 10:20 (Jimi Hendrix, Billy Roberts) [on bonus 12" with initial copies of the vinyl LP]
2. "Martin" – 10:16 [on bonus 12" with initial copies of the vinyl LP]
3. "Barriers" – 7:05 [double A-side of "Numbers" 7" and 12" singles]
4. "It's a Mug's Game" – 8:15 [B-side of "Where the Heart Is" 12"]

== Personnel ==
Soft Cell

- Marc Almond – vocals, production
- David Ball – synthesizers, multi-instruments, backing vocals, production

Additional personnel

- John Gatchell – trumpet, horns
- Mike Thorne – production
- Harvey Goldberg – engineering, mixing
- Don Weshba – engineering
