= Pedro INF =

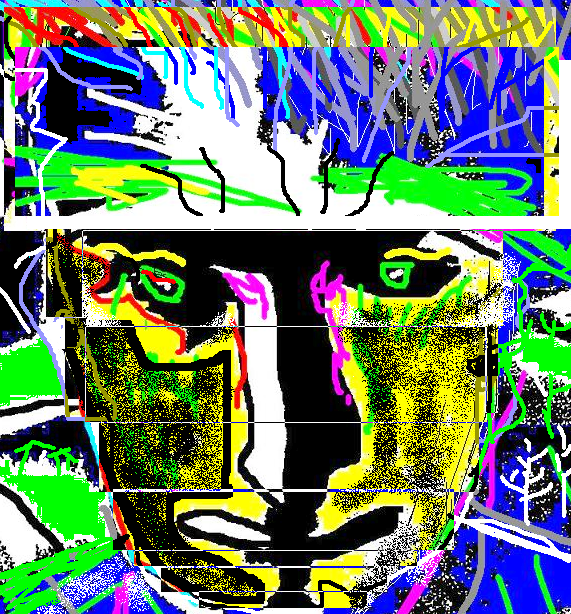
- PEDRO INF self portrait

Background information
- Born: Pedro Granja De Carvalho
- Origin: Portugal
- Genres: Electronic, IDM, ambient, experimental, glitch, braindance
- Occupation: Producer
- Label: Some Bizzare
- Website: Official Web Site

Pedro INF (born Pedro Granja De Carvalho) is a Portuguese electronic music artist, currently signed to Some Bizzare Records.

== Background ==
Pedro INF is an alterego of Pedro Granja De Carvalho, a musician whose main style can be categorized as IDM, braindance, or experimental electronic music. He began recording at the end of the 1980s when he was a member of the industrial Portuguese band from 1989-1994 named Ode Filipica. Pedro INF was using early computers for music, around 1986 he was using a Timex Sinclair computer. Today, Pedro INF is using a range of vintage recording equipment and analog synthesizers, electronic percussion and drum machines, avoiding the use of computers where circuit bending is the rule.

In 2007 Pedro INF signed to Some Bizzare Records. His first album was released by Some Bizzare Records SBZ 079CD "pedro inf" The label boss, Stevo Pearce (ex-manager of Soft Cell) also included a Pedro INF track, "The Strategy Of The Spider in The Wire," on the new "Some Bizzare Double Album" released in 2008. Stevo Pearce is credited as executive producer of the album. His second album was released 2010 by Some Bizzare Records, "Azphonix", all the Mastering took place at The Exchange in London and was performed by Simon Davey who has mastered bands like Laibach, Aphex Twin .
Also known from his own theory of Universal Referential Frame, that was published with the album SBZ 079CD "pedro inf."

Pedro INF is also the mentor and webmaster of the netlabel Plastic4Records. Other artists on this netlabel include Wet Dentist, fmt&=18, Luminous Fridge, and Quell Figure.

Pedro Inf also makes forays into the painting (your last exhibition at Art gallery "Arte Roca"). All the Albums released features paintings made by Pedro INF.

Pedro INF is tired of the current output of the electronic and post industrial music scenes, whose innovation has regressed to pre conceived ideas about music production, Pedro INF is taking lead from the pioneers such as Kandinsky, Miro, Coil, Test Department, Richard D. James (Aphex Twin) and Mu-ziq.

Designing and building his own effects, computers and programs Pedro INF has created his own self-styled 'sonar paintings', he believes that art does not need humans at all to exist, in his own words "there is no need for a receptor and the need of a receptor is only because we cannot escape the human condition of egocentrism".

Ticking the boxes that this enigmatic producer has the madness to pull of his unique brand of electronica "the first goal of pedro inf is to see the painting and not remember how it was done.

== Discography ==
- 2008 - pedro inf - SBZ 079CD (Some Bizzare Records)
- 2008 - pedro inf Vinyl 12" - SBZ112 (Some Bizzare Records)
- 2008 - Some Bizzare Double Album (Some Bizzare Records Compilation) - The Strategy Of The Spider in The Wire
- 2010 - Azphonix - SBZCD115 (Some Bizzare Records)
- 2013 - I have a dream - a Youtube release (Some Bizzare Records)
- 2014 - Beat Going On - a Youtube release (Some Bizzare Records)
- 2020 - An insectoid plan - a Youtube release (Some Bizzare Records)
- 2020 - No Name - a Youtube release (Some Bizzare Records)
- 2020 - Red Pil - a Youtube release (Some Bizzare Records)
