= Mutant Moments =

EP by Soft Cell
- Released: 1980
- Label: Big Frock Records
- Producer: Soft Cell

Soft Cell chronology
| Mutant Moments (1980) | Non-Stop Erotic Cabaret (1981) |

Mutant Moments is the debut EP by synthpop duo Soft Cell. Only 2000 copies were pressed, originally by Big Frock Records, then later by a Japanese fan club, making the record extremely rare and prized by collectors and fans alike. The duo, who attended Leeds Metropolitan University, originally developed a cult following with their performances which routinely included bizarre sexual imagery and visuals representing sexual themes. Some examples include instances where singer Marc Almond would smear his body with cat food, simulate sexual intercourse with a full-length mirror, or appear onstage in drag.

The band was signed to Some Bizzare Records soon after its release, with "The Girl With The Patent Leather Face" being released on the Some Bizzare Album and later a 7-inch single "A Man Can Get Lost" and 12-inch single "Memorabilia", both being released the following year.

The EP includes the song "Frustration," which also appears on their full-length studio album Non-stop Erotic Cabaret, though the two versions sound very different. The other three songs from the EP also appear on the rarities/bootleg compilation The Bedsit Tapes.

The Mutant Moments EP received an official rerelease in May 2020. Originally intended to be a limited release for Record Store Day (UK), it was released as a 10-inch single in clear vinyl, through the band's online shop at Lexer Music.

The 10 inch version was released again in orange vinyl, with matching orange artwork, as a record store day issue on June 14, 2024

== Track listing ==
| No. | Title | Length |
|---|---|---|
| 1. | "Potential" | 3:26 |
| 2. | "L.O.V.E. Feelings" | 3:27 |
| 3. | "Metro MRX" | 2:12 |
| 4. | "Frustration" | 3:37 |

This version of "Frustration" can be found on Demo Non Stop, which was released in 2006 by Some Bizzare.
