= Bedsitter (song) =

- Cover photography by Peter Ashworth

Single by Soft Cell

from the album Non-Stop Erotic Cabaret
- B-side: "Facility Girls"
- Released: 2 November 1981
- Genre: Synth-pop; electropop
- Length: 3:36 (Single Version)
- Label: Some Bizzare Records
- Songwriters: Marc Almond, David Ball
- Producer: Mike Thorne

Soft Cell singles chronology
"Tainted Love" (1981)	"Bedsitter" (1981)	"Say Hello, Wave Goodbye" (1982)

Music video
- "Bedsitter" on YouTube

"Bedsitter" is a song by British synth-pop duo Soft Cell, from the album Non-Stop Erotic Cabaret. Released as a single on early 2 November 1981, it reached No. 4 in the UK.

A song that explored the underbelly of the London club scene of the time, it has been described by critic Jon Savage as one of the greatest songs of the 1980s. Pet Shop Boys singer Neil Tennant included the track in a 2006 edition of the Guardian's "Soundtrack of My Life" series.
