= Soft Cell at the BBC =

At the BBC

Live album by Soft Cell
- Released: 14 October 2003
- Recorded: 26 July 1981 – 1 June 1983
- Genre: Rock
- Label: Strange Fruit

Soft Cell chronology
Live (2003)	At the BBC (2003)	The Bedsit Tapes (2005)

Professional ratings
Review scores
Source	Rating
Allmusic	link

At the BBC is an album of sessions recorded for the BBC by Soft Cell. The album was released on 14 October 2003.

== Track listing ==
1. "Bedsitter"
2. "Chips on My Shoulder"
3. "Seedy Films"
4. "Youth"
5. "Entertain Me"
6. "Soul Inside"
7. "Her Imagination"
8. "Where Was Your Heart When You Needed It Most?"
9. "Youth" (multimedia track)
10. "Sex Dwarf" (multimedia track)

== Notes ==
The first five tracks are from the Richard Skinner show on 26 July 1981, the last three are from the David Jensen show on 6 January 1983. The CD also contains video footage of Soft Cell performing 'Youth' and 'Sex Dwarf' live on the Old Grey Whistle Test programme recorded on 4 February 1982.
