= I'd Rather Shout at a Returning Echo than Kid That Someone's Listening =

Compilation album by Some Bizzare Artists
- Released: 2001
- Genre: Alternative rock
- Label: Some Bizzare

Some Bizzare Artists chronology
ish (1990)	I'd Rather Shout at a Returning Echo than Kid That Someone's Listening (2001)	Redefining the Prologue (2006)

I'd Rather Shout at a Returning Echo than Kid That Someone's Listening is the fourth compilation album released by Some Bizzare Records, containing the first new track from the then recently re-formed Soft Cell. It also included two tracks "Nye (We are Silent)" and "Uniform Spaces" by Cabaret Voltaire member Richard H. Kirk. These were recorded under the names "Sandoz" and "Orchestra Terrestrial".

== Track listing ==
1. Koot - Walk on Water
2. Egill - Oh I Need your Love
3. Lorien - Sweet Night
4. Kai Motta - Looks Like More Rain
5. Sandoz - Nye (We Are Silent)
6. Soft Cell - God Shaped Hole
7. Egill - I'm Not 100 Per Cent Reliable
8. Koot - Reasons
9. Kai Motta - Picture That
10. Lorien - Planet New Earth
11. The Droidz - Standing on my Own
12. Orchestra Terrestrial - Uniform Spaces

== Personnel ==
- Compiled by Stevo Pearce
- Mastered by Ralph Ruppert at Headroom Studio
- Visual Concept by Kram
