= Danceteria (album) =

Studio album by Soft Cell
- Released: 25 September 2026
- Length: 62:53
- Label: Republic of Music
- Producers: Marc Almond; Dave Ball

Soft Cell chronology
*Happiness Not Included (2022)	Danceteria (2026)

Singles from Danceteria
- 1. "Out Come the Freaks" Released: 26 March 2026; 2. "Danceteria" Released: 9 June 2026; 3. "In Heaven (When I Dance with You)" Released: 30 July 2026

Danceteria is the sixth and final studio album by English synth-pop duo Soft Cell, released on 25 September 2026 through Republic of Music. It was completed before the death of Soft Cell co-founder Dave Ball in October 2025 and has been described by Marc Almond as a tribute to Ball and to the New York nightclub Danceteria.

== Background and release ==
Danceteria features the final recordings made with David Ball, with the album being completed two days before his death in October 2025. According to Marc Almond, after finishing the record, "Dave told me, 'Do me one favour: Don’t chop the album to pieces. This is how I want it to be'".

A cover of "Out Come the Freaks", featuring vocals from Nona Hendryx, was released as the first single from the album on 26 March, 2026. The title track was released as the second single from the album on 9 June. The third single, "In Heaven (When I Dance With You)", with accompanying music video, was released on 30 July. Danceteria was released on 25 September through Republic of Music.

Singer Marc Almond said that in a sense, Danceteria is a concept album: "I did kind of write it as a night through New York, starting off in a cafeteria in the nightclub. 'Times Square' is a true story about me and my friend going to a 42nd Street sleazy cinema and watching a slasher movie, and then going out in the rain and dancing without our shoes on. 'The Rainbow Room' is about my birthday party. It’s a romantic story, having dinner with a friend, but it’s a weird look to the future. And then the album ends up in the drugginess of 'Losing Yourself' and 'What Is Your Morality' and 'Crackland', and then you wake up the next morning with a cup of coffee and it’s 'Wave to America'. And then we go back to the nightclub with 'Out Come the Freaks'. I wanted it to go in a circle. Non-Stop Erotic Cabaret was a kind of narrative, as well".

Discussing the album title, Almond explained that "Danceteria was where I spent most of my early time in New York, so that’s why I wanted to have that as the setting for this more celebratory album. It’s not just a reference to the club, but also about how we dance our way through life. Life is a Danceteria".

== Track listing ==
All tracks are written by Marc Almond and Dave Ball, except where noted.

Danceteria track listing
No.	Title	Length
1.	"Elusive"	2:28
2.	"Danceteria"	4:58
3.	"The Space Inside"	4:19
4.	"Times Square"	5:03
5.	"Two of a Kind"	3:44
6.	"The Rainbow Room"	5:45
7.	"In Heaven (When I Dance with You)"	4:01
8.	"Decadence Is Hard Work"	3:07
9.	"Crackland"	3:39
10.	"What Is Your Morality"	5:27
11.	"Losing Yourself"	5:07
12.	"After Hours"	5:37
13.	"Wave to America"	4:34
14.	"Out Come the Freaks" (featuring Nona Hendryx) (Don Was, David Was, Michael Zilkha, Jack Tann)	5:04
Total length:		62:53

== Charts ==
Chart performance for Danceteria
Chart (2026)	Peak position
Scottish Albums (Official Charts)	9
UK Albums (Official Charts)	26
UK Independent Albums (Official Charts)	1
