= Judy Street =

American singer (born c. 1949)

- Born: c.1949 Indiana
- Genres: Soul
- Occupation: Singer
- Years active: 1966–
- Labels: Strider, Grapevine

Judy Street (born c.1949) is an American singer best known for her popular northern soul single, "What".

Born in Indiana, her father was a concert pianist, her mother a flute player in a marching band. After being discovered singing in a bar in Phoenix, Arizona, Street was given a recording opportunity. In 1968 in Hollywood, California she recorded "You Turn Me On", written by H.B. Barnum and Ben Raleigh and an H.B. Barnum song "What" as a B-side. The record was exported to England and it was picked up by DJs at Wigan Casino, a major nightclub in the northern soul music scene. Soon, "What" became the track most played, going on to be a hit on the northern soul nightclub circuit and be ranked 23 of 500 northern soul singles. Following a resurgence of popularity for northern soul music in England in 1977, the song was re-released, and again in 1982 with a B-side by Hi-Fly. A cover version of "What" by British synthpop group Soft Cell reached Number 3 in the UK and Number 6 in Ireland in 1982. Street was unaware of the popularity of the song and never toured the UK. From 1970 until 1990 she toured with her own bands, including The Swinging Society, in the US, singing and drumming. Finally, in 2005 the popularity of "What" was acknowledged when Street did several interviews for radio, magazines and books.

Street became a teacher of drums and piano in Nashville, Tennessee and has performed with her husband's band in downtown Nashville. In 2014, Street recorded a 10-song CD, called "Cover Girl" containing covers of Northern Soul songs.
