= Happiness Not Included =

*Happiness Not Included

Studio album by Soft Cell
- Released: 6 May 2022
- Recorded: January 2020 – March 2021
- Studio: Dean Street, London
- Genre: Synth-pop
- Length: 55:04
- Label: BMG
- Producer: Soft Cell; Philip Larsen

Soft Cell chronology
The Bedsit Tapes (2005)	*Happiness Not Included (2022)	Danceteria (2026)

Singles from *Happiness Not Included
- 1. "Bruises on All My Illusions" Released: 17 November 2021; 2. "Purple Zone" Released: 22 March 2022; 3. "Nostalgia Machine" Released: November 2022; 4. "Light Sleepers" Released: December 2022

*Happiness Not Included is the fifth studio album by British synth-pop duo Soft Cell, released on 6 May 2022 through BMG Rights Management. It is their first studio album in 20 years, following Cruelty Without Beauty (2002). It was preceded by the release of the single "Bruises on All My Illusions" in 2021 as well as "Purple Zone" in 2022, the latter a collaboration with fellow British synth-pop duo Pet Shop Boys.

In 2023, two companion albums were released to accompany the album: Happiness Now Completed, which features additional tracks and remixes recorded during the album sessions, and Happiness Now Extended, which features extended versions of all of the original album's tracks.

== Critical reception ==
Professional ratings
Aggregate scores
Source	Rating
Metacritic	78/100
Review scores
Source	Rating
The Guardian	4/5 stars
The Independent	3/5 stars
The Line of Best Fit	7/10
Mojo	4/5 stars
musicOMH	2.5/5 stars
The Telegraph	4/5 stars
Uncut	8/10

On review aggregator Metacritic, *Happiness Not Included received a score of 78 out of 100 based on nine reviews, indicating "generally favorable" reception. Dave Simpson of The Guardian called it a "wryly hopeful record" with "some trademark electro bangers". Writing for The Line of Best Fit, Chris Todd summarised the "flavour" of the album as "one of world weariness peppered with salacious reflections of tales of past". Roisin O'Connor of The Independent remarked on the downbeat nature of the lyrics, writing that while Soft Cell "were hardly upbeat to begin with, [...] this is downright miserable" although acknowledging that they "have good reason to be" and concluding that "it's not all hopeless – at least the music is good".

== Track listing ==
All tracks are written by Marc Almond and David Ball except where noted.

*Happiness Not Included CD track listing
No.	Title	Length
1.	"Happy Happy Happy"	4:46
2.	"Polaroid"	4:41
3.	"Bruises on All My Illusions"	4:45
4.	"Purple Zone" (with Pet Shop Boys)	3:11
5.	"Heart Like Chernobyl"	3:24
6.	"Light Sleepers"	4:41
7.	"*Happiness Not Included"	4:55
8.	"Nostalgia Machine"	4:34
9.	"Nighthawks"	5:14
10.	"I'm Not a Friend of God"	4:34
11.	"Tranquiliser"	3:50
12.	"New Eden"	6:29
Total length:		55:04

== Charts ==
Chart performance for *Happiness Not Included
Chart (2022)	Peak position
Austrian Albums (Ö3 Austria)	51
Belgian Albums (Ultratop Flanders)	175
Belgian Albums (Ultratop Wallonia)	55
German Albums (Offizielle Top 100)	12
Scottish Albums (OCC)	5
Spanish Albums (Promusicae)	37
Swiss Albums (Schweizer Hitparade)	86
UK Albums (OCC)	7
UK Dance Albums (OCC)	1
UK Independent Albums (OCC)	2
