= Cruelty Without Beauty =

2002 studio album by Soft Cell

Studio album by Soft Cell
- Released: 8 October 2002
- Recorded: 2002
- Genre: Synth-pop
- Length: 54:56
- Labels: Cooking Vinyl; COOK CD245; Spin Art; SPART 116
- Producers: Dave Ball, Ingo Vauk

Soft Cell chronology
The Very Best of Soft Cell (2002)	Cruelty Without Beauty (2002)	Live (2003)

Singles from Cruelty Without Beauty
- 1. "Monoculture" b/w "Dancing Alone" Released: September 2002; 2. "The Night" b/w "Perversity" Released: January 2003

Professional ratings
Aggregate scores
Source	Rating
Metacritic	70/100
Review scores
Source	Rating
Allmusic	4/5 stars
Blender	3/5 stars
Robert Christgau	(dud)
Hot Press	8.5/10
NME	Mixed
Release Magazine	7/10 stars
The Rolling Stone Album Guide	3/5 stars
Q	4/5 stars
Uncut	4/5 stars

Cruelty Without Beauty is the fourth studio album by Soft Cell. The album was released on 8 October 2002. It is Soft Cell's first album since 1984's This Last Night in Sodom. An expanded and remastered re-issue of the album was released on 25 September 2020. It included new remixes by Dave Ball, four of which were released as a limited white vinyl 12-inch single. The album was also released on vinyl for the first time.

== Track listing ==
All songs written by Marc Almond and David Ball unless otherwise noted.

1. "Darker Times" (Marc Almond, David Ball, Ingo Vauk)
2. "Monoculture"
3. "Le Grand Guignol"
4. "The Night" (Bob Gaudio, Al Ruzicka)
5. "Last Chance"
6. "Together Alone"
7. "Desperate"
8. "Whatever It Takes"
9. "All Out of Love"
10. "Sensation Nation"
11. "Caligula Syndrome"
12. "On an Up"

== Personnel ==
Soft Cell

- Marc Almond – vocals, backing vocals, arrangement
- Dave Ball – electronic instruments, additional backing vocals

with:

- Dominic Glover – trumpet
- Nicol D. Thomson – trombone
- Mike Smith – saxophone
- Chris Braide – backing vocals

Technical

- Layout – Grace Van Detta
- Engineer – Ingo Vauk
- Assistant mix engineer – Haicong Guo
- Mastering – Dave Blackman
- Photography – Evelyn
- Producer – Dave Ball, Ingo Vauk
- Programming – Ingo Vauk
- Additional help – Antti Uusimaki, Philip Bagenal
