= Marc Almond =

English singer (born 1957)

Marc Almond OBE
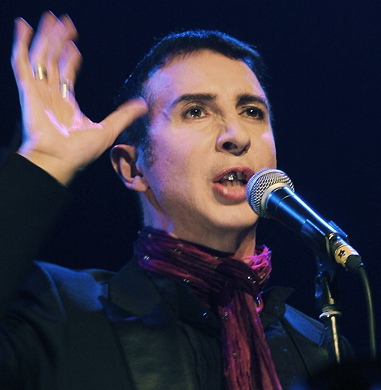
- Almond in 2008

Background information
- Born: Peter Mark Almond; 9 July 1957 (age 69); Southport, Lancashire, England
- Origin: Leeds, West Riding of Yorkshire, England
- Genres: Synth-pop; new wave; art pop; gothic rock
- Occupations: Singer, songwriter
- Years active: 1976–present
- Labels: Some Bizzare; Virgin; Sire; Echo; Blue Star; Sanctuary; Vertigo; Cherry Red
- Website: marcalmond.co.uk

Peter Mark Almond (born 9 July 1957) is an English singer-songwriter and musician. He is the lead vocalist of the synth-pop duo Soft Cell. He is known for his distinctive soulful voice and androgynous image, and has had a diverse career as a solo artist.

Almond rose to prominence in the early 1980s with Soft Cell's hit "Tainted Love" (1981), which became a defining track of the new wave and synth-pop movement. After Soft Cell disbanded in 1984, Almond pursued a solo career, incorporating elements of pop, cabaret, and electronic music. His hits include a duet with Gene Pitney on the 1989 UK number one single "Something's Gotten Hold of My Heart". and "Tears Run Rings".

Almond has released numerous albums and collaborated with artists such as Jools Holland, Nico, and Siouxsie Sioux, exploring diverse musical styles ranging from torch songs to Russian folk music. Almond's career spanning over four decades has enjoyed critical and commercial acclaim, and he has sold over 30 million records worldwide. He spent a month in a coma after a near-fatal motorcycle accident in 2004 and later became a patron of the brain trauma charity Headway.

Almond was appointed Officer of the Order of the British Empire (OBE) in the 2018 New Year Honours for services to arts and culture.

== Early life ==
Almond was born in Southport, Sefton, the son of a Norwegian mother, Sandra Mary Diesen and a Scottish father, Peter John Almond, a Second Lieutenant in the King's Liverpool Regiment. He was brought up at his grandparents' house in Birkdale with his younger sister, and as a child suffered from bronchitis and asthma. When he was four, they left their grandparents' house and moved to Starbeck, Harrogate. Two years later they returned to Southport, and then moved to Horsforth, Yorkshire. There, he attended Horsforth Featherbank Infant School.

At the age of 11, Almond attended Aireborough Grammar School near Leeds. He found solace in music, listening to radio pioneer John Peel. The first albums he purchased were the soundtrack of the stage musical Hair and Benefit by Jethro Tull, and the first singles were "Green Manalishi" by Fleetwood Mac and "Witch's Promise" by Jethro Tull. He became a great fan of Marc Bolan and David Bowie, and got a part-time job as a stable boy to fund his music listening. After his parents' divorce in 1972, he moved with his mother back to Southport where he attended King George V School. He gained two O-Levels in Art and English and was accepted onto a General Art and Design course at Southport College, specialising in Performance Art.

Almond applied to Leeds Polytechnic, where he was interviewed by Jeff Nuttall, also a performance artist, who accepted him on the strength of his performing skills. During his time at art college, he did a series of performance theatre pieces: Zazou, Glamour in Squalor, Twilights and Lowlifes, as well as Andy Warhol inspired mini-movies. Zazou was reviewed by The Yorkshire Evening Post and described as "one of the most nihilistic depressing pieces that I have ever had the misfortune to see", prompting Almond to later refer to it as a "success" in his autobiography. He left art college with a 2:1 honours degree. He later credited writer and artist Molly Parkin with discovering him. It was at Leeds Polytechnic that Almond met David Ball, a fellow student; they formed Soft Cell in 1977.

As a child, Almond listened to his parents' record collection, which included his mother's "Let's Dance" by Chris Montez and "The Twist" by Chubby Checker, as well as his father's collection of jazz, including Dave Brubeck and Eartha Kitt. As an adolescent, Almond listened to Radio Caroline and Radio Luxembourg. He listened at first to progressive music, blues, and rock, and bands such as Free, Jethro Tull, Van der Graaf Generator, the Who, and the Doors. He bought the first ever issue of Sounds because it contained a free poster of Jimmy Page. Almond became a fan of Bolan after hearing him on The John Peel Show, buying the T. Rex single "Ride a White Swan". From then on, Almond "followed everything Marc Bolan did" and it was his obsession with Bolan that prompted Almond to adopt the "Marc" spelling of his name. He discovered the songs of Jacques Brel through Bowie as well as Alex Harvey and Dusty Springfield. Brel became a major influence.

== Career ==
=== 1980s ===
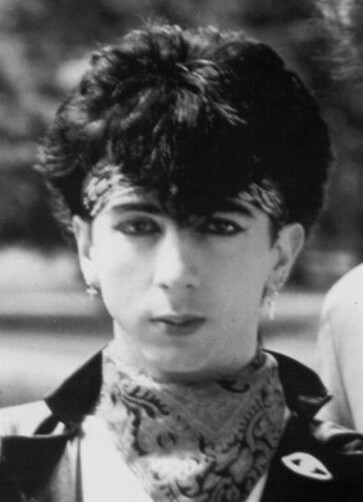
Almond in 1983

Almond and Dave Ball formed the synthesiser-based duo Soft Cell and signed to the Some Bizzare label. Their hits included "Tainted Love" (UK No. 1), "Bedsitter" (UK No. 4), "Say Hello, Wave Goodbye" (UK No. 3), "Torch" (UK No. 2), "What!" (UK No. 3), "Soul Inside" (UK No. 16), and the club hit "Memorabilia". Soft Cell's first release was an independent record (funded by Dave Ball's mother) entitled Mutant Moments via Red Rhino Records in 1980.

"Mutant Moments" came to the attention of music entrepreneur Stevo Pearce, who at the time was compiling a "futurist" chart for the music papers Record Mirror and Sounds which featured young, upcoming and experimental bands of the new wave of electronic sound. He signed the duo to his Some Bizzare label and they enjoyed a string of nine Top 40 hit singles and four Top 20 albums in the UK between 1981 and 1984. They made three records in New York with producer Mike Thorne: their debut Non-Stop Erotic Cabaret (1981), its remix album Non Stop Ecstatic Dancing (1982) and the follow-up The Art of Falling Apart (1983). Almond became involved with the New York Underground Art Scene at this time with writer/DJ Anita Sarko, which led him to meet artists including Andy Warhol and perform at a number of Art events.

"Tainted Love", a cover of a Gloria Jones Northern Soul classic, was number one in the UK and in many countries over the world, and was in the Guinness Book of Records for a while as the record that spent the longest time in the Billboard Hot 100 chart in the US. It also won the best-single award of 1981 at the first Brit Awards. Soft Cell brought an otherwise obscure Northern Soul classic to mass public attention and their version of the song was, as at 2012, the UK's 59th best-selling single of all time, selling over one million copies in the UK.

Almond also became friends with JG Thirlwell and, in 1983, as Clint Ruin, Thirlwell performed with Soft Cell on the Channel 4 show The Switch. Marc travelled to New York with Thirlwell and Nick Cave, where they became part of the Immaculate Consumptive with Lydia Lunch. Almond and Thirlwell continued to work together, ultimately culminating in the Flesh Volcano single in 1987.

In 1982, Almond formed Marc and the Mambas as an offshoot project from Soft Cell. Marc and the Mambas was a loose experimental collective that set the template for the artist that Almond would become. The Mambas at various times included Matt Johnson, Steve James Sherlock, Lee Jenkinson, Peter Ashworth, Jim Thirlwell and Annie Hogan, with whom Almond worked later in his solo career. Under the Mambas moniker, Almond recorded two albums, Untitled (1982) and the double-album Torment and Toreros (1983). He disbanded the collective when it started to feel too much like a regular band.

Soft Cell disbanded in 1984 just before the release of their fourth album, This Last Night in Sodom, but the duo briefly reunited in 2001 and again in 2018.

Marc Almond had a hit early 1985 with "I Feel Love, Johnny Remember Me" with Bronski Beat on the gay-themed album The Age of Consent, released in 1984.

Almond's first proper solo album was Vermin in Ermine, released in 1984. Produced by Mike Hedges, it featured musicians from the Mambas outfit, Annie Hogan, Martin McCarrick and Billy McGee. This ensemble, known as The Willing Sinners, worked alongside Almond for the subsequent albums Stories of Johnny (1985) from which the title track became a minor hit, and Mother Fist and Her Five Daughters (1987), also produced by Mike Hedges. The latter album was highly acclaimed in reviews, with Ned Raggett writing that the 'Mother Fist' album "embraces classic European cabaret to wonderful effect, more so than any American or English rock album since Bowie's Aladdin Sane or Lou Reed's Berlin."

McCarrick left The Willing Sinners in 1987 to join Siouxsie and the Banshees, from which point Hogan and McGee became known as La Magia. Almond signed to EMI and released the album The Stars We Are in 1988. This album featured Almond's version of "Something's Gotten Hold of My Heart", which was later re-recorded as a duet with the song's original singer Gene Pitney and released as a single. The track reached No. 1 in the UK. It also reached number one in Germany and was a major hit in countries around the world. The Stars We Are became his biggest selling solo album in the US, and the single "Tears Run Rings" became his only solo single to peak inside the US Billboard Hot 100.

Almond's other recordings in the 1980s included an album of Brel songs, called Jacques, and an album of dark French chansons originally performed by Juliette Gréco, Serge Lama and Léo Ferré, as well as poems by Rimbaud and Baudelaire set to music. This album was released in 1993 as Absinthe, and was initially recorded in the late 1980s then finished in Paris in the early 1990s.

=== 1990s ===
Almond's first release in the 1990s was the album Enchanted, which spawned the UK Top 30 hit "A Lover Spurned". A further single from the album, "Waifs and Strays", was remixed by Dave Ball who was now in the electronic dance band the Grid. In 1991, Soft Cell returned to the charts with a new remix of "Say Hello Wave Goodbye" followed by a re-release of "Tainted Love" (with a new video). The singles were issued to promote a new Soft Cell/Marc Almond compilation album, Memorabilia - The Singles, which collected some of the biggest hits from Almond's career throughout the previous ten years. The album reached the UK Top 10.

Almond then signed to WEA and released a new solo album, Tenement Symphony. Produced partly by Trevor Horn, the album yielded three Top 40 hits including renditions of the Jacques Brel classic "Jacky" (which made the UK Top 20), and "The Days of Pearly Spencer" which returned Almond to the UK Top 5 in 1992. Later that year, Almond played a lavish one-off show at the Royal Albert Hall in London, which featured an orchestra and dancers as he performed material from his entire career. The show was recorded and released as the CD and video 12 Years of Tears.

In 1993 Almond toured Russia (including Siberia) by invitation of the British consul in Moscow. Accompanied only by Martin Watkins on piano, he played small Soviet halls and theatres, often without amplification, and ended at the "mini Bolshoi" in Moscow. Transmitted live on television Almond made a plea for tolerance of gay people. The tour was fraught with troubles, which Almond detailed in his autobiography, but it marked the beginning of his love affair with the genre of Russian folk torch songs known as Romance.

Almond's next album Fantastic Star saw him part with WEA and sign to Mercury Records. Much of Fantastic Star was originally recorded in New York with Mike Thorne, but later after signing to Mercury, was reworked in London. Almond also recorded a session for the album with John Cale, David Johanson, and Chris Spedding; some made the final cut. Other songs were produced by Mike Hedges and Martyn Ware. Adding to the disjointed recording process was the fact that during recording Almond also spent several weeks attending a treatment centre in Canterbury for addiction to prescription drugs. However, on its release Fantastic Star gave Almond a hit single with "Adored and Explored", and also minor hits and stage favourites such as "The Idol" and "Child Star". Fantastic Star was Almond's last album with WEA and also marked the ending of his managerial relationship with Stevo Pearce.

Almond signed to Echo records in 1998 with a more downbeat and atmospheric electronica album, Open All Night. This featured R&B and trip hop influences, as well as torch songs for which he had become known. The album featured a duet ("Threat of Love") with Siouxsie Sioux as well as one ("Almost Diamonds") with Kelli Ali (then of the Sneaker Pimps). "Black Kiss", "Tragedy" and "My Love" were the singles from the album Open All Night.

=== 2000s ===
Almond moved in 2000 to Moscow where he rented an apartment. With the encouragement and connections of executive producer Misha Kucherenko, he embarked on a three-year recording project of Russian romance and folk songs, called Heart on Snow. Featuring many Russian stars old and new such as Boris Grebenshchikov, Ilya Lagutenko of the Russian band Mumiy Troll, Lyudmila Zykina and Alla Bayanova and featuring The Rossiya Folk Orchestra conducted by Anatole Sobolev, it was the first time that such a project had been undertaken by a Western artist, many of the loved Soviet era songs sung in English for the first time. The album was produced by musician/arranger Andrei Samsonov. Almond performed many times at the famous, and now demolished, Rossiya Concert Hall with Lyudmila Zykina and Alla Bayanova, and with the Rossiya Folk Orchestra.

In 2001, Soft Cell reunited briefly and released their first new album in 18 years, Cruelty Without Beauty. Two singles came out of this album, "Monoculture" and a cover of the Frankie Valli's "The Night", which led to a Top of the Pops appearance for the band, their first since the mid-1980s. Almond also presented New Music Television that year.

Almond released his eleventh studio album, Stranger Things, in 2001.

In June 2007, Almond released an album of cover songs, Stardom Road. Picked to tell a story of his life and career, the album featured songs as diverse as "I Have Lived" by Charles Aznavour, to "Stardom Road" by Third World War, Frank Sinatra's "Strangers in the Night", and "Kitsch" by Paul Ryan. The album featured his first new song since the motorbike accident, "Redeem me (Beauty Will Redeem the World)". Stardom Road was to be one of three albums for the Sanctuary label, the UK's largest independent record label up until 2007 when it got itself into financial difficulty and was sold off in June 2007 to Universal Music Group. In July 2007, Almond celebrated his 50th birthday on stage at the Shepherd's Bush Empire in London and in September performed at a tribute show to Marc Bolan, his teenage hero. At the concert he dueted with Bolan's wife, Gloria Jones, on an impromptu version of "Tainted Love". In October 2007, the fashion house Yves Saint Laurent picked Almond's "Strangers in the Night" to represent their show at London's Fashion Rocks. Almond performed for the event at the Royal Albert Hall.

In 2008 and 2009, Almond toured with Jools Holland throughout the UK as well as guesting at shows by Current 93, Baby Dee and a tribute show to the late folk singer Sandy Denny at the Festival Hall. In October 2009, Almond released his second album of Russian romances and gypsy songs entitled Orpheus in Exile. The album was a tribute to gay Russian singer Vadim Kozin, who was exiled to the gulags of the Arctic Circle. The album was produced by Alexei Fedorov and features an orchestra arranged by Anatole Sobolev.

=== 2010s ===
In June 2010, Almond released Varieté, his first studio album of self written material since Stranger Things in 2001. The album marks Almond's 30th anniversary as a recording artist, a fact he celebrated with a new concert tour in Autumn 2010. Also in the summer of 2010 Almond was named Mojo Hero, an award given by the music magazine Mojo. The award was presented to Almond by Anohni who flew from New York for the occasion.

In 2011, Almond released the Feasting with Panthers album, a collaboration with musician and arranger Michael Cashmore. It featured poetry set to music, including works by Count Eric Stenbock, Jean Genet, Jean Cocteau, Paul Verlaine and Rimbaud. Later in the same year Almond took part in a music-theatre work Ten Plagues, held at Edinburgh's Traverse Theatre, as part of the 2011 Edinburgh Festival Fringe, from 1 to 28 August 2011. Ten Plagues is a one-man song cycle based on Daniel Defoe's Journal of the Plague Year (which dates back to 1722), with metaphors of AIDS and epidemics. It was written for him by Mark Ravenhill and Conor Mitchell. Ten Plagues was awarded a Fringe First Award.

In 2012, Almond took the role of the Roman Stoic philosopher Seneca in the Paris Théâtre du Châtelet's experimental rock adaptation of Poppea, based on Monteverdi's original 17th-century opera The Coronation of Poppea. The production also featured ex-Libertines member Carl Barât, French singer-songwriter Benjamin Biolay, Swedish singer Fredrika Stahl and was directed by ex-Clash drummer Peter Howard. Later that year, on 9 August 2012, Almond performed at Anohni's Meltdown Festival in London's Southbank Centre, reforming Marc and the Mambas to perform their second album Torment and Toreros live for the first time. Anohni has stated that Torment and Toreros was her favourite album throughout her teens and that it became the starting point for Anohni and the Johnsons. Anohni joined the band on stage for one song, singing "My Little Book of Sorrows" with Almond.

In 2013, Almond revived Ten Plagues and performed it for a month at Wilton's Music Hall in London. He also performed with Jethro Tull's Ian Anderson on stage, performing Tull's concept album Thick as a Brick at the Royal Albert Hall. That year Almond also received The Ivor Novello Inspiration Award which was presented to him by longtime friend and co-Manager Vicki Wickham, and was also awarded the Icon Award from Attitude.

Almond released three albums throughout 2014. First was The Tyburn Tree with composer John Harle, a concept album about dark historical London. This was followed by The Dancing Marquis album, made with a number of collaborators including Jarvis Cocker, Carl Barât and Jools Holland, featuring production from Tony Visconti on some tracks. Finally, Almond released a studio recording of his 2011 show, Ten Plagues – A Song Cycle.

In 2014 Almond was awarded a fellowship from Leeds College Of Music and performed several concerts with the colleges Contemporary Orchestra And Pop Choir.

2015 saw the release of The Velvet Trail, an album of original material co-written and produced by Chris Braide. Almond also worked on a song cycle to accompany the filming of a multi media performance of À rebours (translated as Against Nature) by Joris-Karl Huysmans. The score for this project was written by Othon Mataragas with words from Feasting with Panthers collaborator Jeremy Reed. Reed states that he wrote 15 songs for the project commenting that Against Nature is "still probably one of the most decadent books ever written" and that Almond had always wanted to perform it, stating that "now we're both jaded aesthetes we could do it".

In 2016, Almond landed his first major label deal in 20 years, signing a two-album deal with BMG Rights Management. In 2017, the compilation album Hits and Pieces / The Best of Soft Cell & Marc Almond, debuted at number seven in the UK album chart. In September 2017 the album Shadows & Reflections was released, entering the UK chart at No.14.

In 2017 Almond was presented with an honorary Doctorate in Philosophy from Edge Hill University in Ormskirk, Lancashire, close to his hometown of Southport. He also delivered that year's graduation address.

In 2017 Liverpool Gallery, working with DuoVision Art, curated a retrospective exhibition of his life entitled Addicted to Excess.

In September 2018 Soft Cell played the O2 Arena in London celebrating the band's 40-year career.

In January 2019 Marc formed an offshoot rock band called The Loveless with Neal X (Sigue Sigue Sputnik) on guitar and Matt Hector and Ben Ellis (Iggy Pop's band) on drums and bass. They have released four albums including Wild In The Streets (2021), Meet The Loveless (2023) and Live At The 100 Club (2024).

=== 2020s ===
Almond's next solo album, Chaos and a Dancing Star, also written with Braide, was recorded in Los Angeles and released in January 2020. Ian Anderson played flute on the album. During COVID-19 lockdowns, Almond and David Ball wrote a new Soft Cell album, Happiness Not Included, which was released on 6 May 2022. The album contained 12 new tracks, including a collaboration with Pet Shop Boys on the track "Purple Zone", which reached number one in the Official Physical Singles Chart and also the Official Vinyl Singles Chart.

In early 2022, Almond supported Ukraine and released an English-language cover of the Ukrainian folk song, "What A Moonlit Night".

In April 2024, an exhibition of Almond’s personal collage artworks was curated for TCFE Gallery in central London. The exhibition was entitled Deities and Demons.

In July 2024, Almond released his solo album, I’m Not Anyone through BMG. It is an album of cover songs including compositions by Don McLean, King Crimson and Paul Anka. Once again Ian Anderson guested on a track. This was the second of Marc's albums produced by Mike Stephens.

In 2024, Almond's version of I’m Not Anyone was adopted by LGBTQ+ Prides around the world.

In September 2024, Almond toured the UK and Germany with a retrospective concert of cover songs entitled I’m Not Anyone Tour.

In 2025, Almond signed a new Soft Cell album deal with Republic of Music (ROM). The album will be entitled Danceteria.

In 2025, Almond signed a new two album solo deal with Cherry Red Records. The first album is produced by Barry Adamson and will be released in 2027.

In March 2025, Almond toured Australia for the first time as a double bill of Soft Cell and Marc Almond in two halves.

In May and June 2025, Soft Cell toured the US on a 24 date tour with Simple Minds. David Ball's death in October 2025 marked an indefinite end to Soft Cell.

== Personal life ==
Almond formerly divided his time among London, Moscow and Barcelona. He stopped living in Moscow following the Russian invasion of Ukraine, stating in a 2024 interview "I don't think I can see myself ever going back to Moscow now. I think as an Englishman, and as an openly gay man, I'd just be too scared." In the same interview, it was mentioned that he had recently bought a small farm in Portugal.

Almond has stated that he dislikes being pigeon-holed as "a 'gay' artist", saying that such a label "enables people to marginalise your work and reduce its importance, implying that it won't be of any interest to anyone who isn't gay".

In October 2004, Almond was seriously injured in a motorbike accident near St Paul's Cathedral, London. Near death and in a coma for weeks, he suffered two huge blood clots and had to undergo emergency surgery twice. He also suffered serious head injuries, multiple breaks and fractures, a collapsed lung and damaged hearing.

In his autobiography, Almond describes being invited for initiation into Anton LaVey's Church of Satan, and that "not being one to turn down a theatrical moment and a chance to be relegated to the bad book, I immediately said yes." Noise musician Boyd Rice performed the simple ceremony in "a small grotto in a wood" owned by Rose McDowall close to where the Hellfire Club used to meet. Almond states that the ceremony involved "no dancing naked, no bonfires, no blood sacrifice", but even so "every hair on my neck stood on end and sweat broke out on my top lip." Almond later stated in a 2016 interview with Loud and Quiet that the initiation was "a theatrical joke that got a bit out of hand" and that he is not a Satanist. By 2020, Almond had converted to Druidism.

In response to being appointed OBE at the age of 60, Almond said he is still a "little bit" anti-establishment, but added: "I can't really be a rebel any more. I think it's time to leave it to younger people."

In his 1999 autobiography, Almond stated that he has Ménière's syndrome, which has repercussions for his hearing.

Almond is an animal rights campaigner and supporter of the Campaign To Ban Trophy Hunting.

Almond has said that he considers himself to be on the autism spectrum. In an interview with The Times, he stated, "I've always known I'm on the spectrum somewhere." He has also said that he has never received a formal diagnosis.

== Awards and nominations ==
Award	Year	Nominee(s)	Category	Result	Ref.
Brit Awards	1982	Soft Cell	British Breakthrough Act	Nominated	
Brit Awards	1982	"Tainted Love"	British Single of the Year	Won	
Brit Awards	1990	"Something's Gotten Hold of My Heart" (with Gene Pitney)	British Single of the Year	Nominated	
British LGBT Awards	2024	Himself	Music Artist	Nominated	
British LGBT Awards	2024	Himself	Lifetime Achievement Award	Won	
Ivor Novello Awards	2013	Himself	The Ivors Inspiration Award	Won	
Mojo Awards	2010	Himself	Hero Award	Won	
UK Festival Awards	2010	Himself	Feel-Good Act of the Summer	Nominated	

== Discography ==
=== Solo albums ===
- Vermin in Ermine (1984)
- Stories of Johnny (1985)
- Mother Fist and Her Five Daughters (1987)
- The Stars We Are (1988)
- Jacques (1989)
- Enchanted (1990)
- Tenement Symphony (1991)
- Absinthe (1993)
- Fantastic Star (1996)
- Open All Night (1999)
- Stranger Things (2001)
- Heart on Snow (2003)
- Stardom Road (2007)
- Orpheus in Exile (2009)
- Varieté (2010)
- Feasting with Panthers (2011)
- The Tyburn Tree (2014)
- The Dancing Marquis (2014)
- Ten Plagues – A Song Cycle (2014)
- The Velvet Trail (2015)
- Against Nature (2015)
- Silver City Ride (2016)
- Shadows and Reflections (2017)
- How to Destroy Angels (as Coil + Zos Kia + Marc Almond) (2018)
- A Lovely Life to Live (2018)
- Chaos and a Dancing Star (2020)
- I'm Not Anyone (2024)
