= Tainted Love =

1964 song written by Ed Cobb

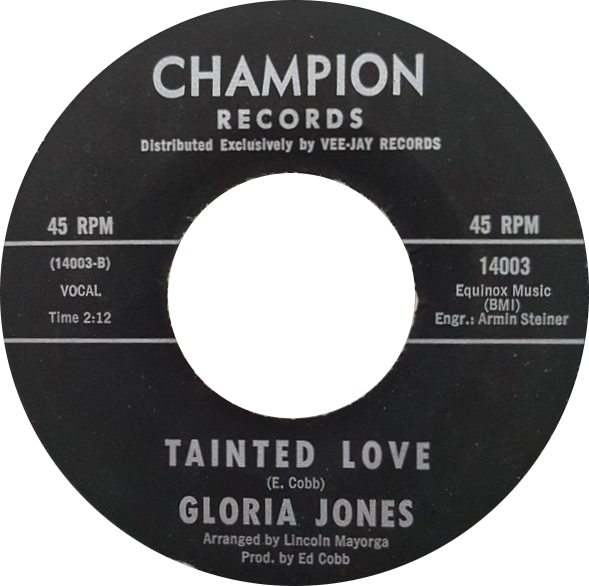
- Side B of official 1965 US single

Single by Gloria Jones
- A-side: "My Bad Boy's Comin' Home"
- Released: May 1965
- Recorded: 1964
- Genre: Soul
- Length: 2:11
- Label: Champion (distributed by Vee-Jay)
- Songwriter: Edward Cobb
- Producer: Ed Cobb

Gloria Jones singles chronology
"My Bad Boy's Comin' Home" / "Tainted Love" (1965)	"Come Go with Me" (1966)

"Tainted Love" is a song composed by Ed Cobb, formerly of American group the Four Preps, which was originally recorded by soul musician Gloria Jones in 1964. In 1981, the song attained worldwide fame after being covered and reworked by British synth-pop duo Soft Cell for their album Non-Stop Erotic Cabaret. The song has since been covered by numerous groups and artists.

== Gloria Jones versions ==
American artist Gloria Jones made the first recording of "Tainted Love" in 1964. Glen Campbell played lead guitar. The song was written and produced by Ed Cobb and arranged by Lincoln Mayorga. It was the B-side of her 1965 single "My Bad Boy's Comin' Home", which was a commercial flop, failing to chart on either the US or the UK. According to Nick Talevski, before Jones recorded the song, Cobb had offered it to the Standells, whom he managed and produced, but they rejected it. The Standells say that the song was never offered to them, and that they were not signed to Cobb's company Greengrass Productions until 1966, some two years after Jones's recording.

In 1973, British club DJ Richard Searling purchased a copy of the almost decade-old single while on a trip to the United States. The track's Motown-influenced sound (featuring a fast tempo, horns, electric rhythm guitar and female backing vocals) fit in perfectly with the music favoured by those involved in the Northern soul scene of the early 1970s. Searling popularised the song at the Northern soul club Va Va's in Bolton, and later at Wigan Casino.

Owing to the new-found underground popularity of the song, Jones re-recorded "Tainted Love" in 1976 and released it as a single, but it also failed to chart. This version was released on her album Vixen and was produced by her boyfriend Marc Bolan.

In 2014, NME ranked Jones' version number 305 in their list of the 500 Greatest Songs of All Time.

The 1964 version is featured in Grand Theft Auto: San Andreas, while the 1976 re-recording is featured in Grand Theft Auto Online.

=== Certifications ===
Region	Certification	Certified units/sales
United Kingdom (BPI)	Silver	200,000^{‡}
^{‡} Sales+streaming figures based on certification alone.

== Soft Cell version ==
"Tainted Love"
- Artwork for original 1981 release

Single by Soft Cell

from the album Non-Stop Erotic Cabaret
- A-side: "Where Did Our Love Go"
- B-side: "Memorabilia"; "Tainted Dub"
- Released: July 1981
- Genre: Synth-pop; new wave
- Length: 2:41 (single version); 2:34 (album version)
- Label: Some Bizzare; Sire, Warner Bros. (US)
- Songwriter: Ed Cobb
- Producer: Mike Thorne

Soft Cell singles chronology
"Memorabilia" (1981)	"Tainted Love" (1981)	"Bedsitter" (1981)

Music video
- "Tainted Love" on YouTube

British synth-pop duo Soft Cell became aware of "Tainted Love" through its status as a "Northern soul" hit in the UK. In 2010, DJ Ian "Frank" Dewhirst claimed he was the first person to play the song for Marc Almond, the vocalist for Soft Cell. Some time after, Soft Cell began performing the song in their live setlist, choosing it instead of Frankie Valli and the Four Seasons' "The Night" (a song they would go on to record in 2003). Eventually, a Phonogram Records A&R manager Roger Ames opted the band to record the single at a London-based Advision Studios, with producer Mike Thorne. There, Soft Cell's version was recorded in a day and a half with Almond's first vocal take being used on the record.

Thorne commented that he was surprised by the choice as he had not been impressed by Jones's 1976 version on hearing it, but was impressed by the new arrangement and Almond's sinister vocal: "You could smell the coke on that second, Northern Soul version, it was really so over-ramped and so frantic. It was good for the dance floor, but I didn't like the record...when Soft Cell performed the song I heard a very novel sound and a very nice voice, so off we went." Notably, Almond has stated in interviews that Soft Cell's version was inspired more by the 1975 version by English singer Ruth Swann (later known as Jill Saward) than that of Gloria Jones. 1980s peer Andy McCluskey (of OMD) noted how Soft Cell's version employed a "simple bed" of electronics that "allowed Marc Almond to really do his stuff on the top".

Phonogram Records chose to release "Tainted Love" in 1981 as Soft Cell's second single (their first was "Memorabilia", which did not chart). The label's representatives implied that this single would be Soft Cell's final release on Some Bizzare if it did not sell. The 12-inch single version (extended dance version) is a medley, transitioning to a cover of the Supremes' "Where Did Our Love Go" halfway through the song. Marc Almond said that this decision was not the duo's, recounting, "If only we'd put our own song on it then we would be considerably richer", while David Ball described the medley as "the most costly idea of our career".

Following a performance on the BBC's Top of the Pops chart show, "Tainted Love" reached number one on the UK Singles Chart, and was known as the best-selling single of 1981 in the UK, until the Official Charts Company recalculated the data in 2021 (giving the title to "Don't You Want Me" by The Human League). "Tainted Love" had 1.05 million sales in the UK in 1981, with that total increasing to 1.35 million copies as of August 2017. In 2023, it was listed as the 59th best-selling single of all time in the UK.

Buoyed by the then-dominant new wave sound of the time and released on their album Non-Stop Erotic Cabaret, "Tainted Love" became a major hit in the US during the Second British Invasion, with the song spending a then-record breaking 43 weeks on the US Billboard Hot 100. On the US chart dated January 16, 1982, the song entered the Billboard Hot 100 at number 90. It appeared to peak at number 64 and fell to number 100 on February 27. After spending a second week at number 100, it started climbing again. It took 19 weeks to crack the American Top 40 and reached number 8 during the summer of 1982.

"Soft Cell, a tweezy synthesizer and singer duo whose fondest subject was sexual perversion, had a huge turntable hit in the clubs with "Tainted Love", which then crossed over to radio, enjoying the longest tenure, at forty-three weeks, of any single in Billboard history."

— Anglomania: The Second British Invasion, by Parke Puterbaugh for Rolling Stone, November 1983.

A video was recorded specially for Soft Cell's video album Non-Stop Exotic Video Show, directed by Tim Pope and featuring David Ball as a cricketer meeting Marc Almond in a toga on what seems to be Mount Olympus.

In 1996, director Spike Jonze used Soft Cell's version of the song in a television commercial for Levi's jeans, titled "Doctors", syncing the song to the sound of a heart rate monitor in a hospital. The television commercial was nominated for an Emmy Award for Outstanding Commercial at the 49th Primetime Emmy Awards the following year.

In 2013, Soft Cell's version of "Tainted Love" ranked number five on VH1's 100 Greatest One Hit Wonders of the 1980s. It was also heavily sampled on Rihanna's 2006 single "SOS" from her album A Girl Like Me and the Veronicas' 2007 single "Hook Me Up" from their album Hook Me Up. In 2015, the song was voted by the British public as the nation's fourth favourite 1980s number one in a poll for ITV. In 2022, Rolling Stone ranked "Tainted Love" number 170 with "Where Did Our Love Go" in their list of the "200 Greatest Dance Songs of All Time".

=== Tainted Love '91 ===
A re-recorded version, titled "Tainted Love '91", was issued in 1991, seven years after Soft Cell's dissolution in 1984, as a tie-in to the compilation album Memorabilia – The Singles (which reached number eight in the UK Albums Chart in June 1991). "Tainted Love '91" was a follow-up to "Say Hello, Wave Goodbye '91", which was another re-recorded/remixed version of an earlier single from the Soft Cell/Marc Almond compilation. "Tainted Love '91" became another top-40 hit from the collection and peaked at number five in the UK charts, making it Soft Cell's sixth top-10 hit (as records with re-recorded vocals were seen as a new hit by the chart compilers of the time)

The video for this version, directed by Peter Christopherson, features a man pacing at night and dancing with starry apparitions, while Almond sings amongst the stars. Christopherson's band Coil had covered "Tainted Love" in 1985, with a music video that included a cameo appearance by Almond.

=== Charts ===
==== Weekly charts ====
Chart (1981–1982)	Peak position
Australia (Kent Music Report)	1
Austria (Ö3 Austria Top 40)	2
Belgium (Ultratop 50 Flanders)	1
Canada Top Singles (RPM)	1
France (SNEP)	4
Ireland (IRMA)	4
Netherlands (Dutch Top 40)	5
Netherlands (Single Top 100)	7
New Zealand (Recorded Music NZ)	2
South Africa (Springbok Radio)	1
Spain (AFYVE)	4
Sweden (Sverigetopplistan)	4
Switzerland (Schweizer Hitparade)	2
UK Singles (OCC)	1
US Billboard Hot 100	8
US Disco Top 80 (Billboard) with "Where Did Our Love Go"	4
US Rock Top Tracks (Billboard)	12
West Germany (GfK)	1

Chart (1985)	Peak position
UK Singles (OCC)	43

Chart (1991)	Peak position
Ireland (IRMA)	4
Luxembourg (Radio Luxembourg)	5
UK Singles (OCC)	5
UK Airplay (Music Week)	14
UK Dance (Music Week)	30

Chart (1999)	Peak position
US Dance Club Play (Billboard)	24
US Maxi-Singles Sales (Billboard)	6

==== Year-end charts ====
Chart (1981)	Position
Belgium (Ultratop 50 Flanders)	28
Netherlands (Dutch Top 40)	58
Netherlands (Single Top 100)	49
UK Singles (OCC)	2

Chart (1982)	Position
Australia (Kent Music Report)	3
Canada Top Singles (RPM)	7
New Zealand (RIANZ)	14
South Africa (Springbok Radio)	5
US Billboard Hot 100	11
West Germany (Media Control)	35

Chart (1991)	Position
UK Singles (OCC)	82

=== Certifications ===
Region	Certification	Certified units/sales
Australia (ARIA)	Gold	50,000^{^}
Canada (Music Canada)	Platinum	100,000^{^}
Denmark (IFPI Danmark)	Platinum	90,000^{‡}
Germany (BVMI)	Platinum	600,000^{‡}
Italy (FIMI) sales since 2009	Platinum	100,000^{‡}
New Zealand (RMNZ)	3× Platinum	90,000^{‡}
Spain (Promusicae) Remaster 2021	Platinum	60,000^{‡}
United Kingdom (BPI)	4× Platinum	2,400,000^{‡}
^{^} Shipments figures based on certification alone.^{‡} Sales+streaming figures based on certification alone.

== Marilyn Manson version ==
"Tainted Love"

Single by Marilyn Manson

from the album Not Another Teen Movie soundtrack
- Released: November 13, 2001
- Genre: Electronic rock
- Length: 3:20
- Label: Maverick; Warner Bros.
- Songwriter: Ed Cobb
- Producers: Marilyn Manson; Tim Sköld

Marilyn Manson singles chronology
"The Nobodies" (2001)	"Tainted Love" (2001)	"Mobscene" (2003)

American rock band Marilyn Manson covered "Tainted Love" with an arrangement based on Soft Cell's version. It was released in November 2001 as a single from the Not Another Teen Movie soundtrack. The accompanying music video featured cast members Chyler Leigh, Mia Kirshner, Chris Evans and Jaime Pressly. It was later included as a bonus track on international editions of the band's following album, The Golden Age of Grotesque in 2003. Manson said that he was not "really thinking about '80s nostalgia" during the recording, while recognizing it as a main concept behind the soundtrack.

"Tainted Love" topped the charts in Portugal and peaked within the top ten of the charts in the United Kingdom. It also peaked within the top ten of the charts throughout the rest of Europe, including Austria, Denmark, Germany, Italy and Norway. It was nominated for the Kerrang! Award for Best Single in 2002, and won the Kerrang! Award for Best Video. It was also nominated for Best Video at the 2002 Q Awards.

=== Charts ===
==== Weekly charts ====
Chart (2001–2002)	Peak position
Austria (Ö3 Austria Top 40)	2
Belgium (Ultratop 50 Flanders)	11
Belgium (Ultratop 50 Wallonia)	7
Denmark (Tracklisten)	3
Europe (Eurochart Hot 100)	3
Finland (Suomen virallinen lista)	11
France (SNEP)	25
Germany (GfK)	3
Hungary (Single Top 40)	3
Ireland (IRMA)	11
Italy (FIMI)	2
Netherlands (Single Top 100)	44
Norway (VG-lista)	7
Portugal (Billboard)	1
Scottish Singles Sales (Official Charts)	4
Spain (Promusicae)	4
Sweden (Sverigetopplistan)	11
Switzerland (Schweizer Hitparade)	2
UK Singles (OCC)	5
US Mainstream Rock Tracks (Billboard)	30
US Modern Rock Tracks (Billboard)	33

==== Year-end charts ====
Chart (2002)	Position
Austria (Ö3 Austria Top 40)	18
Belgium (Ultratop 50 Flanders)	55
Belgium (Ultratop 50 Wallonia)	17
Europe (Eurochart Hot 100)	25
Germany (Media Control)	24
Ireland (IRMA)	77
Italy (FIMI)	16
Sweden (Hitlistan)	37
Switzerland (Schweizer Hitparade)	19
UK Singles (OCC)	65

=== Certifications ===
Region	Certification	Certified units/sales
Austria (IFPI Austria)	Gold	20,000^{*}
Belgium (BRMA)	Gold	25,000^{*}
Germany (BVMI)	Gold	250,000^{‡}
New Zealand (RMNZ)	Gold	15,000^{‡}
United Kingdom (BPI)	Gold	400,000^{‡}
^{*} Sales figures based on certification alone.^{‡} Sales+streaming figures based on certification alone.

=== Release history ===
Region	Date	Format(s)	Label(s)	Ref.
United States	November 13, 2001	Mainstream rock; active rock; alternative radio	Maverick; Warner Bros.	
United Kingdom	March 18, 2002	CD	Maverick; Warner Bros.	
Japan	May 9, 2002	CD	Maverick	

== Bibliography ==
- Almond, Marc (1999). Tainted Life. London: Sidgwick & Jackson. ISBN 0-283-06340-8 – via the Internet Archive.
- Bielefeldt, Christian & Pendzich, Mark (2011). "Spot checks of pop history: The cover recordings of 'Stand By Me' and 'Tainted Love'". Lied und Populäre Kultur / Song and Popular Culture. 56: 97–111. JSTOR 23339032.
- Davis, Sharon (2012). "September 1981. Soft Cell: Tainted Love". 80s Chart-Toppers: Every Chart-Topper Tells a Story. Random House. ISBN 978-1-7805-7411-0.
- Haslam, Dave (1999). Manchester, England: The Story of the Pop Cult City. Fourth Estate. ISBN 978-1-8411-5145-8.
- Miller, Chuck (2011). Tracy L. Schmidt (ed.). Warman's American Records. Krause Publications. p. 119. ISBN 978-1-4402-2821-6.
- Talevski, Nick (2006). Knocking on Heaven's Door: Rock Obituaries. Omnibus Press. p. 90. ISBN 1-84609-091-1.
