= Say Hello, Wave Goodbye =

Single by Soft Cell

from the album Non-Stop Erotic Cabaret
- B-side: "Say Hello, Wave Goodbye" (Instrumental); Fun City (12")
- Released: January 1982
- Recorded: 1981
- Genre: Synth-pop; electropop
- Length: 5:24
- Label: Some Bizzare; BZS 7
- Songwriters: Marc Almond, David Ball
- Producer: Mike Thorne

Soft Cell singles chronology
"Bedsitter" (1981)	"Say Hello, Wave Goodbye" (1982)	"Torch" (1982)

Music video
- "Say Hello, Wave Goodbye" on YouTube

"Say Hello, Wave Goodbye" is a song from the album Non-Stop Erotic Cabaret by English synth-pop duo Soft Cell that was released as a single in January 1982 and reached number three on the UK Singles Chart. The clarinet which can be heard in the beginning of the Extended Version is played by Dave Tofani.

In 1991, the track was remixed by Julian Mendelsohn and released as "Say Hello, Wave Goodbye '91" to promote the compilation album Memorabilia – The Singles, making no. 38 on the UK Singles Chart. Soft Cell vocalist Marc Almond re-recorded his vocals for the new version. It was ranked number 65 on Rolling Stone magazine's list of the 100 Best Songs of 1982 and ranked 12 on Classic Pop magazine's list of the 40 best synth-pop songs.

== Music video ==
A promotional video was made featuring the British actress Eileen Daly. The video and the song are set in a fictional Pink Flamingo club, inspired by a real Pink Piano bar in Brewer Street, Soho, and unrelated with the then-closed Flamingo Club.

== Cover versions ==
The lyrics "Take your hands off me / I don't belong to you" were used in Legião Urbana's song "Será" on their 1985 debut album.

The song was covered by British artist David Gray and released on his successful 1998 album White Ladder. It was the album's fifth proper and final single and reached #26 on the UK Singles Chart. Gray's version features additional lines at the end from the Van Morrison songs "Madame George" and "Into the Mystic".
