= Soft Cell =

English synthpop duo

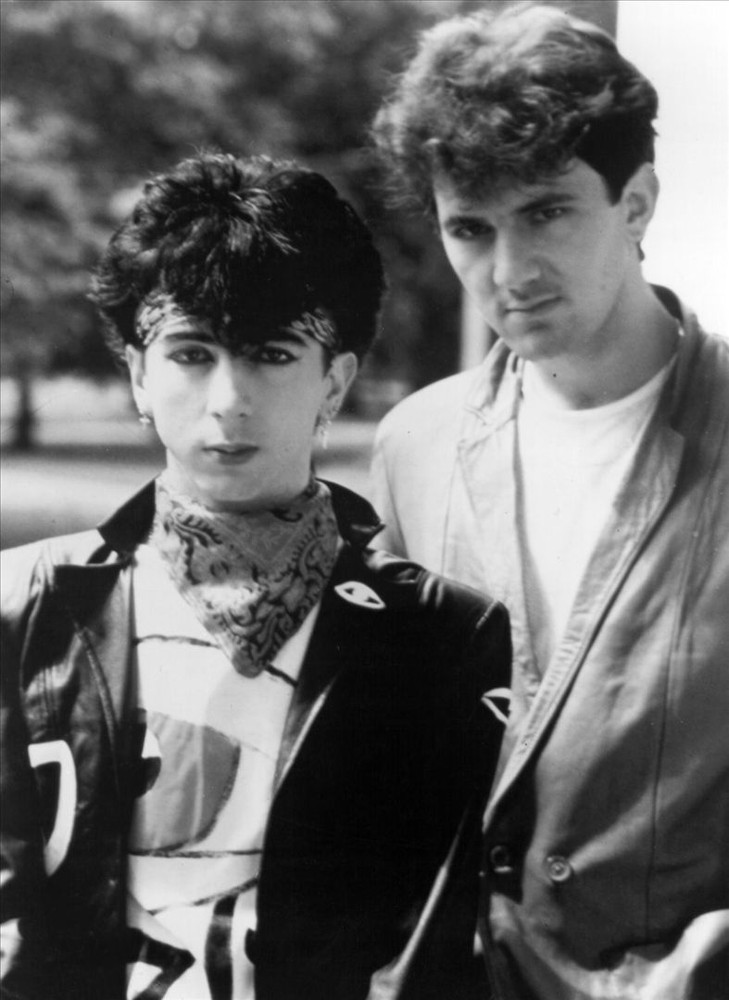
- Soft Cell in 1983; Marc Almond (left) and David Ball (right).

Background information
- Origin: Leeds, West Yorkshire, England
- Genres: Synth-pop; new wave; dark wave
- Years active: 1978–1984; 1991; 2000–2005; 2018–present
- Labels: Some Bizzare; Mute; Sire; BMG
- Members: Marc Almond
- Past members: David Ball
- Website: softcell.co.uk

Soft Cell are an English synth-pop band who came to prominence in the early 1980s. They consisted of vocalist Marc Almond and instrumentalist David Ball until the latter's death in 2025. The band are primarily known for their 1981 hit version of "Tainted Love" and their platinum-selling debut album Non-Stop Erotic Cabaret.

In the United Kingdom, Soft Cell had twelve top 40 hits, including "Tainted Love" (No. 1), "Torch" (No. 2), "Say Hello, Wave Goodbye", "What" (both No. 3), and "Bedsitter" (No. 4). They also had four top 20 albums between 1981 and 1984. The duo split in 1984 but reformed in 2001 to tour and release a new album. They held a reunion concert in London on 30 September 2018, stating it would be their last live UK performance as a duo but that they may still perform abroad and record together.

Soft Cell's songs have been covered by several artists, including David Gray, Coil and Nine Inch Nails. Their track "Memorabilia" earned recognition for the band as pioneers of the synth-oriented techno genre. The duo have sold in excess of ten million records world-wide.

== History ==
=== Mutant Moments and "Memorabilia" ===
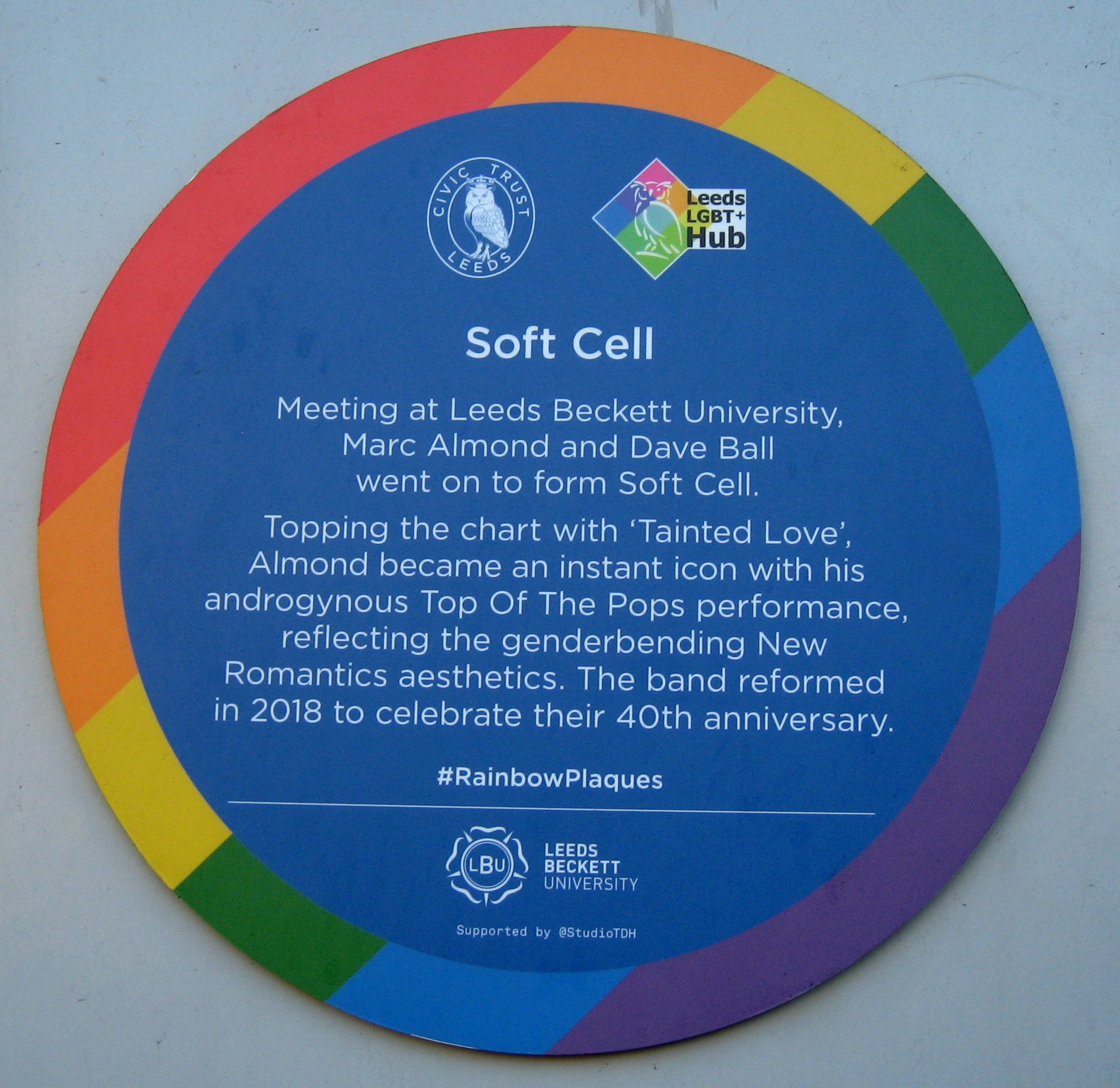
Plaque honouring Soft Cell at Leeds Beckett University (formerly Leeds Polytechnic)

Soft Cell were formed in 1978, after Almond and Ball had met at Leeds Polytechnic in the previous year. According to Ball, the duo were brought together by their common interest in writing "catchy but twisted pop songs" that were "like Throbbing Gristle and Cabaret Voltaire but a bit more lyrical." Their initial efforts at recording resulted in an EP titled Mutant Moments, released in 1980 and which was funded by a loan of £2,000 from Dave Ball's mother and made with a simple two-track recorder.

Soft Cell's next recording, "The Girl with the Patent Leather Face", appeared as a contribution to the Some Bizzare Album, which included Depeche Mode, the The, and Blancmange. The duo ultimately signed to the Some Bizzare label, backed by Phonogram Records. Their first single, "A Man Could Get Lost" b/w "Memorabilia" on 7" and "Memorabilia" b/w "Persuasion" on 12", was produced by Daniel Miller who founded Mute Records, "Memorabilia" was a success in nightclubs, but did not enter the UK singles chart.

=== "Tainted Love" ===
After the chart failure of "Memorabilia", Phonogram Records allowed Soft Cell to record a second and final single in an attempt to score a chart success. The band opted to record a cover version of "Tainted Love", an obscure 1965 Northern soul track originally released by Gloria Jones (the girlfriend of Marc Bolan at the time of his death) and written by Ed Cobb of the Four Preps.

Released in 1981, Soft Cell's "Tainted Love" was a No. 1 hit in 17 countries, including the United Kingdom, where it was the second best selling single of 1981 after selling 1.05 million copies (a total which increased to 1.35 million copies by August 2017).

In 1982, "Tainted Love" became a No. 8 single in the United States and went on to set a Guinness World Record at the time for the longest consecutive stay (43 weeks) on the US Billboard Hot 100 chart. The song's popularity developed slowly, needing 19 weeks to enter the US Top 40. The A-side of the 12-inch single of "Tainted Love" actually featured a two-song medley, with "Tainted Love" blending into the Motown classic "Where Did Our Love Go" (originally recorded by the Supremes in 1964).

=== Non-Stop Erotic Cabaret ===
The duo's first album, Non-Stop Erotic Cabaret, hit UK No. 5 and further explored the now-trademark Soft Cell themes of squalor and sleaze. "Seedy Films" talks of long nights in porno cinemas, while "Frustration" and "Secret Life" deal with the boredom and hypocrisy associated with suburban life. A companion video titled Non-Stop Exotic Video Show was released in 1982 and with videos directed by Tim Pope. The video generated some controversy in Britain, mainly due to a scandal involved with the "Sex Dwarf" clip.

Non-Stop Erotic Cabaret garnered two additional hits: "Bedsitter" dealt with the loneliness and lifestyle of a young man having recently left home to live in a bedsit while partying hard. "Bedsitter" reached No. 4 in the UK Singles Chart in November 1981. The song was highly acclaimed in a retrospective review by AllMusic journalist Ned Raggett who wrote that it "ranks as one of the best, most realistic portrayals of urban life recorded." The final single on the album, the ballad "Say Hello, Wave Goodbye", peaked at No. 3 in February 1982.

During 1982, the duo spent most of their time recording and relaxing in New York City, where they met a woman named Cindy Ecstasy who Almond would later confirm was his drug supplier (it was Cindy Ecstasy who introduced them to the new nightclub drug of the same name). Soon after "Say Hello Wave Goodbye" dropped out of the chart, Soft Cell released a brand new song: "Torch", a love song which was to prove the closest the band ever got to having a No. 1 hit with one of their own songs. The song entered straight into the Top 20 and peaked at No. 2.

In June 1982, as was the trend at the time, the duo released a mini album titled Non Stop Ecstatic Dancing, containing remixes of older material along with their new single, "What!", which is a cover of the 1965 song by Melinda Marx, which was later covered in 1968 by Judy Street, whose version became extremely popular on the Northern Soul scene."What!" was a major hit in the UK and reached No. 3 on the UK Singles Chart in August that year.

=== Decline and dissolution ===
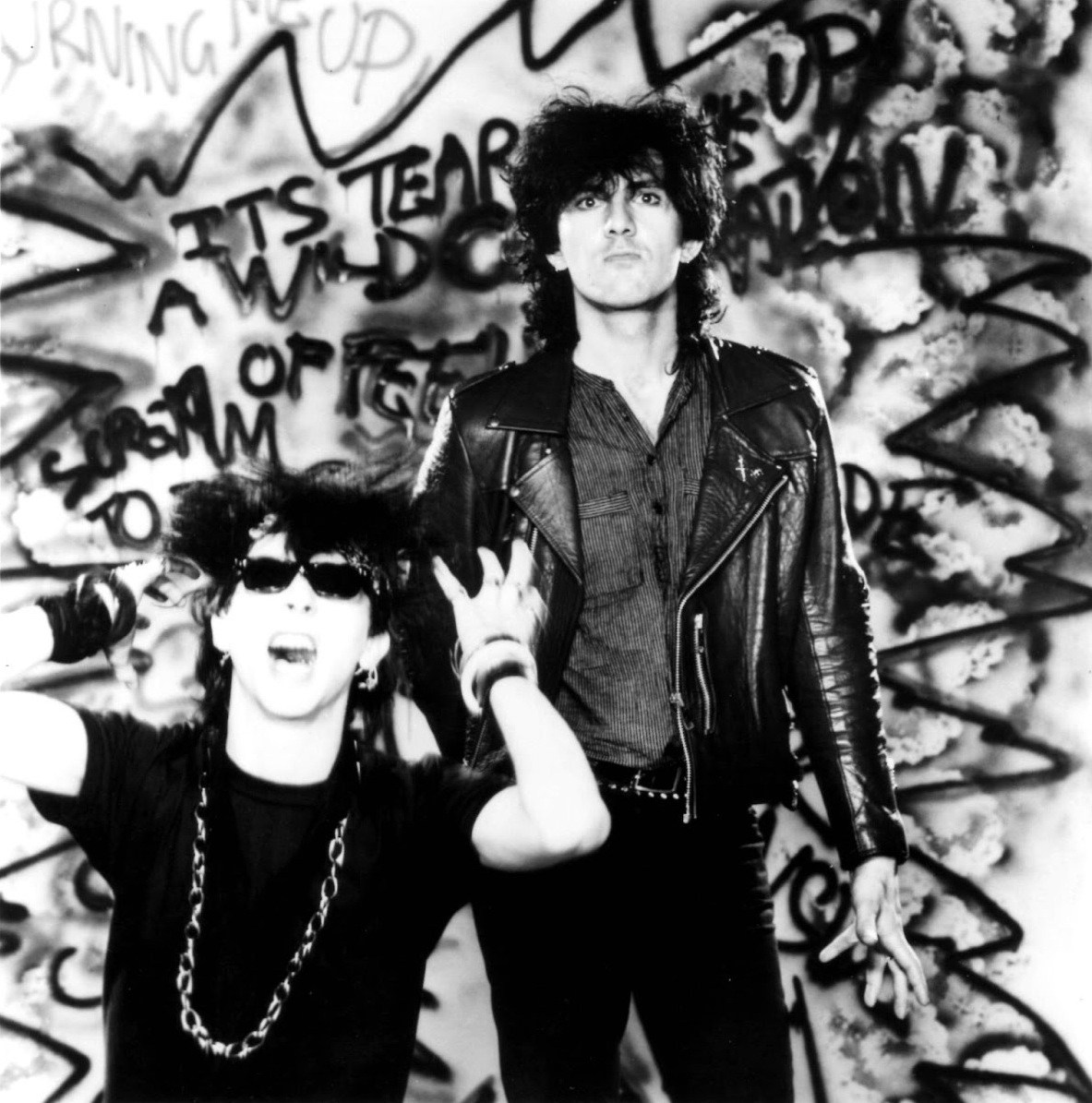
Soft Cell in 1983

By 1983, fame and nearly constant drug use were having a bad effect on the duo. Marc Almond also formed the group Marc and the Mambas, featuring collaborations with the The's Matt Johnson and future Almond collaborator Annie Hogan, as an offshoot to experiment out of the glare of the Soft Cell spotlight. Soft Cell's third album release, titled The Art of Falling Apart, was a Top 5 hit in the UK but the singles were only modest successes. The first single "Where The Heart Is" only reached 21, while the double A-side "Numbers"/"Barriers" peaked at 25. "Numbers" also generated controversy due to references in the song to the drug speed.

In September 1983, the duo released a new single "Soul Inside", which returned them to the UK Top 20, but by early 1984 the duo had amicably decided to end Soft Cell. They played farewell concerts at Hammersmith Palais in January, and released one final album called This Last Night in Sodom (UK No. 12) in March. The album's second and final single "Down in the Subway" (UK No. 24), had already been released in February 1984.

=== Reunions ===
Almond and Ball reunited as Soft Cell in 2000 with a series of live dates. They performed at the opening of the Ocean nightclub in London during March 2001. A mini-tour followed later in the year. The track "God Shaped Hole" featured on the Some Bizzare compilation titled I'd Rather Shout at a Returning Echo than Kid Someone's Listening, released during 2001. A new Soft Cell album, Cruelty Without Beauty, was released during late 2002, followed by a European tour and a small US tour during early 2003. The second single from the album, a cover of the Four Seasons' "The Night", reached No. 39 in the UK. Soft Cell had considered recording "The Night" in place of "Tainted Love" during 1981, though keyboardist David Ball stated in a 2003 interview with the BBC, "I think history has kind of shown that we did make the right choice [in 1981]".

In 2005, they released an album compiling some of their early demo recordings called the Bedsit Tapes. Another similar compilation entitled Demo Non Stop was also released around this time.

In November 2008, the band released a remix album entitled Heat. The album included Soft Cell tracks remixed by such acts as Paul Dakeyne, the Grid, Manhattan Clique, Cicada, Richard X, Ladytron, MHC, Atomizer, Mark Moore, Spektrum, The Dark Poets and many more.

In February 2018, Soft Cell announced that they would reunite for one last UK reunion concert. On 21 August 2018, Almond revealed on the Chris Evans Breakfast Show on BBC Radio 2 that Soft Cell were releasing two new tracks ahead of the concert: "Northern Lights" and "Guilty (Cos I Say You Are)". Entitled "Say Hello, Wave Goodbye", the reunion concert took place at the O2 Arena in London on 30 September 2018. It was stated this was their final live UK show as a duo, but that they may still perform abroad and record material together.

In 2019, Ball said a new Soft Cell album was in the works. In May 2019, the To Show You, I've Been There book was released, which came with a vinyl copy of the Magick Mutants EP, a sequel to their debut Mutant Moments EP.

In June 2020, the Mutant Moments EP received its first official release. Originally to be part of the UK June Record Store Day 2020, the 10 inch EP was sold directly through the band's website, as the event was cancelled due to the ongoing COVID-19 pandemic.

In July 2021, the duo announced that their new album would be called Happiness Not Included and would feature tracks such as "Heart Like Chernobyl", "Light Sleepers" and "Nostalgia Machine". The album was released in May 2022, 20 years after their previous studio album release, with Dave Ball revealing Pet Shop Boys were working on a remix for a forthcoming single.

Despite claiming their 2018 reunion show would be the last in the UK, Soft Cell reunited again for 5 performances in 2021. The short tour was to mark 40 years of the Non-Stop Erotic Cabaret album, with the band performing the album in full, as well as some hits and new material. The run began at the O2 Academy in Glasgow, Scotland on 10 November and ended at the London Hammersmith Apollo on 16 November. In August 2022, the duo brought the tour to North America for another six shows. On 11 August 2023, Soft Cell played the Audley End estate as part of Heritage Live, topping a bill that included 1980s peers OMD and Heaven 17. On 16 September, they opened the BBC Radio 2 "Live in the Park" event in Victoria Park, Leicester.

In 2025, the band toured Australia for the first time, and supported Simple Minds on their US tour. For these performances, co-producer Philip Larsen stood in for Dave Ball, who was unable to travel abroad due to his declining health. On 16 August 2025, the band headlined the UK's Rewind Festival, marking what would become Soft Cell's final live performance with Ball.

Ball died in his sleep at his home on 22 October 2025, at the age of 66. His death came shortly after the completion of a new album, Danceteria, which was released on 25 September 2026. In 2026, Soft Cell will support The Human League on a 21-date US tour, on which Larsen will again stand in for Ball. Almond clarified in a statement that Danceteria "will be the end of any new studio music from Soft Cell because recording without Dave just wouldn't be Soft Cell."

== Influences and legacy ==
The group cited David Bowie, Marc Bolan and Suicide as primary influences. Almond also named Siouxsie Sioux as a major influence for his early performance style, as well as Peter Hammill of Van der Graaf Generator.

Soft Cell is considered a pioneering synth-pop and techno act. They have been cited as an influence by artists including Pet Shop Boys, Erasure, Charli XCX, Nine Inch Nails, and Marilyn Manson.

== Discography ==
- Non-Stop Erotic Cabaret (1981)
- The Art of Falling Apart (1983)
- This Last Night in Sodom (1984)
- Cruelty Without Beauty (2002)
- Happiness Not Included (2022)
- Danceteria (2026)
