= Torch (song) =

Single by Soft Cell
- B-side: "Insecure Me"
- Released: 7 May 1982
- Genre: Synth-pop; new wave
- Length: 4:08
- Label: Some Bizzare
- Songwriters: Marc Almond, David Ball
- Producer: Mike Thorne

Soft Cell singles chronology
"Say Hello, Wave Goodbye" (1982)	"Torch" (1982)	"What!" (1982)

Music video
- "Torch" on YouTube

"Torch" is a song by English synth-pop duo Soft Cell. It was released as a single in 1982, and in mid-June peaked at number two on the UK Singles Chart, ranking 45 for the year. It also reached number 31 on the Hot Dance Club Play chart, number 12 in the Netherlands and number 6 in the Flemish Ultratop 50.

Singer Marc Almond duets towards the end of the song with Cindy Ecstasy, an American clubgoer the band had met at the after-hours bar Club Berlin in New York the year previously. It also features a prominent trumpet solo by John Gatchell.

The single was originally intended to be double A-sided, coupled with the eventual B-side song "Insecure Me"; as such, both songs were included in the band's 2018 singles compilation Keychains & Snowstorms: The Singles.

"Torch" ranked 49 in the New Musical Express critics' list of the year's 50 best singles.

== Charts ==
Chart (1982)	Peak position
Australia (Kent Music Report)	68
Belgium (Ultratop 50 Flanders)	6
Ireland (IRMA)	7
Netherlands (Single Top 100)	12
UK Singles (OCC)	2
West Germany (GfK)	75
