= Some Bizzare Records =

British record label

- Founded: 1981
- Founder: Stevo Pearce
- Distributor: Some Bizzare
- Genre: Experimental, electronic, post-punk
- Country of origin: UK
- Official website: somebizzare.com

Some Bizzare Records is a British independent record label owned by Stevo Pearce. (Note: The name intentionally misspelled; see § Name) The label was founded in 1981, with the release of Some Bizzare Album, a compilation of unsigned bands including Depeche Mode, Soft Cell, The The, Neu Electrikk and Blancmange.

== History ==
=== 1981–1989 ===
One of the first bands that Some Bizzare worked with was B-Movie. After working with B-Movie the label achieved notable success with Soft Cell, an electronic duo whose Mutant Moments EP Stevo Pearce had championed in Sounds. After Soft Cell signed to Some Bizzare, he went on to manage them, under a deal with Phonogram Inc. Their cover of "Tainted Love" topped the charts.

In the early eighties, Stevo Pearce gained a reputation for being a maverick. He licensed The The's Soul Mining album to three different record labels: after delivering the album to Phonogram he then took it from them and sold it to Warner Bros. Records, then sold it on again to CBS. The one recording was sold to three companies, each time signed off for the best deal by the companies mentioned. Soul Mining was eventually released in 1983. The The released further albums with Some Bizzare, including Infected in 1986. Matt Johnson from The The also recorded with Some Bizzare act Marc and the Mambas.

Later acts on the record label's roster included Cabaret Voltaire, Psychic TV, Test Department, Einstürzende Neubauten, Coil, Swans, and Scraping Foetus Off the Wheel. Many of these bands were included on the label's 1985 compilation album If You Can't Please Yourself, You Can't Please Your Soul.

=== 1990–2025 ===
Some Bizzare built a reputation for madcap behavior. For example, during the nineties Stevo Pearce's offices, based in Mayfair, included a private chapel and confession box for would-be-signings to go through the solemn hand-over of demo tapes. Stevo was also partial to aggressively insulting young record shop employees at this time, should they be unfortunate enough to be working in a shop that sold Coil's recordings (the recordings that they made money from at that period in time).

2001 saw Stevo Pearce compile a new compilation album titled I'd Rather Shout at a Returning Echo Than Kid Someone's Listening. It included the Soft Cell track "God Shaped Hole", recorded by the newly reformed band. The compilation also saw the inclusion of two tracks recorded by Cabaret Voltaire's Richard H. Kirk. Between 2001 and 2005, Some Bizzare's output was minimal.

In 2006, Some Bizzare signed acts the Dark Poets, Monkey Farm Frankenstein, Meka and Mainstream Distortion. The compilation album Redefining the Prologue was released in October 2006 to mark the label's 25th anniversary and provides an overview of the label's output. This album coincided with a Some Bizzare exhibition at the Horse Hospital arts venue in Bloomsbury, London. The exhibition included original artwork from bands like The The and Marc and the Mambas.

2007 saw Some Bizzare Records sign some new acts, including Pedro INF, a Portuguese dance music producer, and UK artist Kontour, releasing the album Scanners. These new artists were featured on the Some Bizzare Double Album compilation released in 2008. The album featured 32 new artists discovered on Myspace. Other acts included Risqué, who were a French/Welsh electronic group made up of Nathalie and Huw Williams. Their music consisted of robust driving rhythms and ethereal vocals. They record their music in a studio based in Barcelona. Huw Williams is a well established producer working with bands like "Rubikon" and "Rookie". The album Tie Me Up, Tie Me Down was released by Some Bizzare in August 2009.

The band Einstürzende Neubauten actively discourages purchasing any of their releases from Some Bizzare or their American licensee, Thirsty Ear, as they have been and continue to be sold without paying any royalties to the band.

Stevo has since resurfaced alongside the new Some Bizzare Book "Conform to Deform", written by Wesley Doyle which released in February 2023.

=== 2025–present ===
On October 15, 2025, the label was relaunched as a new digital platform, called the Some Bizzare Network. Various new projects are in development such as an official Stevo autobiography, documentary and new albums. The development of the platform according to Stevo has been in development for over 3 years, led by an internal development team, the project aims to be the biggest and best A&R platform.

The back catalogue for the label is now available to purchase online from somebizzare.com.

== Name ==
The second word of the name is spelt "Bizzare", not "Bizarre". Pearce said: "I like ambiguities. It's Some Bizzare, spelt B I Z Z A R E. The idea of the label was to be aware of people's expectations and do the opposite almost."

== Some Bizzare artists ==
- Agnes Bernelle
- B-Movie
- Bizarre Inc
- Coil
- Dave Ball
- Echo City
- Einstürzende Neubauten
- FM Einheit
- Foetus
- Kontour
- Marc Almond
- Marc and the Mambas
- Pedro INF
- Psychic TV
- Satanicpornocultshop
- Soft Cell
- Swans
- Test Dept
- The Dark Poets
- The The
- Wiseblood

== Footnotes ==
Explanatory notes

== Bibliography ==
- Malins, Steve (1999). Depeche Mode – A Biography. Andre Deutsch Ltd. ISBN 0-233-99425-4.
- Neal, Charles, ed. (1987). Tape Delay: Confessions from the Eighties Underground. SAF Publishing Ltd. ISBN 978-0-946719-02-0 – via Internet Archive.
