= David Ball (electronic musician) =

English producer and musician (1959–2025)

Dave Ball
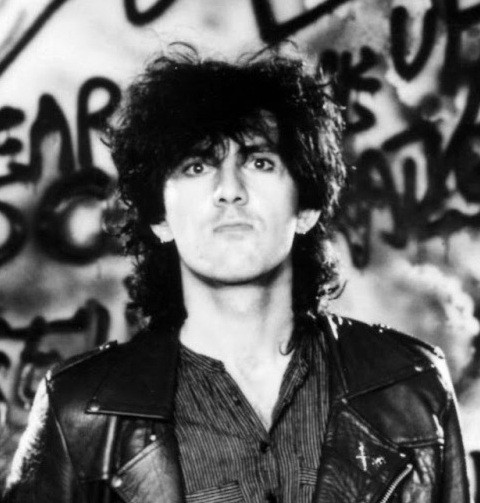
- Ball, c. 1983

Background information
- Born: David James Ball; 3 May 1959; Chester, Cheshire, England
- Origin: Blackpool, Lancashire, England
- Died: 22 October 2025 (aged 66) London, England
- Genres: Synth-pop; new wave
- Instruments: Keyboards · synthesiser · guitar · bass guitar; percussion; vocals
- Years active: 1977–2025
- Label: Some Bizzare
- Formerly of: Soft Cell; The Grid; Nitewreckage; Other People; English Boy on the Loveranch

David James Ball (3 May 1959 – 22 October 2025) was an English producer and electronic musician best known as one half of the synth-pop duo Soft Cell, alongside vocalist Marc Almond. He also co-founded the Grid, and collaborated with artists and producers including Ingo Vauk and Chris Braide. Active from the late 1970s, Ball worked across a range of projects in electronic and experimental music. He is usually credited as Dave Ball on record sleeves.

== Life and career ==
Ball was born on 3 May 1959 in Chester, Cheshire, England; he was later adopted and brought up in Blackpool. He studied at Arnold School before studying art at Leeds Polytechnic, where he met Marc Almond. They formed the synth-pop duo Soft Cell in 1978; the band initially lasted until 1984, but subsequently reunited a few times after long gaps. In 1983, while with Soft Cell, he released a solo album, In Strict Tempo, which featured Gavin Friday, Genesis P-Orridge and Virginia Astley. Later he collaborated with P-Orridge on the soundtrack for the West German film Decoder, which also featured other Some Bizzare artists.

After Soft Cell disbanded, Ball formed a new band, Other People, with Gini Hewes, his wife at the time, (she previously worked with Almond in Marc and the Mambas), and Andy Astle, but they released only one single, "Have a Nice Day". In the late 1980s, he formed another short-lived band, English Boy on the Loveranch, with Nick Sanderson and Jamie Fry, releasing two hi-NRG singles, "The Man in Your Life" and "Sex Vigilante". He also was part of Psychic TV, working on the compilation albums Jack the Tab, Tekno Acid Beat, Towards Thee Infinite Beat and Beyond Thee Infinite Beat , where he met Richard Norris (they recorded the track "Meet Every Situation Head On" together as M.E.S.H.) and with whom he later formed the Grid with singles like "Floatation", "A Beat Called Love" and "Swamp Thing".

Ball reunited with Almond in Soft Cell in 2001, releasing a new album, Cruelty Without Beauty. In 2010, he formed the band Nitewreckage with Celine Hispiche, Rick Mulhall and Terry Neale. Their debut album, Take Your Money and Run, was released on Alaska Sounds on 6 June 2011, with the single "Solarcoaster" preceding it. The album was co-produced and mixed by Martin Rushent. In 2016, Ball and classical pianist Jon Savage collaborated on the experimental electronic album Photosynthesis. In 2018, Soft Cell saw another reunion for a final live show, celebrating the 40th anniversary of the duo being formed. Ball and Almond finished their album Danceteria just before Ball's death in October 2025. It was released on September 25, 2026.

"Quietly brilliant and endlessly innovative, few artists shaped electronic music like Dave Ball. His work with Soft Cell and The Grid proved that synths could be bold and deeply human. A true pioneer, he proved that emotion and experimentation could coexist – and his sound will live on, inspiring generations for years to come."

— Alistair Norbury, President, BMG

Ball also worked as a producer, with Vicious Pink Phenomena (who started as a backing duo for early Soft Cell), the Virgin Prunes and the Rose McDowall side-project Ornamental in the 1980s, and later with Kylie Minogue, Gavin Friday and Anni Hogan. He also remixed for artists and bands such as David Bowie, Vanessa-Mae and Erasure. Many remixes were also made with Norris as the Grid. Ball worked with Friday on a cover of Suicide's "Ghost Rider" for the Alan Vega 70th Birthday Limited Edition EP Series.

After suffering from poor health for several years, Ball died in his sleep at his home on 22 October 2025, at the age of 66.

== Discography ==
- In Strict Tempo (1983), Some Bizzare, Phonogram
- Photosynthesis (with Jon Savage) (2016), Cold Spring
