= Marc Almond discography =

- Studio albums: 27
- Extended plays: 6
- Live albums: 8
- Compilation albums: 13
- Singles: 50
- Video albums: 10

The discography of the English singer, songwriter and recording artist Marc Almond consists of music recorded since the late 1970s. He has recorded as a solo artist and with several other groups, these include Soft Cell, The Loveless, Marc & the Mambas, The Willing Sinners and Flesh Volcano. He has also worked with Michael Cashmore, and has contributed to numerous one-off releases with a variety of artists.

== The Loveless ==
The Loveless - Wild In The Streets (Loveless Records 2021. 10" Vinyl, CD)

The Loveless - Meet The Loveless (Cadiz Music 2023. LP & CD)

The Loveless - Elected (Cadiz Music 2024. 7" Single)

The Loveless - Live At The 100 Club (Loveless Records 2024. LP, CD)

== Solo ==
=== Studio albums ===
| Year | Album information | Chart positions | | | | | | Certifications (sales thresholds) |
| Year | Album information | UK | AUT | GER | NLD | SWI | US | Certifications (sales thresholds) |
|---|---|---|---|---|---|---|---|---|
| 1984 | Vermin in Ermine: Released: October 1984; Labels: Some Bizzare, Vertigo Records | 36 | – | – | – | – | – | |
| 1985 | Stories of Johnny: Released: September 1985; Labels: Some Bizzare, Virgin Records | 22 | – | – | – | – | – | |
| 1987 | Mother Fist and Her Five Daughters: Released: April 1987; Labels: Some Bizzare, Virgin Records | 41 | – | – | – | – | – | |
| 1988 | The Stars We Are: Released: September 1988; Labels: Parlophone, Capitol Records | 41 | 15 | 9 | 26 | 5 | 144 | UK: Silver |
| 1989 | Jacques: Released: December 1989; Labels: Some Bizzare, Rough Trade Records | – | – | – | – | – | – | |
| 1990 | Enchanted: Released: June 1990; Labels: Parlophone, Capitol Records | 52 | – | 73 | 81 | – | – | |
| 1991 | Tenement Symphony: Released: October 1991; Labels: WEA, Sire, Reprise Records | 39 | – | – | – | – | – | |
| 1993 | Absinthe: Released: October 1993; Labels: Some Bizzare, Play It Again Sam | – | – | – | – | – | – | |
| 1996 | Fantastic Star: Released: 19 February 1996; Labels: Some Bizzare, Mercury Records | 54 | – | – | – | – | – | |
| 1999 | Open All Night: Released: August 1999; Labels: Blue Star Music, Instinct Records | - | – | – | – | – | – | |
| 2001 | Stranger Things: Released: 18 June 2001; Labels: Blue Star Music, XIII Bis Records | - | – | – | – | – | – | |
| 2003 | Heart on Snow: Released: November 2003; Labels: XIII BIS Records, Blue Star Music, Psychobaby Records | – | – | – | – | – | – | |
| 2007 | Stardom Road: Released: 4 June 2007; Labels: Sequel Records, Sanctuary Records, BMG Direct Marketing | 53 | – | – | – | – | – | |
| 2009 | Orpheus in Exile (as Marc Almond with Alexei Fedorov): Released: 7 September 2009; Labels: Strike Force Entertainment / Cherry Red | – | – | – | – | – | – | |
| 2010 | Varieté: Released: 7 June 2010; Labels: Strike Force Entertainment, Cherry Red | - | – | – | – | – | – | |
| 2011 | Feasting with Panthers (as Marc Almond/Michael Cashmore): Released: 13 June 2011; Labels: Strike Force Entertainment, Cherry Red | – | – | – | – | – | – | |
| 2014 | The Tyburn Tree (Dark London) (as John Harle & Marc Almond): Released: 24 February 2014; Labels: Sospiro Noir | – (Note: "The Tyburn Tree (Dark London)" did not enter the UK Albums Chart, but peaked at number 20 on the UK Independent Albums Chart, and at number 78 on the UK Physical Albums Chart.) | – | – | – | – | – | |
| 2014 | The Dancing Marquis: Released: 16 June 2014; Labels: Strike Force Entertainment, Cherry Red Records | – | – | – | – | – | – | |
| 2014 | Ten Plagues – A Song Cycle: Released: 7 July 2014; Labels: Strike Force Entertainment, Cherry Red | – (Note: "Ten Plagues – A Song Cycle" did not enter the UK Albums Chart, but peaked at number 30 on the UK Soundtrack Albums Chart.) | – | – | – | – | – | |
| 2015 | The Velvet Trail: Released: 9 March 2015; Labels: Strike Force Entertainment, Cherry Red | 62 | – | – | – | – | – | |
| 2015 | Against Nature: Released: November 2015; Labels: self-released | – | – | – | – | – | – | |
| 2016 | Silver City Ride (as Starcluster & Marc Almond): Released: 19 June 2016; Labels: Closing The Circle | – | – | – | – | – | – | |
| 2017 | Shadows and Reflections: Released: September 2017; Labels: BMG | 14 | – | – | – | – | – | |
| 2018 | How To Destroy Angels (as Coil + Zos Kia + Marc Almond): Released: 3 August 2018; Labels: Cold Spring | – | – | – | – | – | – | |
| 2018 | A Lovely Life to Live (as Jools Holland, Marc Almond with The Rhythm & Blues Orchestra): Released: November 2018; Labels: Rhino | 61 | – | – | – | – | – | |
| 2020 | Chaos and a Dancing Star: Released: 31 January 2020; Labels: BMG | 35 | – | – | – | – | – | |
| 2024 | I'm Not Anyone: Released: 12 July 2024; Labels: BMG | 92 | – | – | – | – | – | |

=== Live albums ===
| Year | Album | Notes |
|---|---|---|
| 1993 | 12 Years of Tears – Live at the Royal Albert Hall: Release date: April 1993; Label: WEA | Selections of his Royal Albert Hall concert in September 1992. Also available on VHS and DVD |
| 1998 | Live in Concert: Release date: November 1998; Label: Some Bizarre | Selections of his first concerts with La Magia (his backing band back then) in London's Astoria Theatre, 13/14 December 1987. La Magia appears wrongly credited as Le Magia. A video of this was released in 1992 |
| 2000 | Live at Liverpool Philharmonic Hall, 1992: Release date: December 2000; Label: Blue Star Music | Official website exclusive release. Live on 12 June 1992 |
| 2001 | Live at the Union Chapel: Release date: December 2001; Label: Blue Star Music | Official website exclusive release. Live on 12 December 2000. Also available on DVD |
| 2003 | The Willing Sinner – Live at the Passion Church, Berlin: Release date: 23 June 2003; Label: Cherry Red | Live on 15 September 1991. Also available on DVD |
| 2008 | In 'Bluegate Fields' – Live at Wilton's Music Hall: Release date: October 2008; Label: Strike Force Entertainment Cherry Red | Recorded at a series of concerts Wilton's Music Hall, London 28 April – 4 May 2008. Comes with a DVD of the show. There's another edition that comes in a DVD box format with exactly the same thing |
| 2009 | Marc in Soho – Live at the London Palladium Soho Jazz Festival 1986: Release date: October 2009; Label: no label | Official website exclusive release. Live on 12 October 1986. This production is an 'official bootleg' and not of high audio quality |
| 2012 | Live in Barcelona at the Apollo 2007 – A Blue Star Official Bootleg: Release date: January 2012; Label: Blue Star Music | Official website exclusive release. Comes with a DVD of the same show. This production is an 'official bootleg' and not of high audio quality |
| 2023 | Chaos And More (Live At The Royal Festival Hall 10th February, '20): Release date: 2023; Label: Strike Force Entertainment | Concert With Chris Braide, previously released as 2 bonus cd's together with 'Things We Lost' EP |

=== Compilation albums ===
- Singles 1984 – 1987 (1987, Some Bizarre Virgin) (compilation of singles from The Willing Sinners era)
- Memorabilia – The Singles (1991, Some Bizarre Mercury) (as Soft Cell and Marc Almond) No. 8 UK
- A Virgin's Tale – Volume I (1992, Some Bizarre Virgin) (1985–1987 B-sides & remixes from The Willing Sinners era)
- A Virgin's Tale – Volume II (1992, Some Bizarre Virgin) (1986–1987 B-sides from the Mother Fist album era)
- Treasure Box (1995, EMI, Some Bizzare) (1988–1990 B-sides, rarities & remixes compilation)
- Flesh Volcano•Slut (1997, Some Bizarre) (as The Flesh Volcano, a side project with the group Foetus, re-issue of the EP with bonus tracks)
- Violent Silence / A Woman's Story (1997, Some Bizarre) (two EPs plus two exclusive compilation tracks)
- Little Rough Rhinestones Volume 1 (2002, Blue Star Music) (Official website release)
- In Session Volume 1 (2003, Some Bizzare BBC/Strange Fruit)
- In Session Volume 2 (2003, Some Bizzare BBC/Strange Fruit)
- Little Rough Rhinestones Volume 2 (2006, Blue Star Music) (Official website release)
- Trials of Eyeliner: Anthology 1979–2016 (2016, UMC)
- Hits & Pieces (2017, UK Chart No.7)

=== Extended plays ===
- A Woman's Story (Some Songs to Take to the Tomb – Compilation One) (1986, Some Bizzare Virgin) (mini album)
- Violent Silence (1986, Some Bizzare) (mini album)
- Slut (1987, Some Bizarre) (as The Flesh Volcano)
- Nijinski Heart EP (2010, Strike Force Entertainment Cherry Red) (download release)
- Tasmanian Tiger EP (2014, Strike Force Entertainment Cherry Red)
- Things We Lost (2022, Cherry Red) (mini album)

=== Singles ===
| Year | Title | Chart positions | | | | | | | | | | Album |
| Year | Title | UK | AUS | AUT | GER | IRL | NLD | NZL | SWE | SWI | US | Album |
|---|---|---|---|---|---|---|---|---|---|---|---|---|
| 1984 | "The Boy Who Came Back" | 52 | – | – | – | – | – | – | – | – | – | Vermin in Ermine |
| 1984 | "You Have" | 57 | – | – | – | – | – | – | – | – | – | Vermin in Ermine |
| 1984 | "Tenderness is a Weakness" | 88 | – | – | – | – | – | – | – | – | – | Vermin in Ermine |
| 1985 | "Stories of Johnny" | 23 | – | – | – | 17 | – | – | – | – | – | Stories of Johnny |
| 1985 | "Love Letter" | 68 | – | – | – | – | – | – | – | – | – | Stories of Johnny |
| 1986 | "The House is Haunted by the Echo of Your Last Goodbye" | 55 | – | – | – | – | – | – | – | – | – | Stories of Johnny |
| 1986 | "A Woman's Story" | 41 | – | – | – | – | – | – | – | – | – | A Woman's Story (Some Songs to Take to the Tomb – Compilation One) |
| 1986 | "Ruby Red" | 47 | – | – | – | – | – | – | – | – | – | Mother Fist and Her Five Daughters |
| 1987 | "Melancholy Rose" | 71 | – | – | – | – | – | – | – | – | – | Mother Fist and Her Five Daughters |
| 1987 | "Mother Fist" | 93 | – | – | – | – | – | – | – | – | – | Mother Fist and Her Five Daughters |
| 1988 | "Tears Run Rings" | 26 | 128 | – | 32 | – | 8 | – | – | – | 67 | The Stars We Are |
| 1988 | "Bitter Sweet" | 40 | – | – | – | – | – | – | – | – | – | The Stars We Are |
| 1989 | "Something's Gotten Hold of My Heart" (featuring Gene Pitney) | 1 | 24 | 2 | 1 | 1 | 5 | 4 | 7 | 1 | – | The Stars We Are |
| 1989 | "Only the Moment" | 45 | – | – | 60 | 26 | – | – | – | – | – | The Stars We Are |
| 1990 | "A Lover Spurned" | 29 | – | – | 61 | – | 46 | – | – | – | – | Enchanted |
| 1990 | "The Desperate Hours" | 45 | – | – | – | – | – | – | – | – | – | Enchanted |
| 1990 | "Waifs and Strays" | 88 | – | – | – | – | – | – | – | – | – | Enchanted |
| 1991 | "Jacky" | 17 | – | – | – | 14 | 57 | – | – | – | – | Tenement Symphony |
| 1992 | "My Hand Over My Heart" | 33 | – | – | 56 | – | – | – | – | – | – | Tenement Symphony |
| 1992 | "The Days of Pearly Spencer" | 4 | 193 | 16 | 21 | 8 | 44 | – | 31 | – | – | Tenement Symphony |
| 1993 | "What Makes a Man" (Live) | 60 | – | – | – | – | – | – | – | – | – | 12 Years of Tears |
| 1995 | "Adored and Explored" | 25 | – | – | – | – | – | – | – | – | – | Fantastic Star |
| 1995 | "The Idol" | 44 | – | – | – | – | – | – | – | – | – | Fantastic Star |
| 1995 | "Child Star" | 41 | – | – | – | – | – | – | – | – | – | Fantastic Star |
| 1996 | "Out There" / "Brilliant Creatures" | 76 | – | – | – | – | – | – | – | – | – | Fantastic Star |
| 1998 | "Black Kiss" | 84 | – | – | – | – | – | – | – | – | – | Open All Night |
| 1999 | "Tragedy (Take a Look and See)" | 144 | – | – | – | – | – | – | – | – | – | Open All Night |
| 1999 | "My Love" / "Threat of Love" (with The Creatures) | – | – | – | – | – | – | – | – | – | – | Open All Night |
| 2001 | "Glorious" | – | – | – | – | – | – | – | – | – | – | Stranger Things |
| 2003 | "Gone But Not Forgotten" | – | – | – | – | – | – | – | – | – | – | Heart on Snow |
| 2007 | "I Close My Eyes and Count to Ten" (with Sarah Cracknell) | – | – | – | – | – | – | – | – | – | – | Stardom Road |
| 2008 | "Gabriel & the Lunatic Lover" (with Michael Cashmore) | – | – | – | – | – | – | – | – | – | – | Feasting with Panthers |
| 2013 | "Burn Bright" / "The Dancing Marquis" | – | – | – | – | – | – | – | – | – | – | The Dancing Marquis |
| 2015 | "Scars" | – | – | – | – | – | – | – | – | – | – | The Velvet Trail |
| 2015 | "Pleasure's Wherever You Are" | – | – | – | – | – | – | – | – | – | – | The Velvet Trail |
| 2015 | "Bad to Me" | – | – | – | – | – | – | – | – | – | – | The Velvet Trail |
| 2015 | "Demon Lover" | – (Note: "Demon Lover" did not enter the UK Singles Chart, but peaked at number 83 on the UK Physical Singles Chart.) | – | – | – | – | – | – | – | – | – | The Velvet Trail |
| 2017 | "A Kind of Love" | – | – | – | – | – | – | – | – | – | – | Hits and Pieces |
| 2017 | "How Can I Be Sure" | – | – | – | – | – | – | – | – | – | – | Shadows and Reflections |
| 2023 | "My Death" (with Mike Garson) | – (Note: "My Death" did not enter the UK Singles Chart, but peaked at number 1 on the UK Vinyl Singles Chart, at number 4 on the UK Physical Singles Chart, and at number 33 on the UK Singles Sales Chart.) | – | – | – | – | – | – | – | – | – | Non-album single |
| 2024 | "Marc Sings The Shangri-Las" | – (Note: "Marc Sings The Shangri-Las" did not enter the UK Singles Chart, but peaked at number 2 on the UK Physical Singles Chart, at number 2 on the UK Vinyl Singles Chart, and at number 27 on the UK Singles Sales Chart.) | – | – | – | – | – | – | – | – | – | Non-album single |
| 2024 | "Elusive Butterfly" | – | – | – | – | – | – | – | – | – | – | I'm Not Anyone |
| 2024 | "The Coldest Night of the Year" (with Neal X) | – (Note: "The Coldest Night of the Year" did not enter the UK Singles Chart, but peaked at number 12 on the UK Vinyl Singles Chart, at number 13 on the UK Physical Singles Chart, and at number 61 on the UK Singles Sales Chart.) | – | – | – | – | – | – | – | – | – | Non-album single |

=== Exclusive / fan club releases ===
| Year | Album | Notes |
|---|---|---|
| 1984 | My Death: Release date: August 1984; Label: Gutter Hearts | Fan-club exclusive release. Different version than the one that appeared on Jacques album. Later released in the official website Brel Extras EP release |
| 1986 | Your Aura: Release date: April 1986; Label: Gutter Hearts | Fan-club exclusive release. Originally by Marc and the Mambas, a Black Heart single b-side. This different version is live from a solo concert in 1985 or 1986 |
| 1992 | Christmas in Vegas: Release date: December 1992; Label: no label | Fan-club exclusive release. Different version than the one that was later released in the "Child Star" CD-single |
| 1995 | When I Was A Young Man: Release date: December 1995; Label: no label | Fan-club exclusive release. Live at Liverpool Philharmonic 12 June 1992. Later released in the Liverpool Philharmonic, 1992 official website release |
| 1996 | Marie Et Marc: Release date: January 1996; Label: Freedom | Fan-club exclusive release. Collaboration EP with Marie France. It includes two self-penned tracks from Marc, sung by Marie, The Flame and Sheherazade. And two duets, A Quoi Ca Sert L'Amour and Autumn Leaves. The Flame has been performed live by Marc since 1992, a Marc version of Sheherazade was released in 2004 in a 7" available through his official site and then in his Almeida Theatre shows |
| 2004 | Sheherezade: Release date: 20 July 2004; Label: Blue Star Music | Official website exclusive release. Released in a dark pink 7" vinyl available through his official site and then in his Almeida Theatre shows. Limited to 500 copies |
| 2005 | Delirious / Theatre of Dreams: Release date: May 2005; Label: Blue Star Music | Official website exclusive release. Released in a blue 7" vinyl, 500 limited, and later in a CD5" with an extra track. Delirious and Theatre of Dreams were produced by Mekon and were intended as b-sides for the unreleased Come Out EP (taken from Stranger Things), supposed to be out in February 2002. |
| 2008 | Brel Extras: Release date: September 2008; Label: Sin Songs | Official website exclusive release. Jacques Brel covers, it includes live cuts, a new version, a reissue and two new covers, The Desperate Ones and Amsterdam |
| 2009 | Marc Mix: Release date: October 2009; Label: Sin Songs | Official website exclusive release. • A one-hour Marc mix of underground dance & electro tracks including excerpts from Loverush UK, Replicant, Punx Soundcheck, T-Total, Mekon, System F, Starcluster, King Roc & MAD Drivers |
| 2010 | Soho Songs for Piccadilly Bongo: Release date: August 2010; Publisher: Enitharmon Press | Seven song CD only available with Piccadilly Bongo, a collection of poetry by Jeremy Reed. The songs are Eros & Eye, Fun City, Brewer Street Blues, Seedy Films, Sleaze, Twilights and Lowlifes & Soho So Long. All songs are newly recorded for the CD and feature Neal X on guitar, loops and harmonica. |
| 2015 | Dead Eyed Child / Black Satin: Release date: June 2015; Publisher: First Third Books | 7" only available with the deluxe edition of "Marc Almond", a photobiography book. Limited to 1000 copies. |

== Guest appearances and contributions (singles and EPs) ==
| Year | Title | Artist | Chart positions | | | | |
| Year | Title | Artist | UK | GER | IRL | NLD | SWI |
|---|---|---|---|---|---|---|---|
| 1985 | "I Feel Love (Medley)" | Bronski Beat and Marc Almond | 3 | 16 | 3 | 11 | 23 |
| 1987 | "This House Is a House of Trouble" | Sally Timms and The Drifting Cowgirls feat. Marc Almond | – | – | – | – | – |
| 1996 | "Yesterday Has Gone" | P.J. Proby & Marc Almond featuring The My Life Story Orchestra | 58 | – | – | – | – |
| 2000 | "Please Stay" | Mekon featuring Marc Almond | 91 | – | – | – | – |
| 2001 | "Total Eclipse" | Rosenstolz + Marc Almond | – | 22 | – | – | – |
| 2001 | "Soul on Soul" | System F featuring Marc Almond | – | – | – | – | – |
| 2004 | Fuck The DJ EP | Punx Soundcheck featuring Marc Almond | – | – | – | – | – |
| 2004 | Face Control EP | Replicant featuring Marc Almond | – | – | – | – | – |
| 2005 | "Delirious" (limited edition) | Mekon featuring Marc Almond | – | – | – | – | – |
| 2005 | "Perfect Honey" (limited dance release) | Loverush UK! featuring Marc Almond | 154 | – | – | – | – |
| 2005 | "Prime Evil" (limited dance release) | King Roc featuring Marc Almond | – (Note: "Prime Evil" did not enter the UK Singles Chart, but peaked at number 13 on the UK Dance Singles Chart.) | – | – | – | – |
| 2005 | "Baby's on Fire" / "Take Me Away" (limited dance release) | T–Total featuring Marc Almond | – (Note: "Baby's On Fire" / "Take Me Away" did not enter the UK Singles Chart, but peaked at number 48 on the UK Independent Singles Chart.) | – | – | – | – |
| 2005 | Berlin Moon EP | Punx Soundcheck featuring Marc Almond | – | – | – | – | – |
| 2008 | "Smoke & Mirrors" | Starcluster featuring Marc Almond | – | – | – | – | – |

== Guest appearances and contributions (album tracks) ==
| Year | Title | Artist | Credits |
|---|---|---|---|
| 1982 | Force the Hand of Chance | Psychic TV | Lead vocals on "Guiltless" and backing vocals on "Stolen Kisses" |
| 1983 | The Whip | Various artists | Duet on "The Hungry Years" with Andi of Sex Gang Children. Written by both. He also played the drum machine and piano. Mixed by both and Flood |
| 1985 | Kickabye | Anni Hogan | Lead vocals on "Burning Boats". Marc Almond is credited as Raoul Revére. Released later as a b-side for "The House Is Haunted" single by Marc Almond, 1985 |
| 1985 | If You Can't Please Yourself You Can't, Please Your Soul | Various artists | Lead vocals on "Love Amongst The Ruined". Later released in the Flesh Volcano•Slut compilation, 1997 |
| 1985 | Skin | The Burmoe Brothers | Lead vocals on "Skin" |
| 1985 | Devastate to Liberate | Various artists | Guitar on "Restless Day". Marc Almond is credited as Raoul Revére. A track by Coil, later released in the Scatology album reissued first in 1988, and subsequent reissues |
| 1986 | MM Vinyl Conflict 1 | Various artists | Lead vocals on "Oily Black Limousine". Later released in the Violent Silence / A Woman's Story compilation, 1997 |
| 1986 | Fruitcakes & Furry Collars | Various artists | Lead vocals on "Indigo Blue". Later released in the Violent Silence / A Woman's Story compilation, 1997 |
| 1986 | Horse Rotorvator | Coil | Backing vocals on "Who by Fire" (Leonard Cohen cover) and "Slur". Marc Almond is credited as Raoul Revére |
| 1988 | 'Til Things Are Brighter...A Tribute to Johnny Cash | Various artists | Lead vocals on "Man in Black" |
| 1988 | Provoke N° 3 | Various artists | Reading two self penned poems, "The Angel of Death in the Adonis Lounge" and "Pushin' Ink (For Spring)" both featured in his first poems book The Angel of Death in the Adonis Lounge, 1988 |
| 1991 | Love's Secret Domain | Coil | Lead vocals on "Titan Arch" |
| 1992 | The Law of the Dream | Melinda Miel | Backing vocals on "Shivers in Red". "Rouge and Perfume" was written by Marc Almond |
| 1992 | Ruby Trax | Various artists | Lead vocals on "Like a Prayer" (Madonna cover) |
| 1997 | Legend | P.J. Proby | Duet on "Yesterday Has Gone" and on "Child of Clay". Marc produced this and also wrote "I'm Coming Back", "Devil in Red Velvet" and "Suburban Opera", the last one was later released in a demo form in the official website compilation Little Rough Rhinestones Volume 1 |
| 1998 | Philharmania – Vol. 1 | Mike Batt & The Royal Philharmonic Orchestra | Lead vocals on "Paint It Black" (Rolling Stones cover) |
| 1998 | Mojo – Original Soundtrack | Various artists | Lead vocals on "Sequins and Stars" and "One Night of Sin" (Elvis Presley cover). "Sequins and Stars" was later released in the Marc Almond album Open All Night reissue, 2010 |
| 1999 | Hommage to À Polnareff | Various artists | Lead vocals on "Ame Câline". Sangin French. Later released in the Marc Almond album Stranger Things reissue, 2010 |
| 2000 | Relax with Mekon | Mekon | Lead vocals on "Out of My Soul" and "Please Stay". Featured vocals on "Out of My Soul (Reprise)" |
| 2000 | Hyacinths and Thistles | The 6ths | Lead vocals on "Volcana!" |
| 2000 | Eurorock Sonic Seducer Festival 2000 | Various artists | Lead vocals on "Erotic Shopping". The song belong to an unreleased soundtrack album for Rhythm & Blues, a British comedy. Later released in the Marc Almond official website exclusive compilation Little Rough Rhinestones – Volume 1, 2002 |
| 2001 | Electro-Fiction – Les Belles Promesses électroniques | Various artists | Lead vocals on "Hell". The song belong to an unreleased soundtrack album for Rhythm & Blues, a British comedy. Later released with a different name "Tale of a Tart (Hell)", on the Marc Almond album Open All Night reissue, 2010 |
| 2001 | Small World, Big Band | Jools Holland & His Rhythm & Blues Orchestra | Lead vocals on "Say Hello, Wave Goodbye" (cover of own song) |
| 2002 | A Tribute to Johnny Thunders: I Only Wrote This Song for You | Various artists | Lead vocals on "Hurt" |
| 2002 | Songs | Betjeman & Read | Lead vocals on "Narcissus". The song featured in a 1998 withdrawn album by them called Words and Music, that exists as a promo. Not the same song recorded by Marc and the Mambas on Torment and Toreros |
| 2003 | Happy in the City of Fools | Pyx Lax | Lead vocals on "All My Angels Falling" |
| 2006 | Monsieur Gainsbourg Revisited | Various artists | Lead vocals on "Boy Toy (I'm the Boy)". Tribute to Serge Gainsbourg. Collaboration with Trash Palace. Later released in the Marc Almond album Stranger Things reissue, 2010 |
| 2006 | Not Alone | Various artists | Lead vocals on "Our Love My Love" (Charles Aznavour cover). Later released in the Marc Almond album Stranger Things reissue, 2010 |
| 2006 | Moving Out to the Country | Jools Holland & His Rhythm & Blues Orchestra | Lead vocals on "Games People Play" (Joe South cover) |
| 2006 | Black Ships Ate the Sky | Current 93 | Lead vocals on "Idumea". There's a different version released on Current 93's Black Ships Eat the Sky |
| 2006 | 01 | So | Duet on "Way You Walk". There's a different version included on the EP called "Way You Walk (Alone with Him Remix)" |
| 2008 | Black & Gold | Punx Soundcheck | Lead vocals on "Exibitionist", "Saint Now" and backing vocals on "Flowerpower". A different version of "Exibitionist" was later released on Marc's album Varieté, 2010 |
| 2008 | Starcluster EP | Starcluster | Lead vocals on "Smoke & Mirrors" |
| 2008 | Digital Angel | OTHON | Lead vocals on "The Epitaph of God", "Tonight" and "Tango Song" (lyrics by Aleister Crowley) |
| 2009 | Mr & Mrs Smith in Bed with... Volume One | Various artists | Lead vocals on "That Dress (Keen K Remix)", although this is credited as a remix there's no original version released anywhere. Soundtrack to the movie Mr. & Mrs. Smith |
| 2010 | The Madcap Laughs Again! | Various artists | Lead vocals on "Late Night", a tribute to Syd Barrett |
| 2010 | Peace | Various artists | Lead vocals on "Dead Eyed Child". Downloadable compilation, bit rate quality of 320 kbit/s |
| 2011 | Impermanence | OTHON | Lead vocals on "Impermanence +" and "Last Night I Paid to Close My Eyes" |
| 2012 | Desertshore/The Final Report | X-TG | Lead vocals on "The Falconer". Featured vocals on "Desertshores". Desertshore is complete cover of a Nico album. X-TG are Throbbing Gristle without Genesis P-Orridge |
| 2013 | Son of Rogues Gallery: Pirate Ballads, Sea Songs & Chanteys | Various artists | Lead vocals on "Ship in Distress" |
| 2013 | Art Music | John Harle | Lead vocals on "In the Wood", "Angel Eyes" and features vocals on "The Arrival of Spring", all songs are poems by William Blake |
| 2014 | Pineal | OTHON | Lead vocals on "Cobra Coral". Sung in Portuguese |
| 2015 | Windowpane | Coil | Lead vocals on "The Dark Age of Love". Originally available as an MP3 (128kbs) download through Coil's website at Brainwashed.com in 1999, part of a collection of songs called Songs of the Week. "The Dark Age of Love" was one of the working titles for Coil's Love's Secret Domain album |
| 2015 | Born to Rock'n'Roll | The Montecristos | Lead vocals on "Brand New Cadillac" |
| 2015 | The Man Who Sold the World Live in London | Holy Holy | Lead vocals on "After All". Duet with Glenn Gregory on "Watch That Man". Live tribute to David Bowie at O2 Shepherds's Bush Empire – London, 22 September 2014 |
| 2016 | Hannibal Season 3 – Volume 1 (Original Television Soundtrack) | Brian Reitzell | Lead vocals on "Snake Charmer" |
| 2016 | Fly (Songs Inspired by the Film Eddie the Eagle) | Gary Barlow & Various Artists | Lead vocals on "Out of the Sky" |
| 2017 | Skyscraper Souls | Downes Braide Association | Vocals on "Skin Deep" |
| 2023 | Echoes: Ancient & Modern | Trevor Horn | Vocals on "Love Is A Battlefield" |

== Videos ==
=== Video albums ===
| Year | Album | Notes |
|---|---|---|
| 1987 | Videos 1984 – 1987: Release date: November 1987; Label: Virgin | Video compilation of his first 10 solo singles, from "The Boy Who Came Back" until "Mother Fist" |
| 1991 | Memorabilia – The Video Singles: Release date: August 1991; Label: 4 Front Video | Video compilation of some Soft Cell videos including two 1991 versions plus some solo videos |
| 1992 | Live in Concert: Release date: 1992; Label: Winsong | A selection of the two Astoria concerts in 13/14 December 1987. This was reissued on DVD in 2002, under the name of A Lover Spurned – Live at the Astoria London and with a different front cover |
| 1993 | 12 Years of Tears – Live at the Royal Albert Hall: Release date: April 1993; Label: WEA | Live on 30 September 1992. This was reissued on DVD in 2007 |
| 2002 | The Willing Sinner: Release date: June 2002; Label: Cherry Red | Live at the Passionkirche in Berlin, 15 September 1991 |
| 2003 | Live at the Union Chapel: Release date: 17 November 2003; Label: Cherry Red | Live in London, 12 December 2000 |
| 2004 | Live at the Lokerse Feesten 2000: Release date: November 2004; Label: SPV | Live in a Belgium festival, on 7 August 2000. This edition is unauthorized by Marc Almond. The authorized edition was released in 2005 with extras |
| 2005 | Sin Songs, Torch and Romance – Live at the Almeida Theatre 2004: Release date: January 2005; Label: Demon Vision | Live in London, 22 July 2004 |
| 2008 | In 'Bluegate Fields' – Live at Wilton's Music Hall: Release date: October 2008; Label: Strike Force Entertainment, Cherry Red | Recorded at a series of concerts Wilton's Music Hall, London 28 April – 4 May 2008. Comes with a CD of the show. There's another edition that comes in a CD box format with exactly the same thing |

=== Music videos ===
| Year | Title | Director |
|---|---|---|
| 1984 | "The Boy Who Came Back" | Tim Pope |
| 1984 | "You Have" | Tim Pope |
| 1984 | "Tenderness is a Weakness" | Derek Jarman |
| 1985 | "Stories of Johnny" | Peter Christopherson |
| 1985 | "Love Letter" | Peter Christopherson |
| 1986 | "The House is Haunted by the Echo of Your Last Goodbye" | Peter Christopherson |
| 1986 | "A Woman's Story" | Peter Christopherson |
| 1986 | "Ruby Red" | Peter Christopherson |
| 1987 | "Melancholy Rose" | Peter Christopherson |
| 1987 | "Mother Fist" | Peter Christopherson |
| 1988 | "Tears Run Rings" | Tim Broad |
| 1988 | "Tears Run Rings" (US version) | Peter Christopherson |
| 1988 | "Bitter Sweet" | Tim Pope |
| 1989 | "The Stars We Are" | |
| 1989 | "Something's Gotten Hold of My Heart" | |
| 1989 | "Only the Moment" | |
| 1990 | "A Lover Spurned" | Pierre et Gilles |
| 1990 | "The Desperate Hours" | John Maybury |
| 1990 | "Waifs and Strays" | John Maybury |
| 1991 | "Jacky" | Philippe Gaultier |
| 1992 | "My Hand Over My Heart" | Philippe Gaultier |
| 1992 | "The Days of Pearly Spencer" | |
| 1995 | "Adored and Explored" | Zana |
| 1995 | "The Idol" | |
| 1995 | "Child Star" | Zana |
| 1996 | "Out There" | |
| 1999 | "Tragedy (Take a Look and See)" | |
| 1999 | "My Love" | |
| 2001 | "Glorious" | |
| 2003 | "So Long the Path" | |
| 2003 | "The Storks" | |
| 2009 | "Friendship" | Jamie McLeod |
| 2009 | "I Love So Much to Look into Your Eyes" | Jamie McLeod |
| 2010 | "Variety" | |
| 2010 | "The Exhibitionist" | Jamie McLeod, Marc Almond |
| 2010 | "Lavender" | |
| 2012 | "Lonely Go Go Dancer" | Jamie McLeod |
| 2012 | "Please Stay" | Jamie McLeod |
| 2013 | "Be Still" | Jamie McLeod |
| 2013 | "Burn Bright" | Jamie McLeod |
| 2013 | "The Dancing Marquis" | Jamie McLeod |
| 2014 | "Worship Me Now" | Jamie McLeod |
| 2015 | "Scar" | |
| 2015 | "The Pain of Never" | |
| 2015 | "Life in My Own Way" | |
| 2015 | "The Velvet Trail" | |
| 2017 | "A Kind of Love" | Tim Pope |
| 2017 | "How Can I Be Sure" | |
| 2017 | "Embers" | |
| 2019 | "Lord of Misrule" | |
| 2019 | "Hollywood Forever" | Charlie Max |
| 2020 | "Slow Burn Love" | |
| 2020 | "Chaos" | |
| 2021 | "Black Raven (Chiorny Voron)" | Jamie McLeod, Gerry McNee |
| 2022 | "Dancer" | Jamie McLeod |

=== Film / soundtrack appearances ===
| Year | Title | Artist | Credits |
|---|---|---|---|
| 2005 | Rhythm & Blues | Stephen Lennhoff | Film released on DVD. Soundtrack by Marc Almond. Lead vocals on "Rhythm & Blues", "Thrill of the Kill", "Hell", "Porn Star" and "Erotic Shopping". It includes an audio section with "Rhythm & Blues" and "Thrill of the Kill". All tracks were released somewhere but "Thrill of the Kill" which remains exclusive to this release. |
| 2007 | Marc Bolan – The Celebration Concert | Various artists | Tribute released on DVD. All tracks are originally by Marc Bolan / T-Rex. Lead vocals on "Brokenhearted Blues", "The Visit", "The Perfumed Garden of Gulliver Smith", "Change", "Life's a Gas", "Dandy in the Underworld" and "Teenage Dream". Duets with Gloria Jones on "Tainted Love". All tracks are exclusive to this release. |

== Books ==
- 1988 The Angel of Death in the Adonis Lounge (poems)
- 1999 Beautiful Twisted Night (poems, lyrics and prose)
- 1999 Tainted Life (autobiography, reprinted in paperback in 2000)
- 2001 The End of New York (poems and prose, including spoken word CD)
- 2004 In Search of the Pleasure Palace – Disreputable Travels (autobiography)
