= Vermin in Ermine =

- Cover photography by Peter Ashworth

Studio album by Marc Almond and The Willing Sinners
- Released: October 1984
- Recorded: 1984
- Studio: Hartmann Digital Studios, Bavaria
- Genre: Art pop
- Length: 47:28 (LP); 75:18 (CD and Cassette)
- Label: Some Bizzare, Phonogram, Vertigo
- Producer: Mike Hedges

Marc Almond and The Willing Sinners chronology
Torment and Toreros (with Marc and the Mambas) (1983)	Vermin in Ermine (1984)	Stories of Johnny (1985)

Singles from Vermin in Ermine
- 1. "The Boy Who Came Back" b/w "Joey Demento" Released: June 1984; 2. "You Have" b/w "Split Lip (Single Version)" Released: September 1984; 3. "Tenderness is a Weakness" b/w "Love For Sale" Released: November 1984

Vermin in Ermine is the début solo studio album by the British singer/songwriter Marc Almond. It was released in October 1984 and reached number 36 on the UK Albums Chart. Vermin in Ermine includes the singles "The Boy Who Came Back", "You Have" and "Tenderness is a Weakness".

Almond with his new assembled band The Willing Sinners - an evolution from his previous outfit Marc and the Mambas - featuring Annie Hogan, Billy McGee, Martin McCarrick, Richard Riley and Steven Humphreys, accompanied by studio musicians recorded the songs for album at Hartmann Digital Studios, Bavaria. The artwork was designed by Huw Feather from a concept by Almond with photography by Peter Ashworth.

Professional ratings
Review scores
Source	Rating
AllMusic	3.5/5 stars
Smash Hits	9.5/10 stars
Encyclopedia of Popular Music	2/5 stars

== Track listing ==
=== LP ===
All tracks are written by Marc Almond

Side one
No.	Title	Length
1.	"Shining Sinners"	6:38
2.	"Hell Was a City"	4:02
3.	"You Have"	5:38
4.	"Crime Sublime"	3:12
5.	"Gutter Hearts"	4:25

Side two
No.	Title	Length
6.	"Ugly Head"	7:56
7.	"The Boy Who Came Back"	4:53
8.	"Solo Adultos"	5:37
9.	"Tenderness is a Weakness"	5:07

=== CD and Cassette ===
All tracks are written by Marc Almond

No.	Title	Length
1.	"Shining Sinners"	6:38
2.	"Hell Was a City"	4:02
3.	"You Have"	5:38
4.	"Split Lip"	17:13
5.	"Crime Sublime"	3:12
6.	"Gutter Hearts"	4:25
7.	"Ugly Head"	7:56
8.	"The Boy Who Came Back"	4:53
9.	"Solo Adultos"	5:37
10.	"Joey Demento"	5:48
11.	"Pink Shack Blues"	4:49
12.	"Tenderness is a Weakness"	5:07

== Personnel ==
- Marc Almond – vocals, all arrangements, design concept

The Willing Sinners

- Annie Hogan – piano, vibes
- Billy McGee – bass (bowed and plucked)
- Martin McCarrick – cello, keyboards
- Richard Riley – guitar
- Steven Humphreys – drums

with:

- Gary Barnacle – saxophone
- Enrico Tomasso – trumpet, flugelhorn; trumpet arrangement on "Hell Was a City"
- Gini Ball – violin
- Zeke Manyika – drums on "Pink Shack Blues" and "Ugly Head"
- Martin Ditcham – percussion, tympani on "Tenderness is a Weakness"
- Spiros – bouzouki on "Shining Sinners"
- Nancy Peppers – backing vocals on "The Boy Who Came Back" and "Pink Shack Blues"

Technical

- Mike Hedges – producer
- Tom Thiel – engineer
- Flood – engineer on "Shining Sinners" and "Crime Sublime"
- Billy McGee, Gini Ball, Martin Ditcham – string arrangements
- Peter Ashworth – cover photography
- Huw Feather – design
- Rizz – glamour wear
