= Steve James Sherlock =

British composer and musician

- Born: 1953 (age 72–73); London, United Kingdom
- Instruments: saxophone, clarinet, flute

Steve James Sherlock (born 1953) is a British composer, musician, and saxophonist best known for his work with the English post-punk band The The, and the British new wave band Marc and the Mambas. He began his career as a founding member of the British experimental band Neu Electrikk.

== Career summary ==
Sherlock grew up in Thornton Heath, South London, and played the saxophone, clarinet and flute. On hearing musicians like Andy Mackay of the 1970s band Roxy Music and Davey Payne, Ian Dury and the Blockheads Sherlock developed his own method of playing. This invariably involved experimenting with sound and processing the playing through various effects pedals.

He met vocalist Derek Morris in 1977 and together they formed the band Electra Vogue. Steve Parry later joined Sherlock and Morris having answered an advert placed by Morris in the NME for experimental musicians that listen to the Velvet Underground and David Bowie. This trio of musicians formed the nucleus of what was later to become Neu Electrikk.

=== Neu Electrikk ===
Neu Electrikk comprised singer/songwriter Derek Morris, guitarist and keyboardist Steve Parry, bassist Nick Hunt, saxophonist Steve Sherlock, and drummer Barry Deller. Neu Electrikk were based in London and part of the experimental, post punk music scene that included artists like This Heat, The The, Wire and Throbbing Gristle. Live concerts were erratic events, whereby three-minute songs became long passages of improvisation and noise. Neu Electrikk would often take to the stage to the voice of Frank Sinatra being accompanied by pre-recorded tapes of bird song and the sound of an industrial hammer.

=== The The ===
Sherlock became involved with Matt Johnson after being introduced by Steve Parry. Following Keith Laws's departure, The The comprised Johnson alongside Simon Turner (guitar, vocals), Colin Lloyd Tucker (guitar, vocals), and Sherlock (saxophone).

In 1982 he contributed flute and saxophone parts to the songs "Three Orange Kisses from Kazan" and "Waitin' for the Upturn". Both tracks were intended as singles from The The's debut album, The Pornography of Despair, which was never officially released. They later appeared on the B-side of the 12-inch single "Uncertain Smile" and were included on the cassette release of Soul Mining. Johnson composed most of the melody lines on his original demo, with Sherlock's contributions included. He later re-recorded the track in New York City with session musician Crispin Cioe on saxophone and flute.

Sherlock played with The The during the bands month-long residency at the Marquee Club in London in 1982.

=== Marc Almond ===
Marc and the Mambas was a British new wave band, formed by Marc Almond in 1982 as a side project to his synth-pop band Soft Cell. The band comprised Marc Almond, Steve James Sherlock, and Annie Hogan.

His inventive playing featured prominently on Torment and Toreros. Sherlock notably sharing writing credits with Almond for the track "Narcissus" for the album. Marc and the Mambas could be considered the blueprint for Marc Almond's solo career.Torment and Toreros being an eclectic blend of Vaudeville, French chanson, goth sensibility, guitar noise, saxophones/flutes, piano and string sections. Marc Almond became mentally ill during the course of making the album and later ironically described the composition of the album as "a nervous breakdown put to music." The album peaked at No. 28 on the UK Albums Chart in August 1983. Shortly after completing the album, Almond disbanded the band.

Antony Hegarty of Antony and the Johnsons has referred to Marc and the Mambas being his favourite band all through his teens, becoming the starting point for Antony and the Johnsons and the album Torment and Toreros being probably the definitive record of his adolescence. Steve James Sherlock featured on Marc and the Mambas' limited edition DVD release of Three Black Nights of Little Black Bites: Live at the Duke of York's Theatre (1983). The live performance that was used for the DVD was filmed by Peter "Sleazy" Christopherson of the avant-garde, visual art band Throbbing Gristle.

== Other recordings ==
Sherlock worked on various sessions with Keith Laws The The (unreleased). Recorded with Matt Johnson/Colin Lloyd Tucker/ Simon Fisher Turner contributing to the Deux Filles – 'Silence and Wisdom' LP. Sherlock performed flute on the song "The Hungry Years" from the 1983 compilation album The Whip by Marc Almond and Andi Sex Gang. Sherlock recorded with post-punk band Red Army Choir on their 1981 EP Schizophrenic, released via Red Rhino Records.

== Selected discography ==
- Cover Girl – Neu Electrikk (1979)
- Lust of Berlin – Neu Electrikk (1978)
- Soul Mining (cassette and later extra tracks CD version) – The The (1983)
- Torment and Toreros – Marc and the Mambas (1983)
- Uncertain Smile – (12" Single b-side) – The The (1982)
- Silence and Wisdom – Deux Filles (1982)
- Red1B3 – Red Army Choir (1982)
- Three Black Nights of Little Black Bites – Marc and the Mambas (1983)
- Silence & Wisdom & Double Happiness – Deux Filles (1982,1983,2013) Double CD Package LTM Records
