= Mother Fist and Her Five Daughters =

Studio album by Marc Almond and The Willing Sinners
- Released: 6 April 1987
- Recorded: Summer 1986
- Studio: Milo Studios, London, Abbey Road, London
- Genre: Art pop
- Length: 50:02
- Label: Some Bizzare, Virgin
- Producer: Mike Hedges, Marc Almond

Marc Almond and The Willing Sinners chronology
Stories of Johnny (1985)	Mother Fist and Her Five Daughters (1987)	The Stars We Are (1988)

Singles from Mother Fist and Her Five Daughters
- 1. "Ruby Red" Released: October 1986; 2. "Melancholy Rose" Released: 2 February 1987; 3. "Mother Fist" Released: 23 March 1987

Mother Fist and Her Five Daughters (often shortened to Mother Fist) is the third studio album by the British singer/songwriter Marc Almond. It was released in April 1987 and reached number 41 on the UK Albums Chart. Mother Fist and Her Five Daughters includes the singles "Ruby Red", "Melancholy Rose", and "Mother Fist". The album title is taken from Nocturnal Turnings or How Siamese Twins Have Sex, a short story by the American author Truman Capote. Almond dedicates the album in the liner notes to Capote.

Almond with his assembled band The Willing Sinners, made up of Annie Hogan, Billy McGee, Martin McCarrick, Richard Riley and Steven Humphreys, accompanied by studio musicians recorded the songs for the album at Milo Studios, London and Abbey Road. The artwork was designed by Huw Feather with photography by Ben Thornberry.

Professional ratings
Review scores
Source	Rating
Allmusic	4.5/5 stars
Encyclopedia of Popular Music	2/5 stars

== Track listing ==
All tracks are written by Marc Almond; except where indicated.

Side one
No.	Title	Writer(s)	Length
1.	"Mother Fist"		4:29
2.	"There is a Bed"		4:50
3.	"Saint Judy"		5:53
4.	"The Room Below"	Almond, Annie Hogan	3:30
5.	"Angel in Her Kiss"	Almond, Hogan	3:42
6.	"The Hustler"	Almond, Hogan	3:15

Side two
No.	Title	Writer(s)	Length
7.	"Melancholy Rose"		3:10
8.	"Mr Sad"		3:49
9.	"The Sea Says"	Almond, Hogan	4:03
10.	"Champ"	Almond, Hogan	4:23
11.	"Ruby Red"		3:41
12.	"The River"		5:17

== Personnel ==
- Marc Almond – vocals, arrangements

The Willing Sinners

- Annie Hogan – piano, marimba, pump organ
- Billy McGee – double bass, electric bass guitar
- Martin McCarrick – cello, accordion, yang t'chin, keyboards
- Richard Riley – acoustic guitar, electric guitar
- Steven Humphreys – drums, assorted percussion

with:

- Nigel Eaton – hurdy-gurdy
- Peter Thoms – trombone
- Enrico Tomasso – trumpet
- Jane West – backing vocals
- Audrey Riley – backing vocals

Technical

- Mike Hedges – Vocals, Producer, Engineering (Abbey Road)
- Annie Hogan – Arrangements
- Martin McCarrick – Cello Arrangements
- Charles Gray – Engineering (Milo)
- Haydn Bendall – Engineering (Abbey Road)
- Ian Grimble – Engineering (Abbey Road)
- Huw Feather – Design, Layout
- Ben Thornberry – Photography
