= Absinthe (Marc Almond album) =

Studio album by Marc Almond
- Released: October 1993
- Recorded: 1986 and 1990
- Studios: Milo Studios, London
- Genre: Art pop
- Length: 43:49
- Label: Some Bizzare
- Producers: Charles Gray, Marc Almond, Martin Watkins

Marc Almond chronology
Tenement Symphony (1991)	Absinthe (1993)	Fantastic Star (1995)

Absinthe, also known as Absinthe – The French Album, is the eighth studio album by the British singer/songwriter Marc Almond. It was released by Some Bizzare in October 1993.

== Background ==
According to the writer and poet Jeremy Reed in his biography of Almond, The Last Star, "Almond largely at his own expense worked on the songs between 1986 and 1989 at Milo Studios".

The album is considered the companion piece to Jacques and in a similar vein contains cover versions of French songs that have been had their lyrics translated into English by Paul Buck. The album contains liner notes by Buck explaining the origins of the songs and the reasons for their inclusion.

== Critical reception ==
Professional ratings
Review scores
Source	Rating
AllMusic	3/5 stars
Encyclopedia of Popular Music	4/5 stars
NME	7/10

Absinthe received generally favourable reviews from critics. Ned Raggett states in his AllMusic review that Absinthe is "In the end, more of a curiosity than Jacques, but an enjoyable one."

== Track listing ==
No.	Title	Writer(s)	Original artist	Length
1.	"Undress Me (Déshabillez-moi)"	Robert Nyel, Gaby Velor, Paul Buck	Juliette Gréco	3:30
2.	"Abel And Cain (Abel et Cain)"	Charles Baudelaire, Léo Ferré, Buck	Charles Baudelaire (from a poem)	2:29
3.	"Lost Paradise (Le Paradis perdu)"	Nyel, Georges Garvarentz, Buck	Lucienne Delyle	3:25
4.	"Secret Child (L'Enfant secret)"	Juliette Gréco, Gérard Jouannest, Buck	Juliette Gréco	5:16
5.	"Rue des Blancs-Manteaux"	Jean-Paul Sartre, Joseph Kosma, Buck	Juliette Gréco	1:29
6.	"The Slave (L'Esclave)"	Serge Lama, Yves Gilbert	Serge Lama	3:34
7.	"Remorse Of The Dead (Remords posthume)"	Baudelaire, Ferré, Buck	Charles Baudelaire (from a poem)	1:55
8.	"Incestuous Love (Amours incestueuses)"	Monique Andrée Serf, Buck	Barbara	6:17
9.	"A Man (Un homme)"	Nyel, Garvarentz, Buck	Robert Nyel	2:33
10.	"My Little Lovers (Mes petites amoureuses)"	Arthur Rimbaud, Billy McGee, Buck	Arthur Rimbaud (From a poem)	7:10
11.	"In Your Bed (Dans ton lit)"	Guy Bontempelli	Juliette Gréco	2:55
12.	"Yesterday When I Was Young (Hier encore)"	Charles Aznavour, Herbert Ketzmer	Charles Aznavour	3:16

== Personnel ==
- Martin Watkins – Piano
- Annie Hogan – Piano
- Martin McCarrick – Cello, Accordion and Piano
- Steven Humphreys – Drums and Percussion
- Audrey Riley – Cello
- Bill McGee – Double Bass
- Enrico Tomasso – Trumpet
- Nigel Thomas – Trombone
- John de Aquiar – Guitar and programming
- Charles Gray – Guitar
- Jacquezs Quezin – Violin
- Gini Ball – Violin
- Hirt Aust – Drums
- Michel Grunberger – Brass
- Joel Mahaut – Brass
- Guy Carpentier – Accordion
- Charles Gray – Production
- Martin Watkins – Mixing
- Paul Buck – all translations
- Marc Almond – Production and arrangements
- Barnard Natier – Engineering
