= Untitled (Marc and the Mambas album) =

Studio album by Marc and the Mambas
- Released: September 1982
- Recorded: May–July 1982
- Studios: Trident Studios, London
- Genres: Alternative rock, new wave
- Length: 60:35
- Label: Some Bizzare
- Producers: Marc and the Mambas

Marc and the Mambas chronology
Untitled (1982)	Torment and Toreros (1983)

Untitled is the first studio album by the British singer/songwriter Marc Almond's band Marc and the Mambas. It was released by Some Bizzare in September 1982.

== Background ==
Untitled was Almond's first album away from Soft Cell and was made in collaboration with a number of artists, including Matt Johnson of The The and Anni Hogan. The album was produced by the band, with assistance from Stephen Short (credited as Steeve Short) and Flood.

Jeremy Reed writes in his biography of Almond, The Last Star, that Untitled was "cheap and starkly recorded". He states that Almond received "little support from Phonogram for the Mambas project, the corporate viewing it as non-commercial and a disquieting pointer to the inevitable split that would occur within Soft Cell". An article in Mojo noted that "from the beginning, Almond and Ball had nurtured sideline projects, though only the former's – the 1982 double 12-inch set Untitled – attracted much attention, most of it disapproving." The article mentions that Almond "who preferred to nail a song in one or two takes" stated that it was all "about feel and spontaneity, otherwise it gets too contrived" when accused of singing flat.

Simon Price of The Independent quotes Almond as calling the album "the deluded ramblings of self-indulgence fuelled by too much acid".

The album was released on gatefold double vinyl, with the first record playing at 33 rpm and the second at 45 rpm. The album reached number 42 in the UK Albums Chart.

== Critical reception ==
Professional ratings
Review scores
Source	Rating
AllMusic	3/5 stars
Smash Hits	6/10
Sounds	3.5/5 stars

Neil Tennant, then a journalist at Smash Hits, reviewed the album saying that the band "have obviously enjoyed producing some intriguing, if self-indulgent, new music and their own versions of some old favourites". Stephen Thomas Erlewine of AllMusic also calls the album "intriguing" but states that Untitled "doesn't ever add up to anything cohesive", whilst acknowledging that Almond has "made a conscious departure from Soft Cell".

== Track listing ==
Side A
No.	Title	Written by	Length
1.	"Untitled"	Marc Almond, Matt Johnson	4:54
2.	"Empty Eyes"	Almond, Annie Hogan	5:03
3.	"Angels"	Almond, Johnson	8:34

Side B
No.	Title	Written by	Length
1.	"Big Louise"	Scott Walker, from Scott 3	5:05
2.	"Caroline Says"	Lou Reed, from Berlin	3:39
3.	"Margaret"	Hogan	3:45
4.	"If You Go Away"	Jacques Brel, originally "Ne me quitte pas"	6:28

Side C
No.	Title	Written by	Length
1.	"Terrapin"	Syd Barrett	4:18
2.	"Twilights & Lowlifes"	Marc and the Mambas	11:29

Side D
No.	Title	Written by	Length
1.	"Twilights & Lowlifes (Street Walking Soundtrack)"	Marc and the Mambas	11:08

== Personnel ==
Marc and the Mambas

- Marc Almond – lead vocals, synth, vibraphone
- Matt Johnson – all instruments, electric guitar, percussion
- Ann Hogan – instruments, piano, electric piano, synth, vibraphone
- Cindy Ecstacy – backing vocals
- Peter Ashworth – percussion

Technical

- Paul Buckmaster – string arrangement on "Big Louise"
- Flood, Steeve Short – engineer
- Val Denham – cover portrait

== Chart performance ==
Chart (1983)	Peak position
UK Albums (Official Charts)	42
