= Stories of Johnny =

Studio album by Marc Almond and The Willing Sinners
- Released: September 1985
- Recorded: Late 1984 – early 1985
- Studio: Hartmann Digital Studios, Bavaria, Battery Studios, London, Power Plant Studios, London, Odyssey Studios, London
- Genre: Art pop
- Length: 43:59
- Label: Some Bizzare, Virgin
- Producer: Mike Hedges

Marc Almond and The Willing Sinners chronology
Vermin in Ermine (1984)	Stories of Johnny (1985)	Mother Fist and Her Five Daughters (1987)

Singles from Stories of Johnny
- 1. "Stories of Johnny" b/w "Stories of Johnny (with The Westminster City School Choir)" Released: August 1985; 2. "Love Letter" b/w "Love Letter (with The Westminster City School Choir)" Released: October 1985; 3. "The House is Haunted by the Echo of Your Last Goodbye" b/w "Broken Bracelets" Released: January 1986

Stories of Johnny is the second studio album by the British singer/songwriter Marc Almond. It was released in September 1985 and reached number 22 on the UK Albums Chart. Stories of Johnny includes the singles "Stories of Johnny", "Love Letter" and "The House is Haunted".

Almond with his assembled band The Willing Sinners, made up of Annie Hogan, Billy McGee, Martin McCarrick, Richard Riley and Steven Humphreys, accompanied by studio musicians recorded the songs for album at Hartmann Digital Studios in Bavaria and Battery Studios, Power Plant Studios and Odyssey Studios in London. The artwork was designed by Huw Feather with photography by Andy Catlin.

Professional ratings
Review scores
Source	Rating
AllMusic	4.5/5 stars
The Encyclopedia of Popular Music	3/5 stars
Smash Hits	9.5/10 stars

== Track listing ==
All tracks are written by Marc Almond; except where indicated

Side one
No.	Title	Writer(s)	Length
1.	"Traumas Traumas Traumas"		5:07
2.	"Stories of Johnny"		3:45
3.	"The House is Haunted"	Basil "Rose" Adlam	2:19
4.	"Love Letter"		4:51
5.	"The Flesh is Willing"		4:45

Side two
No.	Title	Length
6.	"Always"	6:03
7.	"Contempt"	3:36
8.	"I Who Never"	4:31
9.	"My Candle Burns"	3:49
10.	"Love and Little White Lies"	5:13

CD bonus tracks
No.	Title	Length
11.	"Stories of Johnny" (with Westminster City School Choir)	4:18
12.	"Love Letter" (with Westminster City School Choir)	5:28

== Personnel ==
- Marc Almond – vocals, all arrangements

The Willing Sinners

- Annie Hogan – piano, vibes, synthesizer, marimba
- Martin McCarrick – cello, synthesizer
- Richard Riley – guitar
- Billy McGee – bass guitar
- Steven Humphreys – drums

with:

- Martin Ditcham – percussion
- Enrico Tomasso – trumpet, flugelhorn
- Julie Allis – harp
- Gini Ball – violin
- Jane West – backing vocals
- Audrey Riley – backing vocals

Technical

- Mike Hedges – Producer
- Tom Thiel – Engineering (Haartman)
- Stephen McLaughlin – Engineering (Battery)
- Ben Rogan – Engineering (Powerplant)
- Pete Brown – Engineering (Powerplant)
- Marc Frank – Engineering (Odyssey)
- Paul Batchelor – Engineering (Odyssey)
- Huw Feather – Design
- Andy Catlin – Photography
