= Soul Mining =

Studio album by The The
- Released: 21 October 1983
- Recorded: 1982–1983
- Studios: Mediasound (New York City); The Garden (London); Advision (London); SARM (London)
- Genres: Pop; post-punk; synth-pop
- Length: 41:42
- Labels: Some Bizzare; Epic
- Producers: Paul Hardiman; Matt Johnson

The The chronology
Burning Blue Soul (1981)	Soul Mining (1983)	Infected (1986)

Alternative cover
- 2002 CD remaster

Singles from Soul Mining
- 1. "Uncertain Smile" Released: October 1982; 2. "Perfect" Released: 11 February 1983; 3. "This Is the Day" Released: 2 September 1983

Soul Mining is the debut (Note: The 1981 album Burning Blue Soul was originally released by the band's frontman Matt Johnson as a solo album, but later reissues credited it to the The.) studio album by the English post-punk and synth-pop band the The. Matt Johnson, the lead singer and songwriter behind the The, began recording the album in New York City, after a bidding war between major record labels resulted in the group signing a recording contract with CBS Records. The initial recording sessions were aborted after the album's first two singles, however, and Johnson returned to London where he wrote and recorded the rest of the record. Musically, Soul Mining is a post-punk and synth-pop album with influences of the early 1980s New York club scene, while Johnson's lyrics focus on relationship insecurities and social alienation, with imagery derived from dreams.

Soul Mining was released in the United Kingdom on 21 October 1983 on Some Bizzare Records/Epic Records and included versions of the singles "Uncertain Smile", "Perfect", and "This Is the Day". Although the album received positive reviews, its initial sales were modest, reaching number 27 in the UK and charting in a number of other countries, but in 2019 the album was certified gold in the UK. Soul Mining was reissued in June 2014 as a two-disc 30th anniversary deluxe version on vinyl, attracting retrospective reviews which universally praised the record, with critics describing it as both Johnson's best work and one of the best albums of the 1980s.

== Background and initial New York recording sessions ==
Following the release of Burning Blue Soul (1981), Matt Johnson had started work on a follow-up, provisionally titled The Pornography of Despair. Although Burning Blue Soul had been released on the 4AD record label, the The had also released a one-off single, "Cold Spell Ahead", in 1981 on the Some Bizarre label run by Stevo, and major record labels were expressing interest in Some Bizarre's acts following the worldwide success of synth-pop duo Soft Cell.

Johnson and Stevo decided that the best way to achieve commercial success was to record a new version of "Cold Spell Ahead". Stevo verbally agreed a singles deal with London Records, and in May 1982 the label sent Johnson to New York to record the new version of the song, now retitled "Uncertain Smile", with Soft Cell's producer Mike Thorne at Mediasound Studios. The song followed Johnson's original demo, with a Roland TR-808 providing the drumbeat and Johnson and Thorne playing guitars, bass and synthesizers. While in New York, Johnson visited Manny's Music store on West 48th Street, and was fascinated by a toy xylimba that he saw there. He bought the instrument and returned to the studio with it, using it to create an intro for "Uncertain Smile". On the recommendation of a friend Thorne also brought in Crispin Cioe of the Uptown Horns to play flute and alto saxophone on the record.

When Stevo took the finished song back to London he reneged on his verbal agreement with London Records and initiated a bidding war, eventually won by CBS Records, and the The were signed to CBS's Epic imprint. The single became the The's first release on Epic, released in October 1982 and reaching number 68 on the UK singles chart. Thorne was unhappy at the underhand way in which the deal had been conducted.

Johnson and Stevo returned to New York in October 1982 to record a second song with Thorne. The track was "Perfect", which was a reworked version of a song written for The Pornography of Despair and originally titled "Screw Up Your Feelings". Johnson wanted a harmonica on the record, and Thorne suggested his friend David Johansen of the New York Dolls. However, the second session at Mediasound did not go as smoothly as the first one had. In the intervening period Johnson had gone from being unemployed to receiving a rumoured £80,000 advance from CBS. With his new-found wealth Johnson was keen to experience what New York had to offer, disappearing from the studio to explore the Lower East Side and take drugs, which left him in an unfit state to record. Johnson and Stevo also decided to make a road trip to Detroit, with Johnson saying that he had felt compelled to visit the city during the recording of "Perfect" because he felt he was being inauthentic singing the song's lyrics about down-and-outs unless he had experienced it personally, and that "although I hadn't lived there, I knew that I'd seen more than virtually any of the other bands in the charts so I had no reason to feel bad about it".

The relationship between Thorne and the visitors deteriorated as a result of Johnson and Stevo's actions, and disagreements over the songs' production. Thorne wanted to use his new Synclavier unit, but Johnson preferred the sounds of his far cheaper Omnichord. Eventually a mutual decision was made to abandon the recordings, and Johnson returned to London in November.

The original New York-produced 7" single versions of "Uncertain Smile" and "Perfect" were included on the The's greatest hits album 45 RPM: The Singles of The The in 2002, while the two 12" versions were included on the second disc of the 30th anniversary reissue of Soul Mining in 2014.

== Composition and themes ==
Having returned to London with only two songs, CBS asked Johnson if he had any other material that could be used. In response, Johnson began to re-record his unfinished album The Pornography of Despair, but he was not happy with the new versions of the songs, feeling that they lacked impact. He abandoned the album entirely, and decided to write a new album from scratch instead, with "The Sinking Feeling" being the only song retained from The Pornography of Despair.

The rest of the songs for Soul Mining were written during 1983, either in Johnson's bedsit in Highbury or in the flat of his girlfriend Fiona Skinner, in Braithwaite House in Finsbury. Johnson's preferred method of writing was lying on the floor with a pencil and notepad, spending hours writing and rewriting the songs, and his demos were recorded using a guitar, drum machine, synthesizers and a Portastudio that Johnson had bought. Although Johnson had learnt how to create tape loops and overdub tracks during his job as a tape operator at De Woolf studios when he was a teenager, he did not have a sequencer, so he would play the lines for each instrument over and over – for the longer tracks like "I've Been Waiting for Tomorrow (All of My Life)" and "Giant", this could mean playing for up to ten minutes at a time.

In an interview with Melody Maker in May 1983, five months before the album's release, Johnson shared fragments of the lyrics that he was working on, and said that many of them were based on mental images and states of mind. He explained one image, "I'm floating into harbour in a soggy cardboard box", saying, "I've always had this weird thing about the sea, incredibly deep and cold". He also quoted another lyric in progress: "The sun is high and I've been out on the verandah sitting in life's proverbial rocking chair, blanket over my knees", and then explained that "I've always had these images on my mind, very strange dreams. The idea of a clear blue sky, a massive sky in the desert with this little American hut, a verandah, a guy in a rocking chair watching planes flying across the sky, philosophising about his past life". However, he stated that another line, "I'm in the corner of an overgrown garden, head between my knees, trying not too breathe too loudly" (an early version of the opening lines from "I've Been Waitin' for Tomorrow") was based on a real incident from his childhood, when he had broken into a house – when the police arrived, he had fled into the garden and hidden in a chicken hut.

In interviews for the 2014 reissue Johnson stated that some of the earlier songs such as "Uncertain Smile" and "The Twilight Hour" had the theme of "unrequited love", although as he had fallen in love with Skinner while writing the album, the later songs explored other themes. "I've Been Waitin' for Tomorrow (All of My Life)" was about the cognitive dissonance and confusion created by media propaganda. He rejected his reputation for writing depressing lyrics, saying that they were "supposed to be uplifting, but thoughtful. A poignant reflection."

== Recording ==
Following their return to London from New York, Stevo recommended that Johnson should contact Thorne's former engineer Paul Hardiman to act as his new producer. Hardiman's first job for Johnson was to remix "Perfect" for release as a single, keeping only Johansen's harmonica from the original New York recording. The remix was done on Christmas Eve 1982, which Hardiman recalled had caused some friction with his wife. The remixed version of "Perfect" was released as a single on 11 February 1983, reaching number 79 in the UK.

While the songs for the album were being written, Johnson and Hardiman set about looking for a recording studio in London. Although the only two studios credited in the liner notes for Soul Mining are Advision and Sarm, Johnson has since stated in several interviews that the majority of the album was recorded at the Garden studio in Shoreditch, east London.

Throughout May 1983 The The held a weekly residence of concerts at the Marquee Club in central London, featuring many of Johnson's musician friends from the British post-punk scene. Johnson used these concerts to decide which musicians he wanted to contribute to the forthcoming the The album. These included Orange Juice drummer Zeke Manyika, do-it-yourself synthesizer pioneer Thomas Leer, and the experimental Australian musician JG Thirlwell, credited on the album as one of his early aliases "Frank Want", and who would go on to achieve some degree of recognition recording under the name Foetus.

"Uncertain Smile" was re-recorded for the album, keeping the xylimba intro but replacing Crispin Cioe's saxophone solo with a lengthy piano solo by Jools Holland. The idea to include a piano solo resulted from the Garden studio having a Yamaha C3 baby grand piano, and it was suggested to Johnson that Holland would be a good choice to play it. Johnson recalled that Holland had turned up on a hot summer's day in full motorbike leathers, listened to a couple of minutes of the song as a run-through, and then played his solo in one take, with a second drop-in afterwards. In his 2007 autobiography Barefaced Lies and Boogie-Woogie Boasts Holland recounted that when he first listened to the track he had expected to hear his contribution used as an instrumental break in the middle of the song, only to discover that Johnson had edited together the two solos and used them as the song's outro instead.

== Artwork ==
As with many of the The's early albums and singles, the original cover artwork was created by Matt Johnson's brother Andrew, a.k.a. "Andy Dog". The UK album cover featured a painting of one of the wives of Fela Kuti smoking a joint, adapted from a photograph Andy had seen in The Face. Johnson liked the painting, feeling that its colours and African connections fitted with Soul Mining's musical style, and insisted on using it for the album cover, despite Andy's reservations about its suitability. Andy had made a second painting featuring Johnson's head in profile and apparently screaming while being attacked by hammers, which was used for the cover of the US release. In a 2014 interview with Electronic Sound Johnson stated that his brother had been correct, and it would have been better to have used the second painting for the cover of the album in all territories. The 2002 remastered CD reissue replaced the original cover art with an early photograph of Matt Johnson.

Graphic designer Fiona Skinner, who had become Johnson's girlfriend in 1982, created the bespoke typeface used on Soul Mining. The album and the single "This Is the Day" marked the first appearance of the band's logo, which also used Skinner's font, and which would be used on the majority of the The's subsequent releases.

== Release and promotion ==
"This Is the Day" was released ahead of the album as a single on 2 September 1983, but like the previous singles, it performed poorly in the UK, peaking at number 71.

Soul Mining was released on 21 October 1983. The album was released with several different track listings, depending on the format and the territory. In the UK and Europe the album had seven tracks and ended with "Giant", as Johnson had intended. Early pressings of the original UK vinyl album included a free 12" single of an extended remix of "Perfect", with "Fruit of the Heart" and "Soup of Mixed Emotions" as the B-sides (catalogue number XPR 1250). However, in the US a record company executive decided that seven songs was not enough for a full album, and a re-recorded version of "Perfect" was added to the US version of Soul Mining, as well as some versions of the Canadian release, much to Johnson's annoyance. This extra track was also included on the album when it was first released on CD in June 1987, in both the UK and the US. In Australia and New Zealand, the album contained nine tracks, with "Fruit of the Heart" closing side one and "Perfect" at the end of side two. It was not until the The's early albums were remastered and reissued in 2002 that Johnson finally succeeded in having Soul Mining reissued without "Perfect", as originally intended.

The US cassette version also included extended mixes of "I've Been Waitin' for Tomorrow (All of My Life)" and "This Is the Day" added on to the end of each side of the cassette.

The UK cassette version contained the original seven-track album on side one, with "Perfect" plus five other extra tracks on side two. It is generally assumed that these tracks had originally been recorded for the unreleased project The Pornography of Despair. The extra tracks are "Three Orange Kisses from Kazan", "The Nature of Virtue", "Mental Healing Process", "Waitin' for the Upturn", and "Fruit of the Heart". The tracks were all later used as B-sides on various The The single and promo releases, or on film/soundtrack compilation releases, although "Waitin' for the Upturn" is the only track never to have appeared on CD.

The 2014 2-LP "30th Anniversary Deluxe Edition" box set of Soul Mining includes an authentic vinyl reproduction of the 1983 release, with audio remastered in 2013 (overseen by Matt Johnson at Abbey Road Studios), and is expanded with a second vinyl containing alternate versions, 12"'s and remixes, intended to complete a "purist album experience".

== Critical reception ==
Professional ratings
Contemporary reviews
Review scores
Source	Rating
Record Mirror	4/5 stars
Rolling Stone	3/5 stars
Smash Hits	8/10
Sounds	5/5 stars

The album was well received on its release. Don Watson of NME said, "In days when the pop song has been reduced to the reiteration of catch-phrases, Matt Johnson flexes a rare literary flair. More importantly he has the command of music's immense possibilities to carry them through without self-indulgence. Ignore this LP if you must, but you'll be ignoring one of the year's rare heart-stopping moments." In Melody Maker Steve Sutherland said, "As you return to Soul Mining again and again, there will be times when you discover it was the last thing you really wanted to do. It will sound mawkish, almost absurd, like a voice crying wolf over and over ... Then again, there'll be times when it will sound obscenely close to the bone, as if [Johnson] were invading and defiling your most private thoughts and emotions ... In other words, you'll use Soul Mining as a barometer to your day and if that's the principal function of great pop, then surely Soul Mining is great pop." Dave Henderson of Sounds called the album "a classic slice of everyman's everyday music, ready made for the radio, the dancefloor and those thoughtful interludes late at night". In Record Mirror Jim Reid wrote that Johnson was "not always able to find a soundtrack to complement his lyrical angst" but that "if Soul Mining is not the complete Matt Johnson it is an intriguing first taste".

In the US, Kurt Loder of Rolling Stone praised Johnson's "sense of structure and his unerring ear for sonic definition" and highlighted "Uncertain Smile" and the "entirely gorgeous piano solo by the exceptionally talented Holland", but had reservations about the "obsessively self-absorbed lyrics... Youthful angst and anomie are fine in their place, but not all over the place." However, Loder concluded, "Johnson creates pop music with an agreeably individual stamp: In the current sea of synth-pop sludge, Soul Mining stands out". Cashbox thought that the tracks on the album were "unique, blending a wide variety of instrumentation to produce cuts that are individually distinctive."

Professional ratings
Legacy reviews
Aggregate scores
Source	Rating
Metacritic	92/100
Review scores
Source	Rating
AllMusic	3.5/5 stars
Classic Pop	4/5 stars
The Guardian	5/5 stars
The Line of Best Fit	9/10
Mojo	4/5 stars
PopMatters	8/10
Q	4/5 stars
Record Collector	4/5 stars
Uncut	9/10
Wondering Sound	4/5 stars

The release of the 30th anniversary deluxe edition in 2014 received universal praise from music critics. Michael Bonner of Uncut described the record as a "masterpiece" and said, "Released in the interzone between post-punk and synth pop, and reflecting both, Soul Mining thrums with ideas, tension and dread. Johnson's enduring lyrical concerns – social alienation, political disillusionment and troubles of the heart – are all present and correct, but unlike the industrial/psychedelic adventuring of Burning Blue Soul, they are here given a glossier sheen... Certainly, for an album of heavy themes, Soul Mining is musically surprisingly light." He concluded, "Soul Mining is arguably Johnson's defining work: ambitious, strange, exciting. And, 30-odd years on, remarkably fresh." In Q Peter Paphides described the album as being "like one long distress signal from someone being held against their will inside a Sartre novel". He stated, "The years might not have been quite so kind to Soul Mining were it not for the inspired guest performances that Johnson teased out of his collaborators", singling out Holland's piano solo as "a high point on an album full of them".

Alexis Petridis of The Guardian noted Holland's "genuinely astonishing performance" and said, "The lyrics contained the occasional hint of histrionic gaucheness – 'the cancer of love has eaten out my heart' seems a pretty melodramatic way to say you got dumped – but more often they're strikingly precocious: 'Uncertain Smile''s brilliant drawing of a confused relationship, 'The Twilight Hour''s painfully accurate depiction of self-obsession... More striking still is the ease with which Johnson marshals a kaleidoscopic array of musical influences into something coherent and unique. Quite aside from Holland's boogie-woogie piano, over the course of Soul Mining's seven tracks, you variously hear folk fiddles and accordion, the popping basslines of contemporary funk, punishing industrial beats, electronics derived from New York's then current club music... But Soul Mining never sounds disjointed, never feels like an exercise in smart-alec showboating: Johnson's songwriting holds its disparate elements tightly together." He concluded, "Soul Mining is a brilliant and very idiosyncratic album. Maybe that's why it's never really cited as an influence these days: you can't hope to mimic something this personal and unique."

=== Legacy and accolades ===
Melody Maker placed Soul Mining at number three in its critics' list of the best albums of 1983 and the NME placed it at number 25 in its own list the same year. In 1989 Record Mirror and Sounds both included the album in their critics' lists of the albums of the decade, Record Mirror ranking it at number eight and Sounds ranking it at number 24.

Reviewing the remastered reissue in 2002, PopMatters said, "It may not make the list of best records of the '80s, but it's damn close, and would definitely stir some intense debate over its inclusion." A supplement entitled "80 from the 80s" in the August 2007 issue of Mojo included Soul Mining as one of only four albums from 1983 to make its list of the 80 best albums of that decade, and three months later in November 2007 The Guardian included Soul Mining in its list of 1000 Albums to Hear Before You Die, where it stated that Johnson's "artful pop ... hides an underlying menace at odds with the chart-toppers of the time".

The album was also included in the books 1001 Albums You Must Hear Before You Die and Fear of Music: The Greatest 261 Albums Since Punk and Disco by journalist Garry Mulholland, who described it as "a hidden masterpiece".

== Track listing ==
All tracks written by Matt Johnson.

=== Vinyl LP ===
Side one

1. "I've Been Waitin' for Tomorrow (All of My Life)" – 5:45
2. "This Is the Day" – 5:01
3. "The Sinking Feeling" – 3:44
4. "Uncertain Smile" – 6:52
5. "Fruit of the Heart" (Australia and New Zealand releases only) – 1:57

Side two

1. "The Twilight Hour" – 5:58
2. "Soul Mining" – 4:50
3. "Giant" – 9:36
4. "Perfect" (Australia, New Zealand, Canada and US releases) – 5:36

=== UK and Europe cassette ===
Side one

1. "I've Been Waitin' for Tomorrow (All of My Life)" – 5:45
2. "This Is the Day" – 5:01
3. "The Sinking Feeling" – 3:44
4. "Uncertain Smile" – 6:52
5. "The Twilight Hour" – 5:58
6. "Soul Mining" – 4:50
7. "Giant" – 9:36

Side two

1. "Perfect" – 5:36
2. "Three Orange Kisses from Kazan" – 4:27
3. "The Nature of Virtue" – 5:50
4. "Mental Healing Process" – 3:45
5. "Waitin' for the Upturn" – 4:30
6. "Fruit of the Heart" – 1:57

=== US and Canada cassette ===
Side one

1. "I've Been Waitin' for Tomorrow (All of My Life)" – 5:45
2. "This Is the Day" – 5:01
3. "The Sinking Feeling" – 3:44
4. "Uncertain Smile" – 6:52
5. "I've Been Waitin' for Tomorrow (All of My Life)" [Special Mix] – 7:36

Side two

1. "The Twilight Hour" – 5:58
2. "Soul Mining" – 4:50
3. "Giant" – 9:36
4. "Perfect" – 5:36
5. "This Is the Day" [12" Version] – 5:22

=== CD ===
1. "I've Been Waitin' for Tomorrow (All of My Life)" – 5:45
2. "This Is the Day" – 5:01
3. "The Sinking Feeling" – 3:44
4. "Uncertain Smile" – 6:52
5. "The Twilight Hour" – 5:58
6. "Soul Mining" – 4:50
7. "Giant" – 9:36
8. "Perfect" (1987 release only) – 5:36
- The original 1987 CD release of Soul Mining added "Perfect" at the end of the album after "Giant". The 2002 remastered reissue removed the track, thus leaving the album's track listing as Matt Johnson originally intended.

=== 2-LP 30th Anniversary Deluxe Edition ===
Disc one

Track listing as the original UK vinyl version.

Disc two – "Recollected"

Side one

1. "Uncertain Smile" (New York 12" Version) – 10:00
2. "Perfect" (New York 12" Version) – 9:01

Side two

1. "This Is the Day" (12" Version) – 5:26
2. "Fruit of the Heart" – 1:54
3. "Perfect" (London 12" Version) – 5:41
4. "I've Been Waitin' for Tomorrow (All of My Life)" (12" Mix) – 7:39
- Note: On all versions of the album, the track "Giant" is stylised in all caps.

== Personnel ==
- Matt Johnson – vocals, synthesisers, percussion, instruments on all tracks, chant on "Giant"
- Harry Beckett – trumpet on "Perfect"
- Paul Boyle – fiddle on "This Is the Day"
- Andy Duncan – drums on "This Is the Day", "Uncertain Smile", "Soul Mining" and "Perfect"
- Paul Hardiman – chant on "Giant"
- Camelle G. Hinds – bass guitar on "I've Been Waitin' for Tomorrow (All of My Life)", "Uncertain Smile", "The Twilight Hour", "Giant" and "Perfect"
- Jools Holland – piano on "Uncertain Smile"
- David Johansen – harmonica on "Perfect"
- Keith Laws – melodica on "Three Orange Kisses from Kazan"
- Thomas Leer – synthesisers on "I've Been Waitin' for Tomorrow (All of My Life)", "The Twilight Hour" and "Giant"
- Martin McCarrick – cello on "The Twilight Hour"
- Zeke Manyika – drums on "I've Been Waitin' for Tomorrow (All of My Life)", "The Twilight Hour" and "Giant", chant on "Giant"
- Jeremy Meek – bass guitar on "The Sinking Feeling"
- Steve James Sherlock – flute and saxophone on "Three Orange Kisses from Kazan" and "Waitin' for the Upturn"
- Anne Stephenson – violin on "The Twilight Hour"
- Frank Want – sticks on "Giant"
- Wix – accordion on "This Is the Day"

Artwork

- Andy Johnson – artwork
- Fiona Skinner – typography

== Charts ==
Chart (1983–1984)	Peak position
Australian Albums (Kent Music Report)	70
Canada Top Albums/CDs (RPM)	22
Dutch Albums (Album Top 100)	14
New Zealand Albums (RMNZ)	16
UK Albums (Official Charts)	27

== Certifications ==
Region	Certification	Certified units/sales
United Kingdom (BPI)	Gold	100,000^{‡}
^{‡} Sales+streaming figures based on certification alone.
