= Mark Ravenhill =

English playwright and journalist

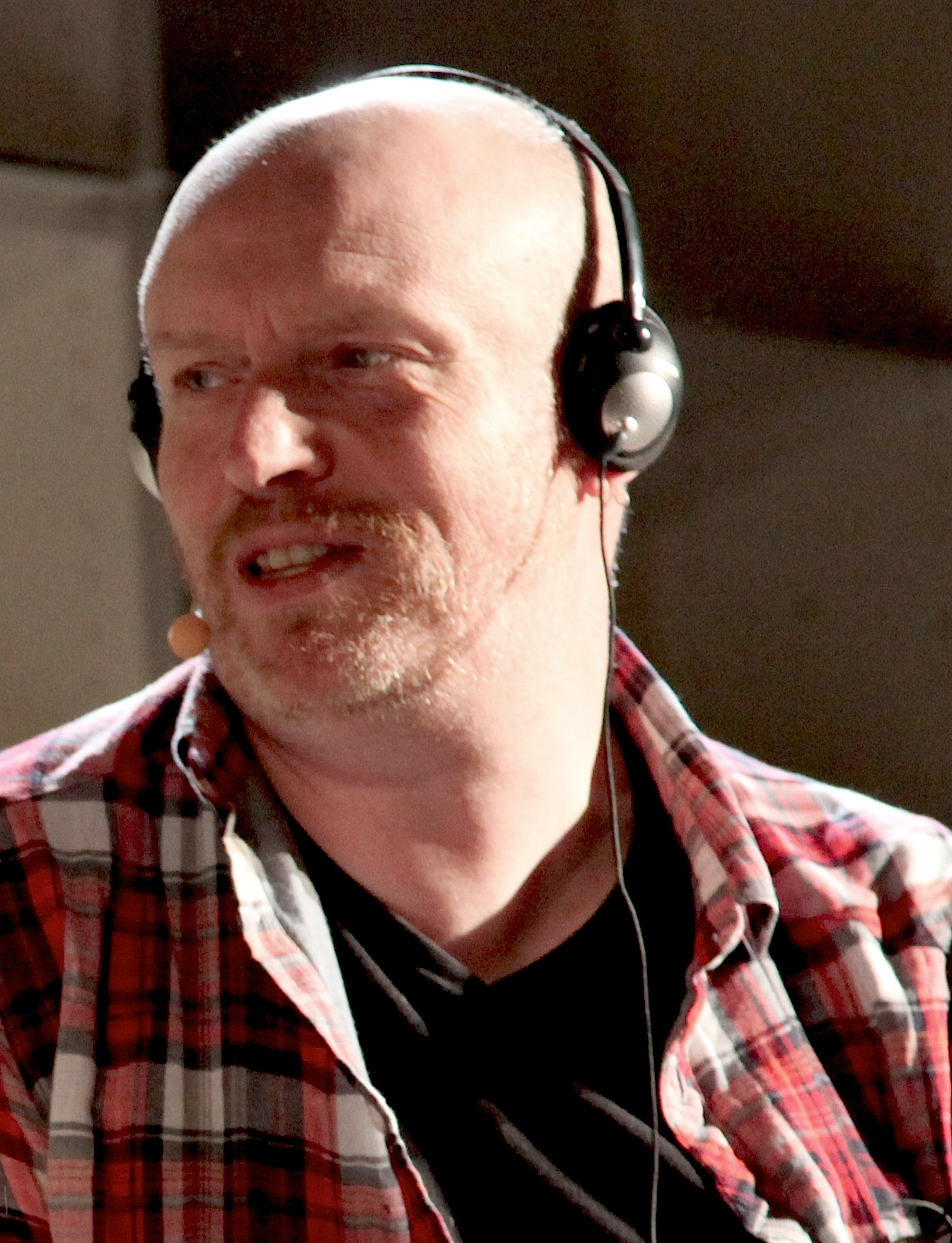
- Born: 7 June 1966 (age 60); Haywards Heath, West Sussex, England
- Education: Bristol University (1984-87)
- Occupations: Playwright, actor, journalist

Mark Ravenhill (born 7 June 1966) is an English playwright, actor and journalist.

Ravenhill is one of the most widely performed playwrights in British theatre of the late-twentieth and twenty-first centuries. His major plays include Shopping and Fucking (first performed in 1996), Some Explicit Polaroids (1999), Mother Clap's Molly House (2000), The Cut (2006), Shoot Get Treasure Repeat (2007) and The Cane (2018).

In 1999 he was one of the recipients of the V Europe Prize Theatrical Realities awarded to the Royal Court Theatre (with Sarah Kane, Jez Butterworth, Conor McPherson, Martin McDonagh).

He made his professional acting debut in his own monologue Product, at the 2005 Edinburgh Festival Fringe.

== Early life ==
Ravenhill is the elder of two sons born to Ted and Angela Ravenhill. He grew up in West Sussex, England and cultivated an early interest in theatre, putting on plays with his brother when they were eight and seven, respectively. He studied English and Drama at Bristol University from 1984 to 1987, and worked as a freelance director, workshop leader and drama teacher. In the mid-1990s, Ravenhill was diagnosed as HIV+, his partner of the early 1990s having died from AIDS.

== Career ==
His first short play, Fist, gained the attention of Max Stafford-Clark, artistic director of Out of Joint Theatre Company who asked to see his next play. Ravenhill quickly finished the play that would make his name: Shopping and Fucking. It is set among a mostly young, queer group of friends and captured a generation using sex, drugs, popular culture and therapy to replace a fundamental lack of history, value and political commitment. The play toured with two successful runs at the Royal Court Theatre and then the West End, before embarking on world tours. It was one of the British plays that were picked up by German theatres to establish a new generational wave of directors, writers, and audiences.

Ravenhill followed this with a series of plays that shared Shopping and Fucking's punky, gender-queer aggression, including Faust Is Dead (1997), Handbag (1998), Some Explicit Polaroids (1999). The plays did not necessarily share the attitudes of their characters and contained ironic commentary beneath the violence and intensity. Faust is Dead explored some queer post-modern ideas, with nods to Jean Baudrillard; Some Explicit Polaroids adopted some features of the 'State of the Nation Play', an epic left-wing theatre style associated with the 1970s. Each play simultaneously endorsed and critiqued the intellectual styles and movements that they were working in.

Handbag was a response to Oscar Wilde's The Importance of Being Earnest, making more explicit a sense of contemporary identities being connected to a longer history. This was brought even more to the fore in Mother Clap's Molly House, set in an eighteenth-century molly house and depicting a range of gender-nonconformists from a pre-gay, pre-queer era exploring dissident sexualities. The play was directed by Nick Hytner who became artistic director of the National Theatre the year after, bringing in Ravenhill as a key advisor.

Through the 2000s, Ravenhill moved further away from naturalism, continually changing styles and forms. His play The Cut moves into Pinteresque territory, its metaphorical image of a near-future society organised around an unspecified surgical procedure (the 'cut' of the title) was an allegory of liberal authoritarianism. Shoot Get Treasure Repeat began as a series of short (usually 20-minute) plays performed over successive mornings at the Edinburgh Festival in 2007, under the title Breakfast with Ravenhill (for which he received the Spirit of the Fringe award). Retitled collectively Shoot Get Treasure Repeat they were performed across London by the Gate Theatre, the Royal Court, the National Theatre, Paines Plough and others. Product (2005), his monologue for two people (the second actor is silent) was a satire of Hollywood and attitudes to terrorism post-9/11. pool (no water) was written for the physical theatre company Frantic Assembly and concerned a group of artists who lament and celebrate the death of their successful colleague; the text was written in fragments, observing the speech patterns of the Young British Artists and the hypocrisies of artistic rivalry. Each of these texts move away from direct representations of the contemporary world towards something more abstract, minimalist, metaphorical.

He continued to write a range of works, including a pantomime, Dick Whittington (2006), for the Barbican Theatre; a piece for, about and performed by the drag performer Bette Bourne entitled A Life in Three Acts (2009); and a series of plays for young people: Totally Over You (2003), Citizenship (2005) and Scenes from Family Life (2007).

At the end of the 2000s, Ravenhill collaborated with Ramin Gray in directing his own Over There, an experimental play and performance about twins separated by the Berlin Wall for the Royal Court. He also worked in music theatre, creating libretti for Monteverdi's The Coronation of Poppea and a new music-theatre piece Ten Plagues written for Marc Almond (both 2011). As Writer-in-Residence for the Royal Shakespeare Company, he produced a new translation of Brecht's Life of Galileo and a dramatisation and response to Voltaire's Candide (both 2013). At the end of the decade he collaborated with Robbie Williams and Guy Chambers on a musical adaptation of David Walliams's The Boy in the Dress (2019). He was commissioned by the London Gay Men's Chorus for a piece to mark the choir's 21st anniversary in 2012. With the music composed by Conor Mitchell, the piece, entitled Shadow Time, explores the evolution of mentalities in respect of homosexuality in the lifetime of the Chorus and was premiered at the Royal Festival Hall in May 2012 during the Chorus' summer concert: A Band of Brothers. He returned to the Royal Court in 2018 with The Cane, about a schoolteacher whose distant history as an administer of corporal punishment threatens his reputation, his family even his life.

He created ITV sitcom Vicious with Gary Janetti which aired between 2013 and 2016, and in 2014 wrote a Doctor Who audio story entitled Of Chaos Time The for Big Finish.

In 2021, Ravenhill was appointed co-artistic director of the King's Head Theatre for 2022. In a 2021 interview with Benjamin Yeoh, Ravenhill explained he was looking to programme more queer and LGBTQ+ work as a co-artistic director.

In September 2023, the Royal Central School of Speech and Drama announced that Ravenhill would be joining their teaching staff as a Visiting Lecturer and co-tutor, focusing his time on the Writing for Performance BA degree.

Ben and Imo, which opened at the Swan Theatre, Stratford-upon-Avon on 21 February 2024, is a 'reimagined for 2024' and staged version of the 2013 radio play Imo and Ben. Set in 1953, it explores collaboration and conflict between two composers, Benjamin Britten and Imogen Holst.

== Plays ==
- Fist (1995)
- Shopping and Fucking (1996)
- Faust Is Dead (1997)
- Sleeping Around (1998)
- Handbag (1998)
- Some Explicit Polaroids (1999)
- Mother Clap's Molly House (2000)
- Feed Me (Radio Play) (2000)
- Totally Over You (2003)
- Education (2004)
- Citizenship (2005)
- Product (2005)
- The Cut (2006)
- Pool (No Water) (2006)
- Ravenhill For Breakfast (2007)
- Scenes From Family Life (2007)
- Shoot/Get Treasure/Repeat (2008)
- Over There (2009)
- The Experiment (2009)
- Nation (2009)
- Ten Plagues - A Song Cycle (2011)
- Candide (2013)
- Ghost Story (2015)
- The Cane (2018)
- The Boy in the Dress (2019)
- Ben and Imo (2024)

== Opera translations ==
- The Coronation of Poppea by Monteverdi (2011)
