= Conor Mitchell =

Northern Irish composer

Conor Mitchell is a Northern Irish composer, librettist and theatre-maker.

His play, The Dummy Tree, was commissioned by the Royal National Theatre for their 2009 New Connections series.

== Early life and education ==
Conor Mitchell grew up in Lurgan, Northern Ireland, where he attended school. His family line includes a long history of Irish folk musicians from County Armagh. He was later educated at Methodist College, Belfast and the University of York, where he studied music with the composers David Blake and Nicola LeFanu

== Personal life ==
Mitchell identifies as a member of the queer community and has written several works that highlight the rights of gay people. He has publicly shared his struggle with alcoholism, which nearly claimed his life. He entered recovery in 2014 and has since become an advocate for others battling addiction.

== Career ==
Mitchell’s major influences are Benjamin Britten, Stephen Sondheim, Bertolt Brecht, Kurt Weill, and Friedrich Dürrenmatt.

== Complete works ==
=== Music theatre ===
- Have a Nice Life
- Goblin Market based on Christina Rossetti's poem Goblin Market
- Matilde based on Guy de Maupassant's story, "La Parure" (The Necklace).
- Merry Christmas Betty Ford
- The Dummy Tree For the National Theatre's Connections festival.
- Ten Plagues - A Song Cycle (2011, text by Mark Ravenhill)
- The C**t of Queen Catherine - a recitation for actor and ensemble,(2016) first performed by The Belfast Ensemble at the MAC, Belfast.
- Propaganda
- The Young Pornographers
- Riot Symphony: The Sun Still Shines (2024) with Ulster Orchestra based on Pussy Riot, Sinéad O'Connor, & Sophie Scholl

=== Opera ===
- The Musician
- Our Day (2012) a short opera. Libretto by Mark Ravenhill
- Abomination - A DUP Opera (2018)

=== Film ===
- Pretty Face
