= Something's Gotten Hold of My Heart =

1967 single by Gene Pitney

Single by Gene Pitney

from the album Just One Smile
- B-side: "Building Up My Dream World"
- Released: September 1967
- Genre: Pop
- Length: 3:37
- Songwriters: Roger Greenaway; Roger Cook

Gene Pitney singles chronology
"Tremblin" (1967)	"Something's Gotten Hold of My Heart" (1967)	"The More I Saw of Her" (1968)

"Something's Gotten Hold of My Heart" is a song written by Roger Greenaway and Roger Cook.

Originally recorded by Gene Pitney in 1967, the latter's version of the song reached No. 5 on the UK Singles Chart in December 1967, but failed to chart in the United States. The song was subsequently covered by a number of other artists.

It achieved its greatest success in 1988 when the UK-based Some Bizzare Records label released a cover version by Marc Almond. Originally recorded by Almond alone for his 1988 album The Stars We Are, the single version was remixed to also include new vocals from Gene Pitney. Their version became a number one single in the UK for four weeks in January 1989.

== Marc Almond and Gene Pitney duet version ==
"Something's Gotten Hold of My Heart"

Single by Marc Almond featuring Gene Pitney

from the album The Stars We Are
- B-side: "Something's Gotten Hold of My Heart" (solo version); "The Frost Comes Tomorrow"
- Released: 3 January 1989
- Genre: Pop
- Length: 4:41
- Label: EMI
- Songwriters: Roger Greenaway; Roger Cook
- Producer: Bob Kraushaar

Marc Almond singles chronology
"Bitter Sweet" (1988)	"Something's Gotten Hold of My Heart" (1989)	"Only the Moment" (1989)

Marc Almond originally recorded the song as a solo track for his album The Stars We Are and was released as a follow-up to his single "Bitter Sweet". By then, Gene Pitney had heard of Almond's version and offered to re-record it with him, as a duet. This version replaced the solo version, which was put on the B-side of the single. The duet reached number one on the UK Singles Chart in January 1989. A music video featuring the duo was filmed on-location in Las Vegas.

=== Weekly charts ===
Weekly chart performance for "Something's Gotten Hold of My Heart"
Chart (1989)	Peak position
Australia (ARIA)	24
Austria (Ö3 Austria Top 40)	2
Belgium (Ultratop 50 Flanders)	2
Europe (Eurochart Hot 100)	1
Finland (Suomen virallinen lista)	1
France (SNEP)	8
Ireland (IRMA)	1
Italy Airplay (Music & Media)	2
Netherlands (Dutch Top 40)	5
Netherlands (Single Top 100)	5
New Zealand (Recorded Music NZ)	4
Sweden (Sverigetopplistan)	7
Switzerland (Schweizer Hitparade)	1
UK Singles (Official Charts)	1
West Germany (GfK)	1

=== Year-end charts ===
Year-end chart performance for "Something's Gotten Hold of My Heart"
Chart (1989)	Position
Austria (Ö3 Austria Top 40)	11
Belgium (Ultratop)	14
Europe (Eurochart Hot 100)	14
Netherlands (Dutch Top 40)	51
Netherlands (Single Top 100)	59
Switzerland (Schweizer Hitparade)	15
West Germany (Media Control)	11

== Cover versions ==
The song was covered by Vicky Leandros in 1968, along with a Greek version the same year titled "To Mistiko Sou" ("Your secret") on her Greek album Vicky (To Mistiko Sou) which became a hit. It was also covered in 1968 by French singer Herbert Léonard. Following Marc Almond's success across Europe, in 1989 Leandros released a 12-inch remix of "To Mistiko Sou" in Greece which topped the Greek charts. Since its release, both the English and Greek versions of the song have appeared on various Leandros compilations worldwide.

Nick Cave and the Bad Seeds covered the song on the 1986 album Kicking Against the Pricks.

In 1990, The Shadows recorded an instrumental cover of the song on their studio album Reflection.

The song was featured in the 2015 film The Lobster, where it was performed as a duet by Garry Mountaine and Olivia Colman.
