= The Velvet Trail =

Studio album by Marc Almond
- Released: 9 March 2015
- Recorded: Magical Thinking Studio (Los Angeles), Dean Street Studios
- Genre: Pop
- Length: 54:31
- Label: Strike Force Entertainment / Cherry Red Records
- Producer: Christopher Braide

Marc Almond chronology
Ten Plagues – A Song Cycle (2014)	The Velvet Trail (2015)	Against Nature (2015)

Special UK CD Edition cover
- Artwork for the limited edition CD

The Velvet Trail is the twentieth solo studio album by the British singer/songwriter Marc Almond. It was released by Strike Force Entertainment / Cherry Red Records on 9 March 2015.

== Background ==
The Velvet Trail is Almond's first album of original material since Varieté in 2010. It was produced by Christopher Braide and features a duet with Beth Ditto of indie rock band Gossip on the track "When the Comet Comes".

Almond had previously stated that he would no longer record albums of original material following Varieté. He subsequently recorded a number of albums outside of the pop genre which mostly featured songs written by others. During this time he was approached by Braide, known for his work with pop artists such as Lana Del Rey, David Guetta and Britney Spears, who urged Almond to make "the ultimate Marc Almond album" Braide was a longtime fan of Almond and had in fact worked with Almond before, unbeknownst at that point to the singer. Almond explained the situation to Simon Price of The Quietus, stating "it was only afterwards that I realised where I knew Chris Braide from: he'd sung backing vocals on the Soft Cell reunion album Cruelty Without Beauty, and I'd passed him in the corridor". Braide lured Almond back into songwriting by sending him three instrumental tracks, "hoping to change his mind about retirement", a plan that worked when "all three were met with resounding enthusiasm". They continued to work in this manner until the album was completed.

The 'Velvet Trail' of the album title refers to a beach walk in Southport, Almond's home town. The walk is a local tourist spot and is part of the Wetlands Regional Park maintained by Lancashire County Council.

The album was released in a standard one disc jewel case CD, a limited edition two disc digipak UK only version and a limited edition double vinyl version. The limited CD edition includes a DVD containing videos to four of the tracks on the album. The double vinyl version comes with a poster and has alternative takes of two of the songs as bonus tracks, including a solo version of "When the Comet Comes". The artwork for each version is slightly different; the standard CD features blue colouring, the limited double CD has red, different, colouring and the vinyl version is a negative image.

The Velvet Trail was supported by a UK tour from 16 April to 1 May 2015.

== Critical reception ==
Professional ratings
Aggregate scores
Source	Rating
Metacritic	79/100
Review scores
Source	Rating
Record Collector	5/5 stars
The Guardian	4/5 stars
The Observer	4/5 stars
PopMatters	7/10 stars
MusicOMH	3.5/5 stars

On the Metacritic website, which aggregates reviews from critics and assigns a normalised rating out of 100, the album received a score of 79. This is based on 11 reviews in total, 10 of which were positive and one which was mixed. Record Collector gave the album full marks in their review, stating ""Marc's distinctive vocals have rarely sounded richer and warmer" and that The Velvet Trail is "a release up there with Almond's best". The Guardian calls the album "straight-ahead pop, with big choruses and melodies" and comments that "Almond's voice....is still enthralling" The review in The Observer states that Almond's "first set of original material in five years is an impressive affair" and adds that "Almond is at his best on the compelling torch songs that have long been his stock in trade" The PopMatters review site states that "The Velvet Trail is a complete and coherent artistic statement" and that it is "only more special for its rarity" On MusicOMH they find it a "strong and often stirring album, and the voice sounds fantastic".

== Track listing ==
All tracks written by Chris Braide and Marc Almond

1. "Act One (Instrumental)" – 0:50
2. "Bad to Me" – 4:22
3. "Zipped Black Leather Jacket" – 3:57
4. "Scar" – 3:42
5. "Pleasure's Wherever You Are" – 4:27
6. "Act Two (Instrumental)" – 0:48
7. "Minotaur" – 4:29
8. "Earthly" – 4:22
9. "The Pain of Never" – 4:14
10. "Demon Lover" – 3:25
11. "Act Three (Instrumental)" – 1:08
12. "When the Comet Comes" – 3:40
  - featuring Beth Ditto
13. "Life in My Own Way" – 4:08
14. "Winter Sun" – 4:00
15. "The Velvet Trail" – 5:50
16. "Finale (Instrumental)" – 1:09

Bonus tracks (vinyl release only)

13. # "When the Comet Comes (full length solo version)" – 4:06
14. "The Velvet Trail (radio edit)" – 3:27

== Personnel ==
- Marc Almond – lead vocals, backing vocals
- Christopher Braide – synths, grand piano, electric guitar, acoustic guitar, programming
- Neal X – electric guitar
- Martin McCarrick – strings
- Kimberlee McCarrick – strings
- Louise Marshall – backing vocals
- Kelly Barnes – backing vocals
- Armen Ra – theremin

== Chart performance ==
Chart (2015)	Peak position
Scottish Albums (OCC)	88
UK Albums (OCC)	62
UK Independent Albums (OCC)	12
