= Open All Night (Marc Almond album) =

Studio album by Marc Almond
- Released: March 1999
- Recorded: Matrix and Maison Rouge recording studios
- Genre: Synthpop
- Length: 56:54
- Label: Blue Star Music
- Producer: Kenny Jones, Marc Almond

Marc Almond chronology
Fantastic Star (1996)	Open All Night (1999)	Stranger Things (2001)

Singles from Open All Night
- 1. ""Black Kiss"" Released: October 1998; 2. ""Tragedy (Take a Look and See)"" Released: March 1999; 3. ""My Love (Dave Ball remix)"" Released: November 1999

Open All Night is the tenth solo studio album by the British singer-songwriter Marc Almond. It was released by Blue Star Music in March 1999.

== Background ==
Following the commercial failure of his 1996 album Fantastic Star, Almond released Open All Night on his own newly founded label Blue Star Music. The album features collaborations with Siouxsie Sioux and Budgie (from The Creatures) on the track "Threat of Love" and with Kelli Ali, who was at that time the lead vocalist of the band Sneaker Pimps, on the track "Almost Diamonds". "Tragedy", "Black Kiss" and "My Love" were released as singles, but neither they nor the album itself charted.

The American release of the album came with the bonus track "Beautiful Losers".

== Critical reception ==
Professional ratings
Review scores
Source	Rating
NME	7/10 stars
Hot Press	9/12 stars
Encyclopedia of Popular Music	3/5 stars
Release Magazine	8/10

The NME describe the songs on Open All Night as inhabiting "an evocative Brel-meets-Barry landscape" with a "midnight blue melancholy". Touching on similar themes the review from Hot Press describes Open All Night's "lush decadence and tragic dissolution". Elsewhere, reviewer Keith Phipps in his review for The A.V. Club magazine states that "Almond's songs have a creepy, dark quality" on this album.

== Track listing ==
1. "Night & Dark" (Marc Almond, Neal Whitmore) – 6:10
2. "Bedroom Shrine" (Almond, Oskar Paul) – 4:32
3. "Tragedy (Take a Look and See)" (Almond, Whitmore) – 5:01
4. "Black Kiss" (Almond, Whitmore) – 3:35
5. "Almost Diamonds" (Almond, Whitmore, Kelli Ali) – 5:16
  - Guest Appearance Kelli Ali
6. "Scarlet Bedroom" (Almond, John Green) – 3:06
7. "My Love" (Almond, Whitmore) – 3:45
8. "Heart in Velvet" (Almond, Whitmore) – 4:14
9. "Open All Night" (Almond, Whitmore) – 5:20
10. "Threat of Love" (Almond, Whitmore) – 4:41
  - Guest Appearance: The Creatures (Siouxsie Sioux and Budgie)
11. "Bad People Kiss" (Almond, Douglass) – 3:34
12. "Sleepwalker" (Almond, Whitmore) – 4:19
13. "Midnight Soul" (Almond) – 3:51

Bonus track (in USA)

1. "Beautiful Losers" (Almond) – 4:57

== Personnel ==
- Marc Almond – vocals and vocal arrangements
- Neal X – guitar, effects, additional programming and assistant production
- Glen Scott – Hammond organ, Wurlitzer, piano and keyboards
- John Green – extra keyboards, string keyboards, pre-production and demo programming
- Rick May – bass and double bass
- Bill Miskimmin – harmonica
- Oliver Langford – violin
- Vladimir Asriev – violin
- Igor Outkine – accordion
- Elliott Douglass – piano
- Henrique da Silva – macumba voice
- Jorge Batista – congas, bongos, Brazilian percussion and Orisha chant
- Esteve Dasilva – Brazilian percussion
- Hossam Ramzy – Egyptian percussion
- Tim Sanders – tenor saxophone
- Roddy Lorimer – trumpet
- Simon Clarke – alto saxophone
- Rebecca S Doe – string arrangement
- Oliver Kraus – cello
- Lucy Wilkins – violin
- Sophie Sirota – viola
- Ann-Marie Gilkes – backing vocals
- Angela Morel – backing vocals
- M Stewart – backing vocals
- Richard Wayler – backing vocals
