= Ten Plagues – A Song Cycle =

Studio album by Marc Almond
- Released: 7 July 2014
- Recorded: Dean Street Studios
- Genre: Dark cabaret, opera
- Length: 56:17
- Label: Strike Force Entertainment / Cherry Red Records
- Producer: Austen Jux-Chandler

Marc Almond chronology
| The Dancing Marquis (2014) | Ten Plagues – A Song Cycle (2014) | The Velvet Trail (2015) |

Ten Plagues – A Song Cycle is the nineteenth solo studio album by the British singer/songwriter Marc Almond. It was released by Strike Force Entertainment / Cherry Red Records on 7 July 2014.

== Background ==
Ten Plagues is a 2014 studio recording of the 2011 Edinburgh Festival Fringe Award-winning stage production of the same name. The production was performed again at Wilton's Music Hall in 2013 and was well reviewed.

The production is a song cycle duet for voice and piano and was written by Mark Ravenhill with music by Conor Mitchell. Almond wanted to work with Ravenhill after he saw the latter's Mother Clap's Molly House production, so he approached Ravenhill who wrote the Ten Plagues libretto in response.

Ten Plagues is about the Great Plague of London of 1665 on one level but also acts as a metaphor for "the hysteria with which the public habitually greets all threats of mass infection, from swine flu to SARS" and alludes to the "first onrush of AIDS".

The CD was released as a double digipak and came with a DVD of the live stage show filmed at Wilton's Music Hall.

== Critical reception ==
Professional ratings
Review scores
| Source | Rating |
|---|---|
| The Times | 4/5 stars |
| Financial Times | 2/5 stars |
| Louder Than War | 9/10 stars |
| Mojo | 3/5 stars |

The studio recording was not as well reviewed as the live show and divided critics. The Financial Times review by Ludovic Hunter-Tilney finds the libretto "routine" and calls the piano score "atonal", summarising that "the results fall flat". Neil Gardner of The Times liked it better, naming it "grimly fascinating" calling the piano score "barreling", whilst "versatile" Almond's vocals are "soaring". David Sheppard writes in the Mojo review that "Almond tackles often tricky, convoluted melodies with great gusto" but closes by stating that accompanying live DVD "makes more sense".

== Track listing ==
Libretto by Mark Ravenhill, music by Conor Mitchell.

1. "Spring" –1:44
2. "A Comet" – 2:41
3. "Without a Word" – 4:50
4. "To Dream" – 2:55
5. "Market" – 1:59
6. "The Pit" – 3:44
7. "Farewell" – 3:00
8. "By Day" – 2:36
9. "A New Law" – 1:52
10. "Seeing You" – 5:34
11. "The Wig" – 4:32
12. "The Hermit" – 3:22
13. "Grief" – 4:05
14. "Quacker" – 2:57
15. "Return" – 5:48
16. "Ten Plagues / Epilogue" – 4:38

== Personnel ==
- Marc Almond – vocals
- Conor Mitchell – piano
