= Torment and Toreros =

Studio album by Marc and the Mambas
- Released: August 1983 (Reissued in 1987, 1992, 1997, 2004, and 2009)
- Recorded: January–May 1983
- Studio: Trident Studios, London
- Genre: Alternative rock, gothic rock, new wave
- Length: 88:17
- Label: Some Bizzare
- Producer: Marc Almond

Marc and the Mambas chronology
Untitled (1982)	Torment and Toreros (1983)	Bite Black and Blues (1984)

Singles from Torment and Toreros
- 1. "Black Heart" Released: June 1983 (UK); 2. "Torment" Released: November 1983 (UK)

Professional ratings
Review scores
Source	Rating
Allmusic	2/5 stars

Torment and Toreros is the second album to be released by Marc and the Mambas. The album reached #28 on the UK album charts in August 1983. The song "Torment" was written by Marc Almond, Steven Severin of Siouxsie and the Banshees, and Robert Smith of The Cure. It also is the last studio album to go under the name "Marc and the Mambas"; the Mambas' third album, Bite Black and Blues, credited to "Raoul and the Ruined", is a live album and was initially only available via the Marc Almond fan club.

== Track listing ==
All tracks composed by Marc Almond, except where indicated.

=== Disc 1 ===
1. "Intro" (Almond, Sally Mambas) – 3:17
2. "Boss Cat" (Almond; original lyrics: Anne Stephenson, Gini Hewes) – 4:17
3. "The Bulls" (Jacques Brel) – 2:18
4. "Catch a Fallen Star" – 5:12
5. "The Animal in You" (Almond, Mambas) – 7:19
6. "In My Room" (Joaquin Prieto; English lyrics: Lee Pockriss, Paul Vance) – 3:01
7. "First Time" – 3:38
8. "(Your Love Is A) Lesion" – 5:38
9. "My Former Self" (Almond, Annie Hogan) – 2:45
10. "Once Was" (Almond, The Venomettes) – 5:10

Universal Music Japan 2004 Extra Tracks

1. "Fun City" – 7:49
2. "Sleaze Take It, Shake It" – 7:17
3. "Sleaze Taking It, Shaking It" – 7:15

=== Disc 2 ===
1. "The Untouchable One" (Almond, Jenkinson) – 6:03
2. "Blood Wedding" (Traditional Spanish; arranged by Marc and the Mambas) – 01:51
3. "Black Heart" (Almond, Hogan) – 04:50
4. "Medley: Narcissus/Gloomy Sunday/Vision" (Almond, Steve Sherlock/Sam M. Lewis, Rezső Seress/Peter Hammill) 11:46
5. "Torment" (Almond, Steven Severin, Robert Smith) – 4:21
6. "A Million Manias" (Almond, Foetus) – 5:52
7. "My Little Book of Sorrows" (Marc Almond) – 5:59
8. "Beat out that Rhythm on a Drum" (Georges Bizet, Oscar Hammerstein II) – 5:00

Universal Music Japan 2004 Extra Tracks

1. "Your Aura" (Marc Almond) – 6:18
2. "Mamba" (Mambas, Marc Almond) – 12:05
3. "First Time" – 3:38 (Venomettes, Almond)
4. "You'll Never see Me on a Sunday" (Almond, Hogan) – 2:51

Some Bizzare 2009 Extra Tracks

1. "Your Aura" (Marc Almond) – 6:18
2. "You'll Never see Me on a Sunday" (Almond, Hogan) – 2:51
3. "Mamba" (Mambas, Marc Almond) – 12:05

== Personnel ==
Marc and the Mambas

- Marc Almond – guitar, percussion, vocals
- Annie Hogan – piano, harpsichord, Farfisa organ, vocals
- Lee Jenkinson – bass, guitar, drums, vocals
- Steve Sherlock – flute, saxophone

with:

- Matt Johnson – guitar
- Peter Ashworth – drums, timpani
- Frank Want – drums
- The Venomettes – string arrangements
  - Anne Stephenson – violin
  - Billy McGee – double bass
  - Ginny Hewes – violin
  - Martin McCarrick – cello

Technical

- Flood, Marc Almond – mixing
- Huw Feather – cover design
- Peter Ashworth – photography
