= Tears Run Rings (song) =

Single by Marc Almond

from the album The Stars We Are
- B-side: "Everything I Wanted Love to Be"
- Released: 22 August 1988
- Genre: Electronic; synthpop
- Length: 4:20 (7" & album version); 5:10 (12" Extended Version); 7:08 (Justin Straus remix); 7:09 (La Magia Dance mix)
- Label: Parlophone; Capitol; EMI
- Songwriter(s): Marc Almond
- Producer(s): Annie Hogan; Billy McGee; Marc Almond; Steven Humphreys

Marc Almond singles chronology
"Mother Fist" (1987)	"Tears Run Rings" (1988)	"Bitter Sweet" (1988)

"Tears Run Rings" is a 1988 song by English musician Marc Almond from his 1988 album The Stars We Are.

In addition to the standard 7" single, two 12-inch versions were released in 1988, one containing the 7" version and the 12" extended remix, and another containing two further extended remixes by Justin Straus and Almond's own band La Magia. All three releases included the B-side track "Everything I Wanted Love To Be". Various limited editions of the single were also released including a 7" numbered edition box set that included two postcards, a badge, a booklet and the 7" vinyl single. A red vinyl 12", and a single-sided etched vinyl 12" single was also issued, as was a standard 3-track CD-single.

The song has been considered Almond's most overtly political song he released. As a solo artist, it was his only song to chart in the United States, reaching number 67 in early 1989. Despite this, the song was popular in Europe and charted in a few European countries. A Deluxe Edition re-release of The Stars We Are included all of the various mixes of the song, and a DVD featuring both music videos for "Tears Run Rings", one for the UK and one for the US.

== Charts ==
=== Weekly charts ===
Chart (1988)	Peak position
Belgium (Ultratop)	11
Italy Airplay (Music & Media)	1
Netherlands (Single Top 100)	8
UK (OCC)	26

Chart (1989)	Peak position
Germany (GfK Entertainment Charts)	32
US (Billboard Hot 100)	67
