= Stranger Things (Marc Almond album) =

Studio album by Marc Almond
- Released: 18 June 2001
- Recorded: Dreamhouse Studios, Brittania Row
- Genre: Electropop
- Length: 50:49
- Label: Blue Star Music / XIII BIS Records
- Producer: Jóhann Jóhannsson

Marc Almond chronology
Open All Night (1999)	Stranger Things (2001)	Heart on Snow (2003)

Singles from Stranger Things
- 1. ""Glorious" b/w "Fur" & "Give In"" Released: June 2001

Stranger Things is the eleventh solo studio album by the British singer/songwriter Marc Almond. It was released by Blue Star Music, in conjunction with XIII BIS Records, on 18 June 2001.

== Background ==
According to an article in Billboard magazine, the sound of Stranger Things "finds a middle ground between the spare gothic synth-pop of Open All Night and the orchestral grandeur of 1991's Tenement Symphony. Almond employed the services of Jóhann Jóhannsson, Icelandic multi-instrumentalist, composer and producer, to produce the album. Jóhannsson also plays most of the instruments, with some assistance from other musicians from Iceland, and is responsible for many of the arrangements. The tracks "Come Out" and "Love in a Time of Science" were originally written by Jóhannsson's band Dip, the latter of which had previously been recorded and released as the song "Telepathy" by Icelandic singer Emiliana Torrini on her 1999 album Love in the Time of Science.

The German version of the album contains the bonus track "Amo Vitam", featuring and written by the German band Rosenstolz. This follows a prior collaboration where Almond sang guest vocals on the Rosenstolz single "Total Eclipse".

The first pressings of both the English and the German versions came in an embossed jewel case.

== Critical reception ==
Professional ratings
Review scores
Source	Rating
Allmusic	3/5 stars
entertainment.ie	4/5 stars
Record Collector	3/4 stars
Hot Press	8/12 stars
The Guardian	3/5 stars
Encyclopedia of Popular Music	4/5 stars

Critics generally liked the album but with reservations. The sound of the album has been described by Allmusic as "dreamy and swooning" and states that Almond "sounds in absolutely excellent voice". The Guardian doesn't fully concur with this point of view, allowing that whilst the production lends the album a "veneer of lush sophistication" it "has done little to alleviate the worst of Almond's voice". Another review agrees that the "production is lush and most of the songs sweep by with grace and style" whilst conceding that "Almond's voice is definitely an acquired taste".

== Track listing ==
1. "Glorious" (Jóhann Jóhannsson, Peter Hallgrimsson, Marc Almond) – 4:44
2. "Born to Cry" (Neal Whitmore, Almond) – 4:58
3. "Come Out" (Jóhannsson, Siggi Baldursson, Sjón) – 4:52
4. "Under Your Wing" (Almond, Whitmore, John Green) – 5:26
5. "Lights" (Almond, Jóhannsson) – 4:17
6. "Tantalise Me" (Almond, Jóhannsson) – 4:08
7. "Moonbathe Skin" (Almond, Whitmore) – 4:10
8. "Dancer" (Almond, Jóhannsson) – 3:27
9. "When It's Your Time" (Almond, Whitmore) – 4:14
10. "End in Tears" (Almond, Jóhannsson) – 3:19
11. "Love in a Time of Science" (Jóhannsson, Baldursson) – 4:54
12. "Glorious (Reprise)" (Jóhannsson, Hallgrimsson, Almond) – 2:35

Bonus track (German release only)

13. "Amo Vitam" (AnNa R., Peter Plate, Ulf Leo Sommer) – 4:57
  - Duet with the German band Rosenstolz.

== Personnel ==
- Marc Almond – vocals
- Jóhann Jóhannsson – ARP Odyssey, piano, synthesizer, Farfisa, ARP Explorer, Rhodes, glockenspiel, Stylophone, Hammond organ, programming, string arrangement, orchestration
- Sara Guðmundsdóttir – backing vocals
- Simon Langford – extra keyboards, string arrangement
- Vidar Hákon Gislason – additional programming
- Siggi Baldursson – drums, percussion
- Luke Gordon – additional programming
- John Green – additional strings, arrangement, additional keyboards
- Samuel Jon Samuelson – conducting, orchestration
- Hordur Bragason – Hammond organ
- Peter Hallgrimson – guitar
- Neal Whitmore – string arrangement

== Charts ==
Chart performance for Stranger Things
Chart (2022)	Peak position
Scottish Albums (OCC)	63
UK Independent Albums (OCC)	18
