= The Stars We Are =

Studio album by Marc Almond
- Released: 26 September 1988
- Recorded: 1988
- Studios: Matrix Studios, 35 Little Russell Street, London
- Genre: Pop sophisti-pop
- Labels: Parlophone; Some Bizzare; Capitol
- Producers: Marc Almond; Annie Hogan; Bob Kraushaar; Billy McGee

Marc Almond chronology
Singles 1984–1987 (1987)	The Stars We Are (1988)	Jacques (1989)

Singles from The Stars We Are
- 1. "Tears Run Rings" Released: 22 August 1988; 2. "Bitter Sweet" Released: 24 October 1988; 3. "Something's Gotten Hold of My Heart" Released: 3 January 1989; 4. "Only the Moment" Released: 28 March 1989

The Stars We Are is the fourth studio album by British singer/songwriter Marc Almond. It was released in September 1988, reaching number 41 on the UK Albums Chart, and 144 on the US Billboard 200 album chart. It is Almond's highest selling solo album in both countries and was certified silver by the BPI. The Stars We Are includes the singles "Tears Run Rings", "Bitter Sweet", "Something's Gotten Hold of My Heart" and "Only the Moment".

With his assembled band La Magia (made up of former Willing Sinners members Annie Hogan, Billy McGee and Steve Humphreys) and accompanied by various studio musicians, Almond recorded the album at Matrix Studios in London. The artwork was designed by Huw Feather with a cover photograph by Andy Catlin.

== Music and recording ==
The album includes a duet with the German singer Nico, titled "Your Kisses Burn", which was recorded shortly before her death. Almond also duets with Agnes Bernelle on the track "Kept Boy" (a bonus track on the CD and cassette versions of the album) and also with US singer Gene Pitney as they perform Pitney's 1967 hit "Something's Gotten Hold of My Heart". This version became a UK number one hit in early 1989 and was the UK's sixth best-selling single of that year, being certified Gold by the BPI.

Original editions of the album did not feature Almond's duet with Pitney on "Something's Gotten Hold of My Heart", and simply contained Almond's original solo version of the track instead. The duet version was recorded after the album was released and, after the success of the single in 1989, the duet was appended to CD and cassette versions and appeared in place of the original solo version on some LP versions.

"Tears Run Rings" was Almond's only solo single to peak inside the US Billboard Hot 100.

Professional ratings
Review scores
Source	Rating
AllMusic	4.5/5 stars
The Encyclopedia of Popular Music	3/5 stars
Record Mirror	5/5 stars

== Track listing ==
All tracks are written by Marc Almond; except where indicated.

Side one
No.	Title	Writer(s)	Length
1.	"The Stars We Are"	Marc Almond, Annie Hogan	3:44
2.	"These My Dreams Are Yours"		5:28
3.	"Bitter Sweet"	Almond, Hogan	3:21
4.	"Only the Moment"	Almond, Hogan	4:41
5.	"Your Kisses Burn" (Duet with Nico)		4:43

Side two
No.	Title	Writer(s)	Length
6.	"The Very Last Pearl"		4:45
7.	"Tears Run Rings"		4:22
8.	"Something's Gotten Hold of My Heart"	Roger Greenaway, Roger Cook	4:40
9.	"The Sensualist"	Almond, Hogan	5:28
10.	"She Took My Soul in Istanbul"	Almond, Billy McGee	6:22

CD bonus tracks
No.	Title	Writer(s)	Length
11.	"The Frost Comes Tomorrow" (B-side of "Something's Gotten Hold of My Heart" 12")	Almond, Hogan	4:18
12.	"Kept Boy" (With Special Guest Star Agnes Bernelle)	Almond, McGee	6:14
13.	"Something's Gotten Hold of My Heart" (Featuring Gene Pitney)	Greenaway, Cook	4:40

== Personnel ==
- Marc Almond – vocals, arrangements
- Nico – vocals on "Your Kisses Burn"
- Victoria Wilson-James – vocals on "These My Dreams Are Yours"
- Suraya Ahmed – vocals on "She Took My Soul in Istanbul"
- Gini Ball – violin
- Sue Dench – viola
- Julia Girdwood – oboe, cor Anglais
- Derek Hannigan – bass clarinet
- Sally Herbert – violin
- Annie Hogan – piano, marimba, vibraphone, arranger
- Philippa Holland – violin
- Steven Humphreys – drums, percussion, programming, timpani, sampling
- Christine Jackson – cello
- Bob Kraushaar – additional percussion, mixing, producer on "Something's Gotten Hold of My Heart"
- Billy McGee – bass, keyboards, doubek, string arranger, string conductor
- Chris Pitsillides – viola
- Jocelyn Pook – viola
- Audrey Riley – cello
- Enrico Tomasso – trumpet, flugelhorn
- Chris Tombling – violin
- Audrey Ahmed – vocals
- Agnes Bernelle – vocals

== Charts ==
Weekly chart performance for The Stars We Are
Chart (1988)	Peak position
Austrian Albums (Ö3 Austria)	15
Dutch Albums (Album Top 100)	26
Finnish Albums (Suomen virallinen albumilista)	16
German Albums (Offizielle Top 100)	9
Swiss Albums (Schweizer Hitparade)	5
UK Albums (Official Charts)	41
US Billboard 200	144

== Certifications ==
Certifications for The Stars We Are
Region	Certification	Certified units/sales
United Kingdom (BPI)	Silver	60,000^{^}
^{^} Shipments figures based on certification alone.
