= Marc and the Mambas =

British new wave band

- Also known as: Raoul and the Ruined, Marc Almond and Friends
- Genres: New wave, dark cabaret, gothic rock, alternative rock
- Years active: 1982–1983, 2012
- Label: Some Bizzare
- Members: Marc Almond; Anni Hogan; Lee Jenkinson; Gini Ball; Cindy Ecstacy; Martin McCarrick; Anne Stephenson; Steve James Sherlock; Peter Ashworth; Audrey Riley; Matt Johnson; Jim Foetus
- Website: marcalmond.co.uk

Marc and the Mambas were a new wave group, formed by Marc Almond in 1982 as an offshoot project from Soft Cell. The band's line-up changed frequently, and included Matt Johnson from The The and Annie Hogan, with whom Almond worked later in his solo career.

== History ==
Marc and the Mambas marked the start of Marc Almond's career outside of Soft Cell. In 1983, Almond and Soft Cell were very close to the avant-garde scene around Foetus, Psychic TV and Einstürzende Neubauten. Almond also took part as one of four members of The Immaculate Consumptive, a group initiated by Lydia Lunch; they never released any album but did a few shows in New York and Washington D.C. at the end of 1983. Further members were Jim Foetus and Nick Cave. Marc and the Mambas belonged to that scene, and continued the dark themes explored within Soft Cell, but musically used different instruments and more complex rhythms.

The group's lineup was fluid, with members changing with each recording or performance; the only consistent members were Almond, Annie Hogan and Steve James Sherlock. Further members included Billy McGee and Martin McCarrick, who also later joined Almond when he formed Marc Almond and the Willing Sinners. Almond's Soft Cell partner David Ball was an associated member for the Mambas' first single "Sleaze", and Matt Johnson from The The was a member for the first and second album, but did not join for the last concerts in 1983 (put to vinyl and later to CD as Raoul & The Ruined – Bite Black + Blues). Jim Foetus was an associated member, and did guest vocals and percussion on "A Million Manias" and "Love Amongst the Ruined."

The Mambas' second Some Bizzare released album, Torment and Toreros, contained a mix of ballads, both with and without dance beats, and is a mix of vaudeville, French chanson, and goth sensibility, using guitar noise, piano, and string sections. Almond later described this recording as an "attempted suicide put on vinyl."

=== Post Mambas ===
Almond has had a long career as a solo artist, and Mambas musicians have worked with him under the names The Willing Sinners and La Magia. Martin McCarrick left La Magia for Siouxsie and the Banshees in 1987, and the rest of that band dissolved in 1988. Lee Jenkinson (guitar) recorded a single with producer Flood under the band name The Poppyfields, and is currently in the band Jellynail. Almond always kept in touch with some of the Mambas' core members like Anne Stephenson and Gini Ball (David Ball's ex-wife), who performed with him during his Sin, Songs And Romance gigs at the Almeida in 2004. He frequently includes Mambas songs in his live repertoire.

When Anohni from Antony and the Johnsons curated the Meltdown Festival in London in August 2012, one of the acts on the bill was Almond, who performed the album Torment and Toreros in its entirety. A few months prior to the performance, Almond stated on his webpage that Torment and Toreros "wasn't a great success at the time of release, it was mostly critically panned. It was called a 'florid musical mess', a description I quite liked", but added that "In recent years it has been re-evaluated and re-appreciated as a (flawed) masterpiece, as I always hoped it would be. It is a dark album with themes of madness, depression, isolation, alienation, innocence lost and destructive love, all seen through a prism of fame. A nervous breakdown committed to vinyl".

== Main concerts ==
- 1982 A Little Black Evening - at the Royal Drury Lane Theatre - 5 December.
- 1983 Three Black Nights Of Little Black Bites - at the Duke Of York's Theatre - 26th, 27th, 28 April.
- 1983 Bite Black and Blues - at the Duke Of York's Theatre - 18 December.
- 2012 Torment and Toreros - at the Royal Festival Hall - 9 August (as Marc Almond).

== Discography ==
=== Studio albums ===
Year	Album information	Chart positions
Year	Album information	UK
1982	Untitled: Released: September 1982; Labels: Some Bizzare, Phonogram	42
1983	Torment and Toreros: Released: August 1983; Labels: Some Bizzare, Phonogram	28

=== Live albums ===
Year	Album information
1984	Bite Black + Blues (as Raoul And The Ruined): Released: May 1984, December 2000; Labels: Gutter Hearts, Blue Star Music; The LP was an official fan-club release. The reissue was an official website release, Live at the Duke Of York's Theatre, December 1983. The reissue has bonus tracks from the same concerts.
2012	Three Black Nights of Little Black Bites – Live at the Duke Of York's Theatre, 1983: Released: 12 November 2012; Labels: Strike Force Entertainment, Cherry Red; Limited Edition CD/DVD set. Recorded live in April 1983 during a 3-day run of concerts.

=== Singles ===
Year	Album information	Chart positions
Year	Album information	UK
1982	"Fun City" / "Sleaze (Take It, Shake It)": Released: March 1982; Labels: Some Bizzare	–
1983	"Black Heart": Released: July 1983; Labels: Some Bizzare, Phonogram	49
1983	"Torment": Released: November 1983; Labels: Some Bizzare, Phonogram	90

=== Other releases ===
- Discipline (7" flexi) - Throbbing Gristle cover, free with Flexi-Pop magazine (as Marc Almond and Friends)
- In Session Volume One (CD 2003) - at the Maida Vale Studios, BBC Radio 1, February 1983. Compilation of John Peel sessions also including a Marc Almond one.
