= Jacques (album) =

Studio album by Marc Almond
- Released: December 1989
- Recorded: 1986–89
- Studio: Milo Studios, London
- Genre: Art pop, chanson
- Length: 44:43
- Label: Some Bizzare, Rough Trade
- Producer: Charles Gray, Marc Almond

Marc Almond chronology
The Stars We Are (1988)	Jacques (1989)	Enchanted (1990)

Professional ratings
Review scores
Source	Rating
Encyclopedia of Popular Music	3/5 stars
Allmusic	4.5/5 stars

Jacques is the fifth studio album by the British singer-songwriter Marc Almond. It was released in December 1989. The album is a tribute to the Belgian singer-songwriter Jacques Brel and was instigated by Almond's collaboration with Paul Buck, who adapted Brel's original non-English lyrics specifically for Almond.

The songs for the album were recorded at Milo Studios, London, over four years. Almond was accompanied both by his assembled band (comprising "La Magia" and "Willing Sinners" members Annie Hogan, Billy McGee and Steve Humphreys) and various studio musicians. The artwork and cover painting was designed and painted by Johnny Deux.

== Track listing ==
All tracks are written by Jacques Brel; adapted by Paul Buck; except where indicated.

Side one
No.	Title	Writer(s)	Length
1.	"The Devil (Okay)" (Le Diable)		3:00
2.	"If You Need" (S'il te faut)		1:57
3.	"The Lockman" (L'Éclusier)		4:05
4.	"We Must Look" (Il nous faut regarder)		1:47
5.	"Alone" (Seul)	Brel, Shuman	3:25
6.	"I'm Coming" (J'arrive)	Brel, Gérard Jouannest, Buck	6:13

Side two
No.	Title	Writer(s)	Length
7.	"Litany For a Return" (Litanie pour un retour)	Brel, François Rauber, Buck	2:00
8.	"If You Go Away" (Ne me quitte pas)	Brel, Rod McKuen	4:15
9.	"The Town Fell Asleep" (La ville s'endormait)		5:35
10.	"The Bulls" (Les toros)	Brel, Mort Shuman	2:40
11.	"Never To Be Next" (Au suivant)		4:53
12.	"My Death" (La Mort)	Brel, Shuman	4:53

== Personnel ==
- Marc Almond – vocals, all arrangements, song adaptation
- Annie Hogan – piano on tracks A1–A5, B1–B5
- Audrey Riley – cello, string arrangements on "The Town Fell Asleep"
- Martin McCarrick – cello, accordion
- Billy McGee – double bass, oboe arrangements, string arrangements on "The Devil (Okay)", "If You Go Away" and "The Town Fell Asleep"
- Steven Humphreys – drums, percussion
- Richard Riley – guitar
- Charles Gray – keyboards
- Julia Girdwood – oboe
- Gini Ball – violin
- Maurice Horhut – piano on "I'm Coming" and "My Death"

Technical

- Charles Gray – producer, all other instrument arrangements
- Jim Toler – engineer
- Johnny Deux – cover painting
