= Annie Hogan =

British musician, record producer, composer and DJ

- Labels: Some Bizzare; Cold Spring; Downwards Records

Annie Hogan (sometimes spelled as Anni Hogan) also known as Ann Margaret Hogan is a British musician, record producer, composer and club DJ, born in 1961. Originally known for her association with British musician Marc Almond, Hogan has since collaborated with a diverse variety of artists and released solo material with Downwards Records since 2020.

== Background ==
Annie Hogan studied piano before attending Leeds University in 1979 to study politics. It was while in Leeds she met Marc Almond and Dave Ball at a local music venue. In 1980, Hogan took a year out and began DJing and promoting in local clubs. Some of her first bookings were bands like Soft Cell and the Human League. Later in London, she met Matt Johnson from the The who introduced her to Simon Fisher Turner who she began recording with on an album titled Deux Filles. It was this recording that began her working relationship with Almond, after he had heard Hogan playing on the album. Almond then asked her to collaborate on his solo material. Her first ever live concert was performing with an early line up of Marc and the Mambas at the Theatre Royal, Drury Lane. The line up consisted of Hogan, Almond and Matt Johnson.

After the Mambas disbanded, Hogan continued to work closely with Almond, writing and performing for his solo projects Raoul and the Ruined, and Marc Almond and the Willing Sinners. She co-produced her last album with Almond, The Stars We Are under the name La Magia. Hogan also arranged many of the Jacques Brel songs on Almond's album Jacques, and she also arranged for the Immaculate Consumptive. During this period, Hogan played keyboards for Barry Adamson and also Zeke Manyika on their debut solo recordings. In 1987, she toured Italy and the UK with Paul Weller and the Style Council, playing vibraphone. In 1989, she split with Almond and founded the ambient-indie-dance band Cactus Rain. Signing to Virgin Records offshoot Ten Records, the band released an album, In Our Own Time, that included the singles "Each Day", "Till Comes The Morning" and "Mystery Train"; the latter was remixed by William Orbit.

In 2009, Cold Spring re-released Hogan's 1985 EP Annie Hogan Plays Kickabye. The EP was originally on Cabaret Voltaire's Doublevision label. The Kickabye EP included Marc Almond and Nick Cave recording guest vocals and Siouxsie and the Banshees drummer, Budgie, on drums and harmonica. The re-release included the unreleased follow up EP produced by Barry Adamson and early collaborations with Yello and Simon Fisher Turner. It also included four brand new solo piano recordings of Almond/Hogan songs.

== Discography ==
=== Albums ===
- Anni Hogan - Lost In Blue (Cold Spring, 2019)
- Ann Margaret Hogan - Honeysuckle Burials (Downwards 2020)
- Ann Margaret Hogan & Regis - Reversing Into Tomorrow (Boomkat Documenting Sounds 2020)
- Ann Margaret Hogan - Funeral Cargo (Downwards, 2021)
- Ann Margaret Hogan - Without the Moon (Downwards, 2021)
- Annie Hogan - Destress of Permanence (Downwards, 2023)
- Annie Hogan - Depths of Disturbances (Downwards, 2024)
- Annie Hogan - Tongues In My Head (Downwards, 2026)

=== EP ===
- Annie Hogan – Annie Hogan Plays Kickabye (Doublevision, 1985)

=== Singles ===
- Annie Hogan – "Each Day 12" (Dinamo, 1988)
- Cactus Rain – "Mystery Train" (Virgin, 1990)
- Cactus Rain – "Till Comes the Morning" (Virgin, 1991)
- Cactus Rain – "Each Day" (Virgin, 1991)
- Anni Hogan with Lydia Lunch – "Blue Contempt" (2016) preview
- Anni Hogan with Gavin Friday – "Angels of Romance" (Cold Spring, 2019)
- Anni Hogan – "Thunderstruck" (Cold Spring, 2019)
- Anni Hogan with John Fiddler – "Lost in Blue" (Cold Spring, 2019)
- Ann Margaret Hogan – "Temporary Thing" (Downwards, 2020)

=== Guest appearances ===
- Deux Filles – Album Silence and Wisdom – Track "Fleurs Dolls" (Silence & Wisdom originally released on Papier-mâché in 1982)
- Zeke Manyika – Album – 'Call and Response' Tracks – "Red Hot (Internationally)" "This Lamp" (Polydor – ZMLP 1, Polydor – 823 053-1, Eosa Records – ZMLP 1 1985)
- Yello – Album – 'Stella' Track – "Blue Nabou"
- Barry Adamson – Album – 'Moss Side Story' Tracks – "The Man with the Golden Arm" "The Most Beautiful Girl in the World" (Mute – CD STUMM 53 1988)
- Attrition – Album – Unraveller of Angels -
- Mekon – Album – 'Piece of Work' Track – "When I Was Walt Whitman" (Wall of Sound TE324-2 2013)
- Wolfgang Flur – Album 'Eloquence' Track - "Golden Light" (Strike Force Entertainment / Cherry Red SFE046)
- Deux Filles – Album – 'Space & Time' Track – "Deep Snowdrop" (Space & Time Crépuscule / TWI 1161 2016)
- Rusty Egan – Album Welcome to the Dancefloor – Track "Love Can Conquer All"
- Regis - Album Hidden in this is the light that you miss –
- Sylph - EP Ancient Hole - Track "Ancient Hole"
