= Hymnal (disambiguation) =

A hymnal is a collection of hymns, usually in the form of a book.

Hymnal may also refer to:

- Hymnal (Hwyl Nofio album), 2002
- Hymnal (Lyra Pramuk album), 2025
