= Fantas Variations =

Remix album by Caterina Barbieri
- Released: 2 April 2021
- Length: 57:17
- Label: Editions Mego

Caterina Barbieri chronology
Ecstatic Computation (2019)	Fantas Variations (2021)	Spirit Exit (2022)

Fantas Variations is a remix album by Italian composer Caterina Barbieri. It was released on 2 April 2021 through Editions Mego.

== Background ==
Caterina Barbieri is an Italian composer based in Berlin, Germany. Fantas Variations compiles eight reworks of "Fantas", the opening track of Ecstatic Computation (2019), by other artists. It includes contributions from Evelyn Saylor with Lyra Pramuk, Annie Garlid, and Stine Janvin; Bendik Giske; Kali Malone; Walter Zanetti; Jay Mitta; Baseck; Carlo Maria; and Kara-Lis Coverdale. They were enlisted "to create a more sustainable and inclusive landscape in terms of stylistic, geographical, gender and generational balance."

The album was released on 2 April 2021 through Editions Mego.

== Critical reception ==
Professional ratings
Review scores
Source	Rating
Pitchfork	6.5/10
Uncut	8/10

Conor McTernan of Resident Advisor stated, "Fantas Variations is a superlative record that speaks to disparate audiences between experimental, classical and club circles." He added, "Across an hour of different reinterpretations, each contributor brings something unique to the altar, unified by Barbieri's imaginative vision." Miles Bowe of Bandcamp Daily wrote, "Expand, contract, or orchestrate it any way you see fit; the devastating power of 'Fantas' remains unchanged." Jonathan Williger of Pitchfork commented that "Though each artist accentuates something unique, there is something lost in nearly every single adaptation."

== Track listing ==
Fantas Variations track listing
No.	Title	Artist(s)	Length
1.	"Fantas Variation for Voices"	Evelyn Saylor (featuring Lyra Pramuk, Annie Garlid, and Stine Janvin)	7:40
2.	"Fantas for Saxophone and Voice"	Bendik Giske	7:16
3.	"Fantas for Two Organs"	Kali Malone	10:20
4.	"Fantas for Electric Guitar"	Walter Zanetti	7:29
5.	"Singeli Fantas"	Jay Mitta	12:07
6.	"Fantas Hardcore"	Baseck	4:46
7.	"Fantas Resynthesized for 808 and 202"	Carlo Maria	4:29
8.	"Fantas Morbida"	Kara-Lis Coverdale	3:07
Total length:			57:17

== Personnel ==
Credits adapted from liner notes.

- Rashad Becker – mastering
- Andreas Kauffelt – cut
- Ruben Spini – artwork, typography
- Alice Fiorelli – lettering
