= From Elevated Gangways Rivers of Molten Metal Flow =

Studio album by Hwyl Nofio
- Released: 31 March 2017
- Recorded: 1983–2008
- Genre: Experimental, avant-garde
- Length: 41.28
- Label: HWYL
- Producer: Steve Parry

Hwyl Nofio chronology
Dark (2012)	From Elevated Gangways Rivers of Molten Metal Flow (2017)

Professional ratings
Review scores
Source	Rating
The Quietus	

From Elevated Gangways Rivers of Molten Metal Flow is an album by Welsh experimental music group Hwyl Nofio, released in 2017. From Elevated Gangways Rivers of Molten Metal Flow is an avant-garde, drone, noise composition, at once a deeply personal tribute to a long lost family member and an elegy for the death of the steel industry in the place of Parry's birth - Panteg. Steve Parry originally had composed the music as a kind of soundtrack about the life of his Grandfather Herbert Parry – who worked as a Steel roller at Panteg Steel Works in Pontypool, South Wales The recording process took place over the period 1983 – 2008. In an interview with the journalist Dave McGonigle in 2004 Parry refers to having discovered lost recordings and working on the project. The project remained a work in progress until its official release in 2017.

== Track listing ==
1. "From Elevated Gangways Rivers of Molten Metal Flow (Part One)"
2. "From Elevated Gangways Rivers of Molten Metal Flow (Part Two)"

== Personnel ==
- Steve Parry – prepared guitar, church organ, bass, electronics, organ, percussion, white noise
