= Spirit Exit =

Studio album by Caterina Barbieri
- Released: July 8, 2022
- Genres: Electronic; experimental
- Length: 55:56
- Label: Light-Years
- Producer: Caterina Barbieri

Caterina Barbieri chronology
Fantas Variations (2021)	Spirit Exit (2022)	Myuthafoo (2023)

Spirit Exit is a studio album by Italian composer Caterina Barbieri. It was released on 8 July 2022 through her record label Light-Years. It received universal acclaim from critics.

== Background ==
Spirit Exit was written and recorded in Caterina Barbieri's home studio in Milan, during a two-month COVID-19 lockdown period in 2020. She drew inspiration from Teresa of Ávila, Rosi Braidotti, and Emily Dickinson. The album incorporates vocals, guitar, and strings, in addition to synthesizer. It includes an alternate version of "Knot of Spirit", the original of which was released in 2021 with vocals from Lyra Pramuk. A music video was released for the track "Broken Melody".

== Critical reception ==
Professional ratings
Aggregate scores
Source	Rating
Metacritic	82/100
Review scores
Source	Rating
Crack	7/10
Loud and Quiet	7/10
Pitchfork	7.6/10
Uncut	8/10

According to the review aggregator Metacritic, Spirit Exit received "universal acclaim" based on a weighted average score of 82 out of 100 from 5 critic scores.

Shrey Kathuria of Loud and Quiet wrote, "Equal part blissful and mysterious, Barbieri's arpeggiated synth passages narrate an abstract story that is both melancholic and charged with energy." Linnie Greene of Pitchfork stated, "Layer by layer, Spirit Exit unfolds odd-couple pairings of electronica with elements inspired by minimalism, classical guitar, and machine learning." Louis Pattison of Uncut commented that "A mood of high seriousness pervades, but Spirit Exit's blend of spirituality and futurism is often transfixing." Nic Renshaw of SLUG stated, "Between the fearless stabs at high-art poptimism and the extended exercises in hi-fi cosmic beauty, Spirit Exit offers just about everything a fan of cerebral, creative electronic music could want."

=== Accolades ===
Year-end lists for Spirit Exit
Publication	List	Rank	Ref.
NPR	The 50 Best Albums of 2022	35	
NPR	The 11 Best Experimental Albums of 2022	—	
Slant Magazine	The Best Electronic Albums of 2022	—	

== Track listing ==
All tracks are written by Caterina Barbieri.

Spirit Exit track listing
No.	Title	Length
1.	"At Your Gamut"	7:06
2.	"Transfixed"	5:13
3.	"Canticle of Cryo"	7:42
4.	"Knot of Spirit (Synth Version)"	10:19
5.	"Broken Melody"	4:26
6.	"Life at Altitude"	7:49
7.	"Terminal Clock"	5:01
8.	"The Landscape Listens"	8:17
Total length:		55:56

== Personnel ==
Credits adapted from liner notes.

- Caterina Barbieri – production, mixing, art direction
- Carlo Maria – MC-202 (6), additional mixing (2, 3, 5, 7)
- Antoine 'Chab' Chabert – mastering
- Ruben Spini – art direction
- Nicola Tirabasso – design
- Furmaan Ahmed – photography

== Charts ==
Chart performance for Spirit Exit
Chart (2022)	Peak position
UK Album Downloads (Official Charts)	45
UK Independent Albums (Official Charts)	41
