= Naked Lunch (disambiguation) =

Naked Lunch is a novel by William S. Burroughs.

Naked Lunch may also refer to:

- Naked Lunch (film), a film adaptation of the Burroughs novel
- Naked Lunch (Austrian band), a band from Klagenfurt, Austria, founded in 1991
- Naked Lunch (UK band), a UK synth pop band formed in 1979

== See also ==
- Naked at Lunch
