= Dark (album) =

Studio album by Hwyl Nofio
- Released: December 2013
- Recorded: 2009 – 2012
- Genre: Experimental, avant-garde
- Label: HWYL
- Producer: Steve Parry, Mark Beazley

Hwyl Nofio chronology
Hounded by Fury (2006)	Dark (2013)

Professional ratings
Review scores
Source	Rating
Rock-A-Rolla	(8/10)

Dark is an album by experimental music group Hwyl Nofio, released in 2012. Dark explores a landscape steeped in Parry's own personal experience, inspired by walking through his home region of South Wales with a camera and field recorder in hand. Parry provides tangible evidence of this landscape in an accompanying book that introduces the listener to a world of chilling folk myths and the resonances of his own family histories, as well as timely references to the forgotten legacies of local artists/writers.

== Track listing ==
1. "Dusk"
2. "Gone"
3. "Black Rain"
4. "Requiem for the Lost"
5. "On the Black Hill"
6. "The Swamp Where Alders Grow"
7. "Dark"
8. "Herbert the Steelroller"
9. "Anticlock"
10. "Old Crow"
11. "Fairy Folk Funeral"
12. "In That Moment"

== Personnel ==
- Steve Parry: Electric guitars, prepared violin, piano, harmonium, church organ, bass, percussion
- Mark Beazley: Bass, treatments
- Steve Parry:Art Direction/Photography
- Steve Parry:Composer
