= Neu Electrikk =

British experimental music group

- Origin: Croydon, Greater London, England, UK
- Genres: Alternative rock, new wave, post-punk, experimental
- Years active: 1978–1981
- Labels: Some Bizzare; Synesthesia
- Past members: Derek Morris; Steve Parry; Steve Sherlock; Nick Hunt; Barry Deller

Neu Electrikk were a British new wave synth band formed in Croydon, South London in 1978. The band consisted of Derek Morris (lead vocals, guitar), Steve Parry (guitar, keyboard), Steve Sherlock (saxophone, flute), Nick Hunt (bass), and Barry Deller (drums).

Neu Electrikk's sound diverged from the synth-dominated bands of the era, incorporating elements of experimental, industrial, post-punk, and new wave music. The band cited the Velvet Underground, Neu!, David Bowie and John Cage as major influences.

Neu Electrikk released 2 single/eps on the Synethesia label - Lust of Berlin/Distractions (1979) and Cover Girl/Practically Isolate/Hand/Converse of Tapes (1980).

== History ==
Having attracted a reasonable cult following on the London post-punk music circuit BBC Radio 1 DJ John Peel regularly featured them on his show. Stevo Pearce founder and manager of Some Bizzare Records discovered the band via an advert in Sounds magazine and contacted the band via their distributor Rough Trade Records. Stevo would play Neu Electrikk during his DJ/club nights and included their records in his Sounds magazine music chart. The version of "Lust of Berlin" on the Some Bizzare Album is a later recording made at ARK Studios, Kingston upon Thames.

Neu Electrikk gigged extensively, notably with The The at the Bridge house in Canning Town with Stevo as DJ. Live concerts were often erratic events consisting of long passages of improvisation, silence and noise. Neu Electrikk often took to the stage to the sound of a pre-recorded tape consisting of the voice of Frank Sinatra accompanied by bird song and the sound of an industrial hammer.

== Legacy ==
Further to Neu Electrikk disbanding, Steve Sherlock joined The The and joined Marc Almond in Marc and the Mambas,

Nick Hunt continues to collaborate as a musician and producer on his Horizontal Records label, most noticeably with British singer/songwriter Christine Leach for the Acoustic Lounge Freaks (ALF), and INSENSIBILITY. Other projects Hunt has been credited on include Dr. Ono Ishido, Hikkaduwa, Ni Kidogo, and Fumihito Watanabe.

Steve Parry has released music both as a solo artist and also as the sole permanent member of the avant-garde music ensemble Hwyl Nofio.
