= Myuthafoo =

Studio album by Caterina Barbieri
- Released: 16 June 2023
- Genres: Electronic; experimental; ambient
- Length: 32:15
- Language: English
- Label: Light-Years
- Producer: Caterina Barbieri

Caterina Barbieri chronology
| Spirit Exit (2022) | Myuthafoo (2023) |

Myuthafoo is a studio album by Italian electronic and experimental musician Caterina Barbieri. It was released in 2023 through Light-Years. It received generally favorable reviews from critics.

== Background ==
Myuthafoo is a companion album to Ecstatic Computation (2019). Both albums were written at the same time. Caterina Barbieri used the Orthogonal ER-101 modular sequencer to create Myuthafoo. The album's title is an anagram of "math of you".

The digital edition of the album was released on 16 June 2023 through her record label Light-Years. The vinyl edition and the CD edition were released on 28 July 2023 through the same label.

== Critical reception ==
Professional ratings
Aggregate scores
| Source | Rating |
|---|---|
| Metacritic | 80/100 |
Review scores
| Source | Rating |
| AllMusic | 4/5 stars |
| Pitchfork | 7.1/10 |

According to the review aggregator Metacritic, Myutahfoo received "generally favorable reviews" based on a weighted average score of 80 out of 100 from 4 critic scores.

Pitchfork's Marc Weidenbaum gave this album a 7.1 out of 10, praising Barbieri's decision to eschew vocals, summing up "at her best, Barbieri doesn't just make music; a wizard, she excites the air". Robert Barry of The Quietus wrote that "radiant lines seem to suggest that even the darkest of tunnels may still bear a brilliant light at their end" for this music. Editors at Resident Advisor chose this as a recommendation and Dash Lewis reviewed Myuthafoo writing that "it's a testament to Barbieri's skill as a composer that she's able to wring genuine emotion from such bracing music" and encourages listeners that "Barbieri uses effects to build massive sonic spaces, so listening headphones can be utterly transportive". In The Sydney Morning Herald, Annabel Ross rated this work 4 out of 5 stars, calling it "premium quality" that shows both "edgy, avant-garde" compositions as well as softness.

== Track listing ==
All tracks are written by Caterina Barbieri.

Myuthafoo track listing
| No. | Title | Length |
|---|---|---|
| 1. | "Memory Leak" | 1:18 |
| 2. | "Math of You" | 5:39 |
| 3. | "Myuthafoo" | 7:00 |
| 4. | "Alphabet of Light" | 6:50 |
| 5. | "Sufyosowirl" | 5:53 |
| 6. | "Swirls of You" | 5:34 |
| Total length: | | 32:15 |

== Personnel ==
Credits adapted from liner notes.

- Caterina Barbieri – production, mixing
- Rashad Becker – mastering
- Camille Blake – photography

== Charts ==
Chart performance for Myuthafoo
| Chart (2023) | Peak position |
|---|---|
| UK Album Downloads (Official Charts) | 63 |

== See also ==
- List of 2023 albums
