= Hwyl Nofio =

Welsh experimental music group

- Origin: United Kingdom
- Genres: Experimental, industrial, avant-garde, drone
- Years active: 1997–present
- Labels: HWYL; Fourier Transform
- Members: Steve Parry
- Past members: Trevor Stainsby; Sandor Szabo; Fredrik Soegaard; Balazs Major; Gorwel Owen, Mark Beazley

Hwyl Nofio (from Welsh meaning 'swimming fun') is a Welsh experimental music group formed by Steve Parry.

== History ==
Formed in 1997, Hwyl Nofios' approach touches on various diverse styles and genres, including, industrial music, drone, ambient and noise. Hwyl Nofio is an evolving ensemble based around its originator Steve Parry, who previously had been a founding member of the Surrealist music group Neu Electrikk and also worked with Matt Johnson of The The and Colin Potter of Nurse with Wound. Hwyl Nofio referred to the approach as a marriage of dilemmas being resolved in another space whereby the music explores and exploits an ongoing collision between harmony and disharmony. Hwyl Nofios' influences include The Velvet Underground, Neu, Jimi Hendrix, John Cage and Harry Partch, The band has over the years has consisted of Steve Parry avant-garde guitarist and multi-instrumentalist with Trevor Stainsby, Sandor Szabo, Fredrik Soegaard, Balazs Major, and Mark Beazley of the instrumental ambient group Rothko, and Gorwel Owen. In 2012, Hwyl Nofio released "DARK". In 2020, as Hwyl Nofio Parry also collaborated with artists such as Rhodri Davies and Steve James Sherlock on "Isolate".

== Installations and performance art ==
In 2016, Parry he was commissioned to create a sound/visual installation, called The Beholder's Share. The installation was a play on perception where the ambiguity in the piece elicits both a conscious and unconscious process of recognition in the observer, who responds emotionally and emphatically to the work in terms of their own life experience, therefore the artist creates the work based on their own personal sensory information and the beholder re-creates it by responding to its inherent ambiguity and makes it personal to them. His installation was exhibited at the Art Market in York.

== Discography ==
- The Singers And Harp Players Are Dumb (1999)
- Hymnal (2002)
- Anatomy of Distort (2003)
- Hounded by Fury (2006)
- Christ Distort EP
- Dark (2012)
- From Elevated Gangways Rivers of Molten Metal Flow (2017)
- Isolate (2020)

=== Compilation albums ===
- The Wire Tapper 15 (Various Artists)(Hwyl Nofio) track (Broken Again);CD )
- Brave New Wales (Various Artists) (Fourier Transform, 2008;CD box set)

=== Unreleased, limited edition and promo-only albums ===
The following full-length albums have never seen commercial release. Despite their unavailability on disc, they are included in almost every official discography issued by the band.

- "From Elevated Gangways Rivers of Molten Metal Flow" (Promo-only, 2008);CD

== See also ==
- List of ambient music artists
