= Ecstatic Computation =

Studio album by Caterina Barbieri
- Released: 3 May 2019
- Genre: Electronic
- Length: 36:06
- Label: Editions Mego
- Producer: Caterina Barbieri

Caterina Barbieri chronology
Born Again in the Voltage (2018)	Ecstatic Computation (2019)	Fantas Variations (2021)

Ecstatic Computation is a studio album by Italian composer Caterina Barbieri. It was released on 3 May 2019 through Editions Mego. It received universal acclaim from critics.

== Background ==
Caterina Barbieri is an Italian composer. She released Vertical (2014), Patterns of Consciousness (2017), and Born Again in the Voltage (2018). Ecstatic Computation is her debut studio album for Editions Mego. It was released on 3 May 2019.

Barbieri later released Fantas Variations (2021). It contains reinterpretations of the album's track "Fantas" by Evelyn Saylor, Bendik Giske, Kali Malone, Walter Zanetti, Jay Mitta, Baseck, Carlo Maria, and Kara-Lis Coverdale.

Ecstatic Computation was reissued in 2023 through Barbieri's record label Light-Years, with "Perennial Fantas" being added as a CD-only bonus track.

== Critical reception ==
Professional ratings
Aggregate scores
Source	Rating
Metacritic	84/100
Review scores
Source	Rating
AllMusic	4/5 stars
Exclaim!	9/10
Pitchfork	7.8/10
Resident Advisor	4.0/5

According to the review aggregator Metacritic, Ecstatic Computation received "universal acclaim" based on a weighted average score of 84 out of 100 from 6 critic scores.

Paul Simpson of AllMusic commented that "the album is deeper, darker, and trippier than any of her previous releases." He added, "Intense, emotional, and often revelatory, Ecstatic Computation further establishes Barbieri as a truly visionary artist." Layla Fassa of Resident Advisor stated, "Stylistic influences and sonic textures are varied, yet they're cohesive." She added, "The result is an album that's both provocative and blissful." Joseph Burnett of The Quietus stated, "Even in its most unsettling moments, such as the silent gaps that punctuate the synth notes on closer 'Bow of Perception', Ecstatic Computation retains a sense of expanding horizons and joyful experiments."

=== Accolades ===
Year-end lists for Ecstatic Computation
Publication	List	Rank	Ref.
Fact	The Best Albums of 2019	—	
The Quietus	Quietus Albums of the Year 2019	3	
Resident Advisor	2019's Best Albums	—	
The Wire	The Wire's Top 50 Releases 2019	41	

== Track listing ==
All tracks are written by Caterina Barbieri.

Ecstatic Computation track listing
No.	Title	Length
1.	"Fantas"	10:31
2.	"Spine of Desire"	1:32
3.	"Closest Approach to Your Orbit"	6:30
4.	"Arrows of Time"	4:37
5.	"Pinnacles of You"	5:47
6.	"Bow of Perception"	7:03
Total length:		36:06

2023 reissue edition CD bonus track
No.	Title	Length
7.	"Perennial Fantas"	7:48
Total length:		43:54

== Personnel ==
Credits adapted from liner notes.

- Caterina Barbieri – production
- Annie Gårlid – vocals (4)
- Evelyn Saylor – vocals (4)
- Stefano Tucci – vocals recording (4)
- Rashad Becker – mastering
- Ruben Spini – artwork
