= Cracks (Bendik Giske album) =

Studio album by Bendik Giske
- Released: 27 August 2021
- Genre: Ambient; jazz
- Length: 33:39
- Label: Smalltown Supersound
- Producer: André Bratten; Joakim Haugland

Bendik Giske chronology
Surrender (2019)	Cracks (2021)	Bendik Giske (2023)

Cracks is a studio album by Norwegian saxophonist Bendik Giske. It was released on 27 August 2021 through Smalltown Supersound. It received generally favorable reviews from critics. It was nominated for the 2022 Nordic Music Prize.

== Background ==
Bendik Giske is a Norwegian saxophonist. Cracks is his second solo studio album, following Surrender (2019). It consists of five songs. He drew inspiration from José Esteban Muñoz's book Cruising Utopia. A music video was released for the song "Flutter". Cracks was released on 27 August 2021 through Smalltown Supersound.

Prior to the album's release, Giske released Cruising (Laurel Halo Remixes), which contains Laurel Halo's two remixes of the song "Cruising".

== Critical reception ==
Professional ratings
Aggregate scores
Source	Rating
Metacritic	75/100
Review scores
Source	Rating
AllMusic	3.5/5 stars
The Guardian	4/5 stars
Pitchfork	7.5/10
Uncut	8/10

According to the review aggregator Metacritic, Cracks received "generally favorable reviews" based on a weighted average score of 75 out of 100 from 5 critic scores.

Louis Pattison of Uncut stated, "using circular breathing and a rhythmic sense derived from electronic club music, Giske spins the likes of 'Cruising' and 'Void' into bold extended pieces that are gripping in their poignancy and intensity." Paul Simpson of AllMusic described the album as "an illuminating exploration of cyclical energy, both inside and outside the body." Dave Segal of Pitchfork stated, "Throughout Cracks, Giske appears to be striving for an alien, private vocabulary with an instrument saddled with 175 years of tradition and tropes." He added, "Against great odds, he succeeds."

The album was nominated for the 2022 Nordic Music Prize.

== Track listing ==
All tracks are written by Bendik Giske, except "Cracks" written by Giske and André Bratten.

Cracks track listing
No.	Title	Length
1.	"Flutter"	4:04
2.	"Cruising"	10:26
3.	"Void"	4:27
4.	"Cracks"	8:28
5.	"Matter (Part 3)"	6:12
Total length:		33:39

== Personnel ==
Credits adapted from liner notes.

- Bendik Giske – performance
- André Bratten – performance (4), production, mixing
- Joakim Haugland – production
- Beau Thomas – mastering
- Kim Hiorthøy – artwork
