= Born Again in the Voltage =

Studio album by Caterina Barbieri
- Released: 10 August 2018
- Recorded: 2014–2015
- Studios: Elektronmusikstudion (EMS), Stockholm, Sweden
- Length: 36:50
- Label: Important
- Producer: Caterina Barbieri

Caterina Barbieri chronology
Patterns of Consciousness (2017)	Born Again in the Voltage (2018)	Ecstatic Computation (2019)

Born Again in the Voltage is a studio album by Italian composer Caterina Barbieri. It was released on 10 August 2018 through Important Records. It received universal acclaim from critics.

== Background ==
Caterina Barbieri is an Italian composer. Born Again in the Voltage is her first album since Patterns of Consciousness (2017). It was recorded at Elektronmusikstudion (EMS) in Stockholm, Sweden, from August 2014 to August 2015. It consists of four tracks: "Human Developers", "Rendering Intuitions", "How to Decode an Illusion", and "We Access Only a Fraction". Barbieri played the Buchla 200 modular synthesizer, while Antonello Manzo played cello. The album was released on 10 August 2018 through Important Records.

== Critical reception ==
Professional ratings
Aggregate scores
Source	Rating
Metacritic	81/100
Review scores
Source	Rating
Pitchfork	7.6/10
Resident Advisor	3.8/5
Tiny Mix Tapes	4/5 stars

According to the review aggregator Metacritic, Born Again in the Voltage received "universal acclaim" based on a weighted average score of 81 out of 100 from 4 critic scores.

Jonathan Williger of Tiny Mix Tapes wrote, "The four pieces presented here are dynamic, exciting compositions using sustained tones as a starting point for explorations of rhythm, harmony, and timbre." He added, "Without sacrificing any of the notions of eternity conjured by the most enveloping drone music, Barbieri has created an album that is in constant motion and expresses itself in relatively succinct ways." Miles Bowe of Pitchfork called the album "an essential document of contemporary modular-synth music from one of the instrument's great new explorers."

=== Accolades ===
Year-end lists for Born Again in the Voltage
Publication	List	Rank	Ref.
Crack	The Albums of 2018: Honourable Mentions	85	

== Track listing ==
All tracks are written by Caterina Barbieri.

Born Again in the Voltage track listing
No.	Title	Length
1.	"Human Developers"	12:48
2.	"Rendering Intuitions"	6:36
3.	"How to Decode an Illusion"	8:26
4.	"We Access Only a Fraction"	9:00
Total length:		36:50

CD edition track listing
No.	Title	Length
1.	"How to Decode an Illusion"	8:26
2.	"Rendering Intuitions"	6:36
3.	"Human Developers"	12:48
4.	"We Access Only a Fraction"	9:00
5.	"Bestie Infinite"	15:10
Total length:		52:00

== Personnel ==
Credits adapted from liner notes.

- Caterina Barbieri – production
- Antonello Manzo – cello
- Giovanni Brunetto – images
- Angelo Jaroszuk Bogasz – photography
