= C2C Festival =

Pop music festival in Italy

- Genre: Avant-pop
- Date: Late October – early November
- Frequency: Annually
- Location: (Italy) Turin
- Country: Italy
- Years active: 2002–present
- Founders: Sergio Ricciardone; Roberto Spallacci; Giorgio Valletta
- Organiser: Situazione Xplosiva APS
- Website: https://clubtoclub.it/

C2C Festival (also known as Club To Club) is an avant-pop music festival and the largest indoor music festival in Italy. Founded in 2002 by the cultural association Situazione Xplosiva, it takes place annually in Turin between late October and early November, coinciding with the Piedmontese Contemporary Art Week.

The festival has been described by the international press as one of the most important music events in Italy and Europe, while Pitchfork has characterised it as the "ne-plus-ultra of avant-garde eclecticism".

Artists who have performed at the festival including A. G. Cook, Aphex Twin, Arca, Autechre, Beach House, Bicep, Blood Orange, Caribou, Caroline Polachek, Caterina Barbieri, Flying Lotus, Franco Battiato, James Blake, Jamie xx, Junun (ft. Jonny Greenwood, Shye Ben Tzur & The Rajasthan Express), King Krule, Kode9, Kraftwerk, Nicolas Jaar, SOPHIE, Thom Yorke and Yves Tumor.

== History ==
Club To Club was founded in Turin in 2002 by the local cultural association Situazione Xplosiva. The original concept consisted of a network of events across several clubs in the city, allowing access to multiple venues with a single ticket. In 2007, the festival established a central hub at Lingotto Fiere, a complex created from a former FIAT factory, which has since hosted the main nights of the event. Ten years later, OGR Torino (Officine Grandi Riparazioni) was added as an additional venue.

=== 2002–2013 ===
During its early years, the programme focused primarily on DJ sets – featuring artists such as Jeff Mills (2002, 2007, 2011), Tiga (2005), Ricardo Villalobos (2006) and Laurent Garnier (2009). Over time, the festival gradually expanded the number of live performances. Notable events from this period include the performance by Plaid with the Southbank Gamelan Players (2010) and the first Italian show by Flying Lotus (2012). The same period also saw the first Italian appearance by Jamie xx (2010). Starting from 2012 the festival held regular satellites events in London.

=== 2014–2019 ===
In 2014 the festival introduced a two-day format, expanding beyond Lingotto Fiere to include historically and culturally significant venues across the city, such as Teatro Carignano, the Giuseppe Verdi Conservatory and the Reggia of Venaria. From 2017, OGR Torino (Officine Grandi Riparazioni) became a permanent part of the programme. During these years the festival hosted Franco Battiato with the Joe Patti's Experimental Group (2014), a performance by Thom Yorke (2015), and an audiovisual show by Arca and Jesse Kanda (2016). In 2017 Kraftwerk presented their show 3-D The Catalogue 1 2 3 4 5 6 7 8 across eight consecutive concerts. In 2018 Aphex Twin performed at the festival.

=== 2020–2021 ===
Due to the COVID-19 pandemic, the festival was temporarily suspended in its regular in-person format and replaced by 'C0C – The Festival As A Performance', a digital streaming event in 2020, followed by a reduced-format edition in 2021.

=== 2022–present ===
In recent editions, the festival has hosted artists from a wide range of musical scenes and genres, including Arca, A. G. Cook, Autechre, billy woods, Blood Orange, Caroline Polachek, Caterina Barbieri, Dean Blunt, King Krule, Nala Sinephro, Oklou, and Yung Lean & Bladee.

In 2023, the bilingual publication We Call It Avant-Pop was released, documenting the first twenty editions of the festival and its cultural evolution. The book includes contributions by Simon Reynolds, Steve Goodman, Jazz Monroe, Max Dax, Alberto Campo, Carlo Antonelli and Valerio Mattioli.

During the same period, the festival was included for three consecutive editions among the major international music festivals listed by Pitchfork.

In 2025, the first edition of C2C Festival NYC was held at the Knockdown Center in New York City.

Since 2022, the festival has recorded significant growth in attendance, reaching approximately 42,000 participants, with an international audience share of 40% reported in 2025.

== Festival programme ==
Year	Dates	Artists
2002	15 March / 6 December	Alex Neri, Jolly Music, Lele Sacchi, Michael Mayer, Ralph Lawson, Youngsters / Claudio Coccoluto, Ellen Allien, Jeff Mills, FC Kahuna, Marco Passarani, The Dining Rooms, Xplosiva djs
2003	28–29 November	DJ Hell, DJ Patife, Isolée, Maximo Graesse, Mira Aroyo (Ladytron), Pfadfinderei, Stefano Fontana (Stylophonic), Tiga
2004	4–6 November	Agoria, DJ Rolando, Jennifer Cardini, Magda, Alter Ego, Baby Ford, Brooks, Digital, Marcus Nikolai, Santos, Soft Pink Truth, Swayzak
2005	10–12 November	Carl Craig, Jamie Lidell, Luciano, Nathan Fake, Tiga, Drama Society, Ferenc, Freeform Five, Munk, Scuola Furano, WhoMadeWho
2006	9–11 November	Clark, Ellen Allien & Apparat, Murcof, Ricardo Villalobos, Robert Hood, Agoria, Alex Smoke, Alex Under, Carsten Klemann, Cassy, Dani Siciliano, DJ Pete, DJ Rolando, Isan, Minimono, Sebo K, Vincent Lemieux
2007	8–10 November	Digitalism, Jeff Mills, Mika Vainio, Vladislav Delay, William Basinski, Akufen, D-I-R-T-Y Sound System feat. Pilooski, Fovea Hex, Green Velvet, Kalabrese, Larsen, Onur Ozer, Stefan Goldmann, Seph, Tobi Neumann, Troy Pierce, Undo
2008	6–8 November	Benga, Byetone, Ellen Allien, Four Tet, James Holden, Kangding Ray, Luomo, Magda, Skream, Theo Parrish, David Canisius, Federico Molinari, Munk, Pivot, The mole, 2000 and one
2009	5–7 November	Carl Craig + Moritz Von Oswald + Francesco Tristano, Dj Pierre, Dorian Concept, Hudson Mohawke, Jimmy Edgar, Jon Hopkins, Jeff Mills, Laurent Garnier, Marcel Dettmann, Martyn, Nathan Fake, Optimo, Seth Troxler, Shed, Alexander Balanescu, Angel Molina, Blixa Bargeld, Culoe De Song, Filastine, Joe Goddard, Marlene Kuntz, Mustang, Optofonica, Scanner, Steffi, Soap&Skin, The Present, Teho Teardo, The Bloody Beetroots
2010	3–7 November	Actress, Byetone, Caribou, Cassius, Darkstar, Dixon, Factory Floor, Floating Points, Four Tet, Hudson Mohawke, James Holden, Jamie Jones, Jamie xx, Jeff Mills, Joy Orbison, Kate Wax, King Midas Sound, Kode9 [plays Burial], Lory D, Luke Abbott, Marcel Dettmann, Modeselektor, Moritz Von Oswald Trio, Munk, Oneohtrix Point Never, Oni Ayhun, Plaid with Southbank Gamelan Players, Riva Starr, Rob Hall, Scuba, Shackleton, Shed, Spencer, Vaghe Stelle, Walls
2011	3–6 November	Alva Noto + Byetone, Apparat Band, Ben Klock, Caribou, Hype Williams, Jeff Mills, Kode9, Marcel Dettmann, Modeselektor, Theo Parrish, Zomby, Cooly G, Deniz Kurtel, dOP, Egyptrixx, Giorgio Gigli, Giuseppe Ielasi plays Béla Bartók, Holy Other, Jackmaster, Kuedo, Kyle Hall, Lone, Lucy, Martyn, O: Vaghe Stelle + Stargate + A:RA, Pantha Du Prince, Pearson Sound, Planningtorock, Sandwell District: Function & Regis, Space Dimension Controller, Untold
2012	8–11 November	Apparat, Disclosure, Flying Lotus, James Holden, Jeff Mills, Jeff Mills & Claudio Sinatti, Kode9, Marcel Dettmann, Nina Kraviz, SBTRKT, Scuba, Actress, AD Bourke, Christian Löffler, Clark, Clockwork, DJ Tennis, DVA, Evian Christ, Ital, Jam City, John Talabot, Kate Wax, Kuedo, Laurel Halo, Lone, Lorenzo Senni, Mano Le Tough, Margot, Martyn, O / One Circle, Raime, Rampa & David Mayer, Regis, Rustie, Shackleton, Teengirl Fantasy, Vaghe Stelle, Vessel, Young Wonder
2013	7–10 November	Four Tet, Fuck Buttons, James Holden, John Talabot, Modeselektor, Nina Kraviz, Sherwood & Pinch, Andy Stott, Bambounou, Ben UFO, Diamond Version, Dinos Chapman, Dracula Lewis, Factory Floor, The Field, Forest Swords, The Haxan Cloak, Holly Herndon, Kode9, Koreless, Kyle Hall, Lee Gamble, Machinedrum, Niños Du Brasil, Objekt, Rustie
2014	5–9 November	Apparat, Caribou, Franco Battiato / Joe Patti's Experimental Group, SBTRKT, Ben Frost, Chet Faker, Marcel Dettmann, Pantha Du Prince, Talaboman [John Talabot & Axel Boman], Ben UFO & Ron Morelli, Clark, Evian Christ, Fatima & the Eglo Live Band, Fatima Al Qadiri, Future Brown, How To Dress Well, Hyperdub 10.T: Kode9 & Laurel Halo, Jacques Greene, Jessy Lanza, Jungle, Kele [Bloc Party], Kelela, Lorenzo Senni, Luke Vibert, Mark Ernestus & Tikiman, Miles, Millie & Andrea [Miles Whittaker & Andy Stott], Morphosis, Ninos Du Brasil, Primitive Art, Recondite, Stump Valley, Tiger & Woods, Vaghe Stelle, Vessel, Visionist, Gang Of Ducks showcase: Dave Saved, Haf Haf, GOD
2015	4–8 November	Thom Yorke, Battles, Four Tet, Jamie xx, Jeff Mills, Nicolas Jaar, Oneohtrix Point Never, Todd Terje, Apparat, Floating Points, Andy Stott, Anthony Naples, Carter Tutti Void, Dekmantel Soundsystem, Gang Of Ducks Soundsystem, Holly Herndon, Jack Garratt, Kode9, Kuedo, La Priest, Lorenzo Senni, Lotic, Mumdance + Novelist ft. The Square, DJ Nigga Fox, Ninos Du Brasil, Not Waving, Omar Souleyman, Powell, Prurient, Rabit, Shackleton, SOPHIE + QT, Soundwalk Collective, Tala, The Speawl [Mumdance + Logos + Shapednoise], Vaghe Stelle, Apeiron Crew, Bienoise, Demonology, Filosofichestilte, Furtherset, Giorgio Valletta, LSWHR DJs, Simbiosi, Sofia Mattioli & Rebecca Salvadori present Continuum, Stenny, Stump Valley
2016	2–6 November	Arca & Jesse Kanda, Autechre, Daphni, DJ Shadow, Jon Hopkins, Junun feat. Shye Ben Tzur, Jonny Greenwood & The Rajasthan Express, Laurent Garnier, Motor City Drum Ensemble, Nick Murphy (Chet Faker)), Swans, Tim Hecker, Amnesia Scanner, Andy Stott, Anna Von Hausswolff, Arto Lindsay, Chino Amobi, Clams Casino, Elysia Crampton, Evian Christ, Fatima Yamaha, Forest Swords, Gaika, Ghali, Gqom Oh!: Nan Kolè & DJ Lag, Istanbul Sessions, Janus: M.E.S.H, Total Freedom & Kablam, Jessy Lanza, Jolly Mare, Junior Boys, Koreless, Lafawndah, Lorenzo Senni, Mura Masa, Olivia, One Circle, Populous, Powell, RP Boo, Toxe, Warp DJs, XL DJs
2017	1–7 November	Kraftwerk, Nicolas Jaar, Richie Hawtin, Arca & Jesse Kanda, Ben Frost, Bonobo, JUNGLE, Kamasi Washington, Liberato, Mura Masa, Powell & Wolfgang Tillmans, The Black Madonna, Actress, Amnesia Scanner, Bill Kouligas, Dan Denorch — Janus, Demdike Stare, Gabber Eleganza, Helena Hauff, Jacques Greene, Jlin, K Á R Y Y N, Kelly Lee Owens, Lanark Artefax, Laurel Halo, Lorenzo Senni, Mana, Ninos Du Brasil, Nolife, Not Waving, Richard Russell present Everything Is Recorded, Smerz, Shapednoise, STILL, Yves Tumor, Visible Cloaks, Artetetra, Gang Of Ducks: Call To Investigate, Jim C. Nedd & Palm Wine
2018	1–4 November	Aphex Twin, Beach House, Blood Orange, Jamie XX, Avalon Emerson, Call Super, Courtesy, David August, DJ Nigga Fox, Equiknoxx, Iceage, Josey Rebelle, Leon Vynehall, Obongjayar, Peggy Gou, Robin Fox presents Single Origin, serpentwithfeet, Skee Mask, Tirzah, Vessel, Yves Tumor, Diggin' In The Carts: Kode9 x Kōji Morimoto, Yuzo Koshiro & Motohiro Kawashima, DITC 音 & visuals by Konx-Om-Pax, Bienoise, Elena Colombi, Gang Of Ducks, Mana, Palm Wine, Primitive Art & Silvia Kastel
2020	Did not take place	The festival was temporarily suspended in its usual in-person format due to the pandemic and replaced by a digital event called 'C0C — The Festival As A Performance', featuring Artetetra X Suoni d'Artista, Bienoise X Allarme Rosso, Lorenzo Senni & Daniel Sansavini, Caterina Barbieri & Ruben Spini, Mana & Nicole Neider: Mania, Ninos Du Brasil: All Work And No Play Make NDB Dull Boys, SPIME.IM present ZERO
2021	4–7 November	A special event was hosted, called 'C0C — The Festival As A Performance' with con Beatrice Dillon, Bill Kouligas, Caterina Barbieri, DJ Nigga Fox, Francesco Cavaliere, Kelman Duran, Koreless, L'Rain, Mana, Ripatti, Sabla, Sara Berts, Skee Mask, Space Afrika, Tirzah, Tomat, XIII, Stefania Vos, Suoni D'Artista: Artetetra, We Call It Avant-Pop: Nationhood
2019	30 October – 3 November	Chromatics, Flume, James Blake, Battles, black midi, The Comet Is Coming, Floating Points, Helado Negro, Holly Herndon: PROTO, Kelsey Lu, Nu Guinea, Romy, Skee Mask, slowthai, SOPHIE, Desire, Issam, Kode9, Let's Eat Grandma, Mormor, Napoli Segreta, Nivhek, RAP, Samà, Slikback, Spencer D [Kankyō Ongaku: Japanese Ambient, Environmental & New Age Music 1980-1990], Visible Cloaks, Yoshio Ojima & Satsuki Shibano, 72-HOUR POST FIGHT, Blinky, Haunter Records [Heith & Sense Fracture], Jackie — Hundebiss, Mana, SPIME.IM, Spiritual Sauna [Rapala700 & Virginia W], Stump Valley
2022	3–6 November	Arca, Autechre, Low (sostituiti da Jeff Mills per motivi di salute), Aya, Bicep, Bill Kouligas, Blackhaine, Caribou, Caterina Barbieri, Elena Colombi, Jamie xx, Jockstrap, Kode9, Lyra Pramuk, Makaya McCraven, Pa Salieu, Romy, Two Shell, Yendry, 72-HOUR POST FIGHT, Gang Of Ducks X C2C Festival with Hans Arsen & Reptilian Expo, Mana & Pedro Vian, Sabla & Đ.K., Stenny & Ehua, XIII & Selezione Naturale, Nu Genea curate Bar Mediterraneo with Deena Abdelwahed, DJ Plead, My Analog Journal, Nu Genea, Renato Leotta: Ondina
2023	2–5 November	Avalon Emerson & The Charm, Caroline Polachek, Evian Christ, Flying Lotus, Hagop Tchaparian, King Krule, Lucrecia Dalt, Marina Herlop, Model/Actriz, Moodymann, Nick León, Overmono, Rachika Nayar, Slauson Malone 1, Space Afrika, Two Shell, Yves Tumor, BLTNM showcase with Shabjdeed Al Nather, Daboor & Mouri, PAN 15 with Bambii, Bill Kouligas, Crystalmess, Honour, Sangre Nueva [DJ Python, Florentino & Kelman Duran] and Tzusing, G of D 10 with Azu Tiwaline & Cinna Peyghamy, Francesca Heart & Regno Maggiore, Gang Of Ducks Soundsystem and upsammy & Jonathan Castro
2024	31 October – 3 November	A.G. Cook, Amaliah, Arca, Ben Ufo, Bicep present Chroma, billy woods, DARKSIDE, Dean Blunt, Delroy Edwards, Evilgiane, Gabber Eleganza B2B Bill Kouligas, John Glacier, John T. Gast, John Talabot, Kali Malone, Kode9, Mabe Fratti, MACE: Voodoo People, Mandy Indiana, Mica Levi, Miss Jay, Nala Sinephro, Olof Dreijer, Pangaea, Pearson Sound, Romy, Sega Bodega, Shabaka, Snow Strippers, Sofia Kourtesis, Verraco, XIII B2B SABLA, Yaeji
2025	30 October – 2 November	A. G. Cook (live), Ali Sethi & Nicolas Jaar, Annahstasia, Barker, Billy Woods, Blawan (live), Blood Orange, Daniel Blumberg, DJ Python, DjRUM, Ecco2K, Floating Points (DJ), Florence Sinclair, Four Tet, IOSONOUNCANE & Daniela Pes, Isabella Lovestory, Jenny Hval, John Maus, Kelman Duran, Los Thuthanaka, Malibu, Maria Somerville, Mechatok, Model/Actriz, Nourished by Time, Saya Gray, Skee Mask, Smerz, Titanic (I. La Catolica & Mabe Fratti), TRESCA Y TIGRE & LECHUGA ZAFIRO, YHWH Nailgun, XIII & Sabla
2026	29 October – 1 November	Arca, BadBadNotGood, Chanel Beads, Chuquimamani-Condori presents Dj E, Crystallmess, Joanne Robertson, Kelela, Kmru, Oklou, Robyn, Theo Parrish, underscores, Yung Lean & Bladee
