= Anatomy of Distort =

Studio album by Hwyl Nofio
- Released: July 2005
- Recorded: February–November 2004
- Genres: Experimental, avant-garde
- Label: HWYL
- Producer: Steve Parry

Hwyl Nofio chronology
Hymnal (2002)	Anatomy of Distort (2005)	Hounded by Fury (2006)

Professional ratings
Review scores
Source	Rating
Maelstrom	(8/10)

Anatomy of Distort is an album by Hwyl Nofio.

== Track listing ==
1. "The Life and Death of Joseph Merrick"
2. "Red Herald"
3. "I Love You But I Don’t Like You"
4. "The Wern"
5. " The Face of a Social Butterfly”
6. "Murder in the Cathedral”
7. "The End"

== Personnel ==
- Steve Parry: guitar, prepared piano, tapes, keyboards, percussion, ebow, church organ, effects, Harmonium, Cello
- Mark Powell: Saxophone (track 1)
- The Oedipus Ensemble (Strings)
