= The Singers and Harp Players Are Dumb =

Studio album by Hwyl Nofio
- Released: September 1999
- Recorded: January – August 1998
- Genre: Experimental, avant-garde
- Label: HWYL
- Producer: Steve Parry, Trevor Stainsby

Hwyl Nofio chronology
The Singers and Harp Players Are Dumb (1999)	Hymnal (2002)

Professional ratings
Review scores
Source	Rating
Maelstrom	(8/10)

The Singers and Harp Players Are Dumb is the debut album of Hwyl Nofio.

== Track listing ==
1. "Black River" – 3:03
2. "Jerusalem Lane" – 7:58
3. "Luminous Is An Autumn Sunset" – 6:26
4. "Gravitate To The Green Hut" – 10:24
5. "The Song Tide Wanes And Goes" – 5:06
6. "Angel Tits" – 5:47
7. "The Singers And Harp Players Are Dumb" – 6:31
8. "The Somnambulist" – 5:30
9. "Glass Floor No Door" – 2:55

The album contains an untitled track at the end

== Personnel ==
- Steve Parry – prepared piano, piano, keyboards, sound inputs, church organ, guitars, e-bow, effects, electric drill, white noise
- Trevor Stainsby – effects (1, 3), programming (6, 7), drum programming (9)
- Sandor Szabo – ambimorph guitar (3)
- Fredrik Søegaard – acoustic guitar (6)
- Balazs Major – drums (6), percussion (6, 8)
- The Celestial Male Voice Choir – voices (7)
