= Some Bizzare Album =

Compilation album by various artists
- Released: January 1981
- Genres: Synth-pop; new wave
- Label: Some Bizzare

Various artists chronology
Some Bizzare Album (1981)	If You Can't Please Yourself, You Can't Please Your Soul (1985)

Some Bizzare Album is the first compilation album issued by Some Bizzare Records. It was released in January 1981 as a sampler of the label's musical ethos. The acts were not signed exclusively to the label at the time.

== Information ==
The album consisted of tracks by unsigned synth-pop groups, including future alternative icons Depeche Mode, Soft Cell, the The and Blancmange. Depeche Mode's contribution was their first recording to be released. Some Bizzare Album was the vision of Stevo Pearce, who believed in the album's music as opposed to fashion or style aspects. Some Bizzare Album was re-released on CD format in 1992 for a limited time. It was re-released in 2008 with extra bonus tracks.

=== Soft Cell – "The Girl with the Patent Leather Face" ===
After meeting with Pearce, Soft Cell decided to include a track on the album. They recorded "The Girl with the Patent Leather Face" at a studio owned by John Darling. Almond describes the song as a "tinny-sounding, trashy synthesizer song" that owed much to "Warm Leatherette", a track by the Normal.

=== Depeche Mode – "Photographic" ===
Formed in 1980, Depeche Mode were cautious when first approached by Pearce, as they were indecisive about being included on a "futurist" compilation album. They first brought their demo tape to other record companies but were rejected. In late 1980, Depeche Mode recorded "Photographic" in John Bassett's Forest Gate studio. Daniel Miller of Mute Records, who acted as an informal producer during the recording, wanted to place a good track on the compilation album, but not the band's best. The track was recorded and mixed in one day.

The song, which differs from the version later found on Speak & Spell, was later included in the 1998 reissue of The Singles 81→85 as a bonus track.

=== Neu Electrikk – "Lust of Berlin" ===
London-based Neu Electrikk comprised singer songwriter Derek Morris, guitarist and electronics Steve Parry, bass player Nicholas Chamberlain Hunt, sax/flute/treatments Steve Sherlock and Barry Deller on drums/percussion. Neu Electrikk released two single/EPs on the Synethesia label: "Lust of Berlin"/"Distractions" (1979) and "Cover Girl"/"Practically Isolate"/"Hand"/"Converse of Tapes" (1980). Pearce discovered the band in an advert in Sounds magazine and contacted them through their distributor, Rough Trade Records. Pearce convinced Parry to contribute to the album by claiming that Pearce managed The The. The version of "Lust of Berlin" on the Some Bizzare Album was recorded at ARK Studios, Kingston upon Thames.

=== The The – "Untitled" ===
The The's contribution was recorded at SGS Recording Studio in South London and was originally titled "Strawberry Sunset." Steve Parry suggested the studio to Matt Johnson after having previously recorded there with Neu Electrikk. The recording was complicated by an uncooperative studio engineer who did not appreciate the music. The master tape was given to Parry and remained in his possession until Pearce asked the The to contribute a track to the Some Bizzare Album.

=== Illustration – "Tidal Flow" ===
Illustration was formed in 1979 by Tony Harrison (vocals) and Timm Johnson (guitar). They were joined by Paul Lancaster (Bass) George Terry AKA Morgan King (drums) and Andy Prasher (keyboards) who was soon replaced by Julia Adamson. Together they made various demos for record companies and agreed to release one of these songs, "Tidal Flow" onto the Some Bizzare Album which was engineered, mixed and produced by Phil Ault at Revolution Studios, Stockport. Though Illustration toured to promote the album with the other bands and made a follow-up record "Dancable" with the legendary producer Martin Hannett at Strawberry Studios, Stockport, it was never officially released as they broke up in 1981.

== Reception ==
Professional ratings
Review scores
Source	Rating
Allmusic	4/5 stars

== Track listing ==
Fish side

1. Illustration - "Tidal Flow"
2. Depeche Mode – "Photographic"
3. The The – "Untitled"
4. B-Movie – "Moles"
5. Jell – "I Dare Say It Will Hurt a Little"
6. Blah Blah Blah – "Central Park"

Eye Lamp side

1. Blancmange – "Sad Day"
2. Soft Cell – "The Girl with the Patent Leather Face"
3. Neu Electrikk – "Lust of Berlin"
4. Naked Lunch – "La Femme"
5. The Fast Set – "King of the Rumbling Spires"
6. The Loved One – "Observations"

The 1981 cassette edition positioned the "Eye Lamp" side of the album as Side 1, with the "Fish" side as Side 2, but the 1992 CD edition features "Fish" on Side 1 and "Eye Lamp" on Side 2.

2008 CD reissue bonus tracks

1. The Normal – "Warm Leatherette"
2. Fad Gadget – "Back to Nature"
3. The Residents – "The Act of Being Polite"

== Personnel ==
- Stevo Pearce – Compiler
- Steve Bush – Designer
