= Stevo Pearce =

Stephen John Pearce
- Also known as: Stevo
- Born: Stephen John Pearce; 26 December 1962 (age 63); Dagenham, Essex, England
- Occupations: Record producer; music industry executive
- Label: Some Bizzare
- Website: Some Bizzare Records

Stephen John Pearce, commonly known as Stevo (born 26 December 1962), is a British record producer and music industry executive, best known as the owner of indie record label Some Bizzare Records.

== Biography ==
He was born in Haverhill, Suffolk. He left school at sixteen with no qualifications and entered a work training placement with subcontracted distribution company distributing Phonogram Records. His mother purchased a mobile disco unit on hire purchase and Stevo began a Monday-night residency at the Chelsea Drugstore in London's King's Road. Around this time he was banned from playing certain clubs due to his eccentricities. He was chased out of one club for just repeating "Yes hello, hello yes, it's highly psychological", and after mixing Mickey Mouse into Cabaret Voltaire at half speed. Other things that the public were not used to included playing six different records at the same time, causing a very intense sound.

After the residency at the Drugstore, Stevo moved on to working a regular night at the Clarendon Hotel, Hammersmith. The nights at the Clarendon were known as "Stevo's Electro Tunes" where bands like DAF, Fad Gadget, Last Dance, Naked Lunch and Boyd Rice played. At this time Stevo regarded himself as a music anarchist in the music scene and felt it important for musical barriers to be broken down. After these nights attracted interest Stevo was asked to compile an electronic music chart in the Record Mirror, soon followed by his "Futurist Chart" in Sounds. He did not like the term "Futurist", feeling the name was "a bit of a joke". The Sounds chart was filled with demos that were sent to him by new unknown bands.

In 1980, after realising he was receiving some good material, he decided to put together a compilation album, the Some Bizzare Album.

Stevo went on to sign some of the most important underground, alternative bands of the 1980s, becoming notorious in the way he signed bands, especially with major record labels who knew how important the deal was to them. Eccentric record contract signings included Test Department's deal, which was signed on a rocking-horse named Horace. Stevo also was sent sweets every week as part of a deal with Phonogram Records. There is also the story of a teddy bear sent to a meeting, to clinch the deal for Soft Cell. The teddy was appropriately dressed as Robin Hood.

== Associated artists ==
Stevo Pearce has been involved with many artists and bands as their manager or through his label Some Bizzare Records.

=== Soft Cell ===
The Warehouse Leeds, Yorkshire, was where Soft Cell first had a meeting with Stevo, who had hitch-hiked to Leeds from London, picked up at Staples Corner by the band Modern English as he was holding a sign saying "Leeds". Marc Almond was impressed with Stevo, who, he is quoted as saying, "had the gift of the gab" and was "immensely likeable". Stevo said that he was putting together the Some Bizzare Album, which would include bands that "broke down barriers". He preferred to include undiscovered bands that he could then license to major record companies through his Some Bizzare label. Stevo wanted to include Soft Cell on the Some Bizzare Album, and also wanted to manage the band.

After returning to his home in Leeds, Almond discussed the meeting with bandmate Dave Ball and sought advice from Tony Mayo (of Naked Lunch), who would also appear on the Some Bizzare album. They decided that working with Stevo is what they wanted. Stevo was only 17 at the time.

=== Depeche Mode ===
Depeche Mode were cautious when first approached by Stevo: they were indecisive about being included on a "Futurist" compilation album. They first decided to take their demo tape to various other record companies, only to be rejected by everyone. After a bad first meeting with Daniel Miller of Mute Records (Miller was in a bad mood due to a problem with some Fad Gadget artwork) the door was left open for Stevo to include Depeche Mode on his Some Bizzare Album. During an evening at the Bridgehouse, in Canning Town, Stevo chatted with Depeche Mode about his new label and compilation album; the band had been supporting Fad Gadget. It was decided that Depeche Mode would record a track for the Some Bizzare Album. Stevo had then recommended that the band work with Daniel Miller at Mute Records. In 1980, Depeche Mode went into an east London recording studio and recorded the track "Photographic". Daniel Miller wanted to put a good track on the compilation album, but not their best track. Miller acted as informal producer on the recording of the Some Bizzare version of the "Photographic" track. The band set up their equipment in the studio and ran through some of their tracks live in the studio. "Photographic" was recorded and mixed in one day.

=== The The ===
Matt Johnson, of the band The The, first came across Stevo after receiving a series of odd phone calls wanting him to support the band, Cabaret Voltaire. Johnson was being offered to support the band in Retford, Nottingham. At first he declined due to there being no payment; Stevo insisted it would be good for Johnson's career. In the end Johnson agreed and travelled up to Sheffield in Tony Mayo's (Naked Lunch) old Ford Transit van, along with Stevo, Keith Laws, Tom Johnston, Peter Ashworth (who comprised the band at that time) and Naked Lunch, who were the main support band. The whole concert turned out to be a good experience for Johnson who, afterwards, continued to work with Stevo. Johnson and Laws recorded an untitled track for the Some Bizzare Album. Stevo became Matt Johnson's manager in around 1982 and began looking to sign The The to a major record label.

After the success of Soft Cell, in particular, Stevo began to have immense clout with the major record companies. Johnson and Laws had released the single "Cold Spell Ahead" on the independent side of Some Bizarre but later Stevo dealt with Decca Records, who paid for Johnson to re-record the song with producer Mike Thorne in New York. Stevo had managed to get Decca to pay for the recordings while still keeping ownership of the recordings. This was a good example of how Stevo dealt with the large major recording companies at the time. After Johnson had completed the recordings Stevo began dealing with both Decca and CBS for a record deal. The deal famously went to CBS with a bizarre contract signing in Trafalgar Square.

== Bibliography ==
- Malins, Steve (1999). Depeche Mode – A Biography. Andre Deutsch Ltd. ISBN 0-233-99425-4.
- Neal, Charles, ed. (1987). Tape Delay: Confessions from the Eighties Underground. SAF Publishing Ltd. ISBN 978-0-946719-02-0 – via the Internet Archive.
