= Steve Parry (musician) =

- Also known as: Stefan Jadd
- Born: 1958 (age 67–68); Pontypool, Wales
- Genres: Experimental, industrial, avant-garde, drone
- Instruments: Guitar, piano
- Website: Hwyl Nofio

Stephen John Parry (born 4 September 1958, in Pontypool), is a Welsh guitarist and composer who was a founder member of the experimental rock band Hwyl nofio.

He founded and played with Neu Electrikk. He has recorded with Colin Potter of Nurse with Wound and played with Matt Johnson of the post punk band The The.

== Early days ==
Parry started learning guitar around the age of eight and later studied piano. Parry's mother Anne was a church organist at the local St Mary's Church, Panteg. He often accompanied his Mother to church and sat by her side as she played. The constant drone and mechanism of the church organ fascinated the young boy. Parry is a product of the South Wales Valleys; formative years were spent living in the shadow of The Black Mountains, amid the scars and ruins of a heavily industrial landscape. Both his grandfathers had worked in local industries, coal mines and steel works. Parry previously had recalled the memory of a school trip to a local steelworks, experiencing intense heat, tasting toxic gasses, seeing rivers of molten metal and the sound of industrial hammers. Parry's compositions frequently refer to the catharsis of childhood and influence of environment, expressly hymnal facets of his work in the experimental music ensemble Hwyl Nofio. The Hwyl Nofio, abstract, noise composition 'From Elevated Gangways Rivers of Molten Metal Flow' referred to the above-mentioned childhood experience.

== Parry's music ==
Parry's first guitar was a classical acoustic, nylon stringed model that mistakenly had been strung with steel strings. The steel strings effectively warped the guitar neck, rendering the guitar virtually unplayable and impossible to tune. In his attempts to learn to play the instrument Parry developed a method for making sounds and noises. Abandoning conventional theory and on discovering the music of American avant-garde composer, philosopher John Cage Parry became less interested in the standard use of the guitar. Parry's music is generally described as experimental music whereby he explores and exploits an ongoing collision between harmony and disharmony. The music can be challenging to the listener. Parry has developed a non-standard guitar technique and made use of prepared guitar (e.g. putting a nail file and screws on the strings, playing the guitar with pliers or a dinner fork) the key features being unconventional tunings, timbres, drone, distortion and noise. Parry often treats the guitar purely as a sound source rather than a musical instrument. He has developed a stringed musical instrument essentially based on the violin which is further linked to a series of effects pedals.

== London years ==
In 1977 Parry moved to Croydon, South London. He replied to an advertisement placed in the NME by Matt Johnson looking for musicians to form a band. Parry did not join Johnson in the fledgling The The, however Johnson and Parry would keep in contact and share music industry information and personal contacts. Parry would later help with the recording of 'Untitled' by The The as featured on the Some Bizzare Album and performed live with The The at the 'Anarchists Ball' at The Metropolitan Wharf Warehouse, Wapping, London E1.

== Neu Electrikk ==
In early 1978, he co-founded Neu Electrikk with Steve Sherlock and Derek Morris, later recruiting Nick Hunt and Barry Deller to complete the line-up. Having signed to Some Bizzare Records the band split in 1981 following internal conflict within the group. Steve Sherlock would later record with The The and joined Marc Almond in Marc and the Mambas.

== HWYL ==
In 1986, Parry established the music label HWYL. HWYL are a Yorkshire based multimedia publishing company. They also are a UK-based music publisher, with such composers as Belgium guitarist, composer Gilbert Isbin, Hungarian guitar artist, improviser, composer Sándor Szabó and Danish fractal guitarist Fredrik Soegaard on their roster. Parry had been interested in the concept of atmospheric music. He created HWYL to promote and release original instrumental music from an eclectic idiom employing classical, primitive, jazz, folk, minimalism, contemporary to developing systems for producing sound. Parry perceived the creative and compositional template of HWYL to be limitless. The principal objective for HWYL was to establish an artist owned label, where the music was of primary importance, defined by the artist, irrespective of commercial gain.

== Hwyl Nofio ==
In 1997, Parry founded the avant-garde, multimedia group Hwyl Nofio. Parry remaining the only permanent member of the group.

== Selective recordings ==
- Hwyl Nofio – The Singers And Harp Players Are Dumb
- Hwyl Nofio – Hymnal
- Hwyl Nofio – Hounded by Fury
- Hwyl Nofio – Anatomy of Distort
- Parry/Soegaard – Off the Map
- Neu Electrikk – Cover Girl/Practically Isolate/Converse of Tapes/Hand
- Trevor Stainsby – The Rhythm of Return
- Colin Potter- The Where House
- Steve Parry – Womb

== Other ==
He is a Bachelor of Science (BSc) in Psychology, Open University, England 1999–2003. He has worked with people with learning disabilities and is interested in Music cognition, the influence of sound on the brain and cognitive theories of how people understand music.
