= Hymnal (Hwyl Nofio album) =

Studio album by Hwyl Nofio
- Released: September 2002
- Recorded: October 2001 – March 2002
- Genre: Experimental, avant-garde
- Label: HWYL
- Producer: Steve Parry

Hwyl Nofio chronology
The Singers And Harp Players Are Dumb (1999)	Hymnal (2002)	Anatomy of Distort (2005)

Professional ratings
Review scores
Source	Rating
BBC	(8/10)

Hymnal is an album by Hwyl Nofio.

== Track listing ==
1. "A brutality of fact"
2. "All you knew were doomed"
3. "Children are"
4. "Spirits"
5. "Disciples of the decibel (part 1)"
6. "Head Eater"
7. "Hymnal"
8. "Holy Ghosts"

== Personnel ==
- Steve Parry: guitar, prepared piano, tapes, keyboards, percussion, ebow, church organ, effects, harmonium, cello
- Trevor Stainsby: effects, programming, mix
- Fredrik Soegaard: fractal guitar
- Sandor Szabo: ambimorph guitar
- Balazs Major: percussion, drums
- Mark Beazley: from the band Rothko): bass
- Tim Crawley: prepared piano
- The Jerusalem Brass Band: brass
