= Naked Lunch (British band) =

English band

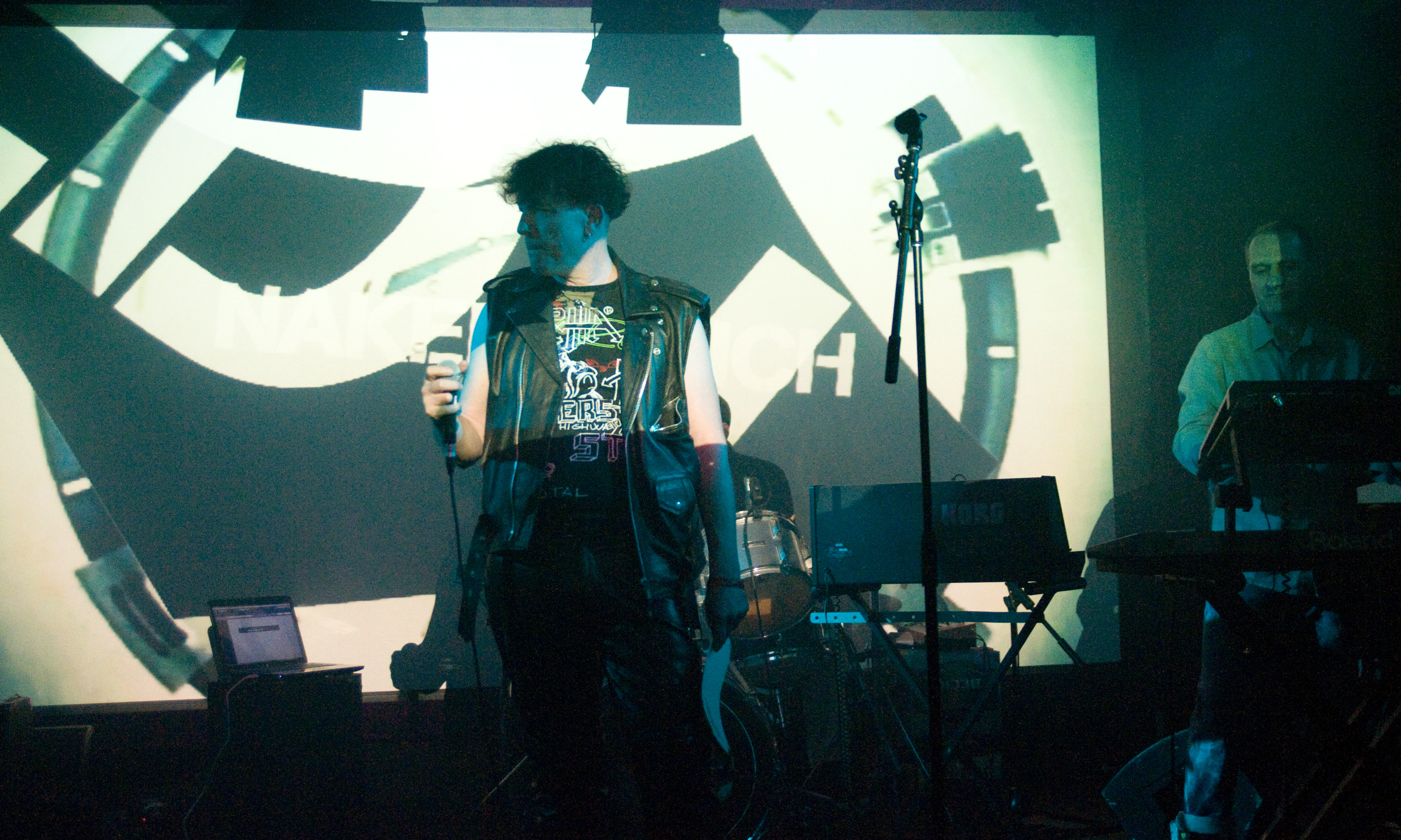
- Naked Lunch Performing at Reproducktion 13 – May 2013

Background information
- Origin: England
- Genres: Pop music
- Labels: Some Bizzare Records; Ramkup Records; EMI; Sub Culture Records; Plezure Records; Strut Records
- Members: Tony Mayo
- Website: nakedlunch.org.uk

Naked Lunch are an English pop band formed in 1979, by Tony Mayo (aka Anthony Malpass) who advertised for like-minded people in the Melody Maker. Mick Clarke replied and they then moved into a flat to work on further material. In preparation to play live further members were advertised for and Tim Yorke, Paul Nicholas Davies and Cliff Chapman joined and then, in 1981, by Mark Irving who replaced Yorke.

The band was one of the first synth based groups, and as such were featured on the Some Bizzare Album alongside Depeche Mode, Soft Cell, Blancmange and The The. Tony Mayo, the lead singer with the band, had close connections with Stevo Pearce and aided with pulling the artists for this album together. Naked Lunch also recorded at Abbey Road recording studios for EMI and the track "Horrow Shock Horror" was released on the EMI compilation Silly Not to Terpsichore. Subsequently, the band's were featured on the London Weekend Television program 20th Century Box, and during the making of this program, Tony Mayo bought the attention of the program makers of Depeche Mode, who were then featured on the program and was part of their rise to fame. The Depeche Mode biography Stripped, makes several references to Naked Lunch and explained how they had been around since the early days of the UK electronic music movement and had paved the way for other bands such as Depeche Mode.

A brief history of the band includes the fact that as early as 1979 they performed in a show alongside the likes of Deutsch Amerikanische Freundschaft, Cabaret Voltaire, Fad Gadget, B-Movie and Clock DVA organised by the band and Stevo Pearce (who managed Some Bizzare Records), who Tony had DJed with previously. The band undertook the Naked Lunch's Electronic Indoctrination Tour in 1980 which included a show at Leeds Futurama, which was filmed and eventually broadcast on BBC2. Naked Lunch then set about helping Pearce find artists and recordings to make up the Some Bizzare Album to which the band itself contributed "La Femme" (a song originally called "Le Femme" but Phonogram who released the album was licensed to change it to grammatically correct French, missing the point of the androgyny of the electronic music scene and that the song was about that). After a parting with Pearce, Naked Lunch became managed by Ramkup with the single "Rabies" backed by "Slipping Again" being released, though it suffered from a ban on daytime radio play due to the title but did receive good play and support from the likes of John Peel and Nicky Horne on their nighttime shows. Line-up changes continued before the band split in 1981 with Mayo retaining the name Naked Lunch, which he registered with Companies House in May 1981. A second version of the band emerged as a live act until 1985 and though Mayo continued with Naked Lunch projects, the band as such was a quiet presence.

2010 saw Tony Mayo link up again with early member Paul Davies and writing new material, with Mick Clark and Cliff Chapman joining in 2011, both in the original line-up. Their first gig for over 30 years came at BAS II with the addition of Mark Irving coming in early 2012 and Anastasia Coburg linking up in June 2013. During 2013, Naked Lunch appeared at the Roundhouse in London, the Dark Waters Alternative Music festival (both of which had positive reviews) and also headlined at the Slimelight Club in London. The band has been recording new material and have released their first album Beyond Planets in 2014 after signing with Sub Culture Records for digital distribution, Deadfall management and Dark Independent bookings.

== Band members ==
=== Members (1979-1981) ===
- Tony Mayo - vocals
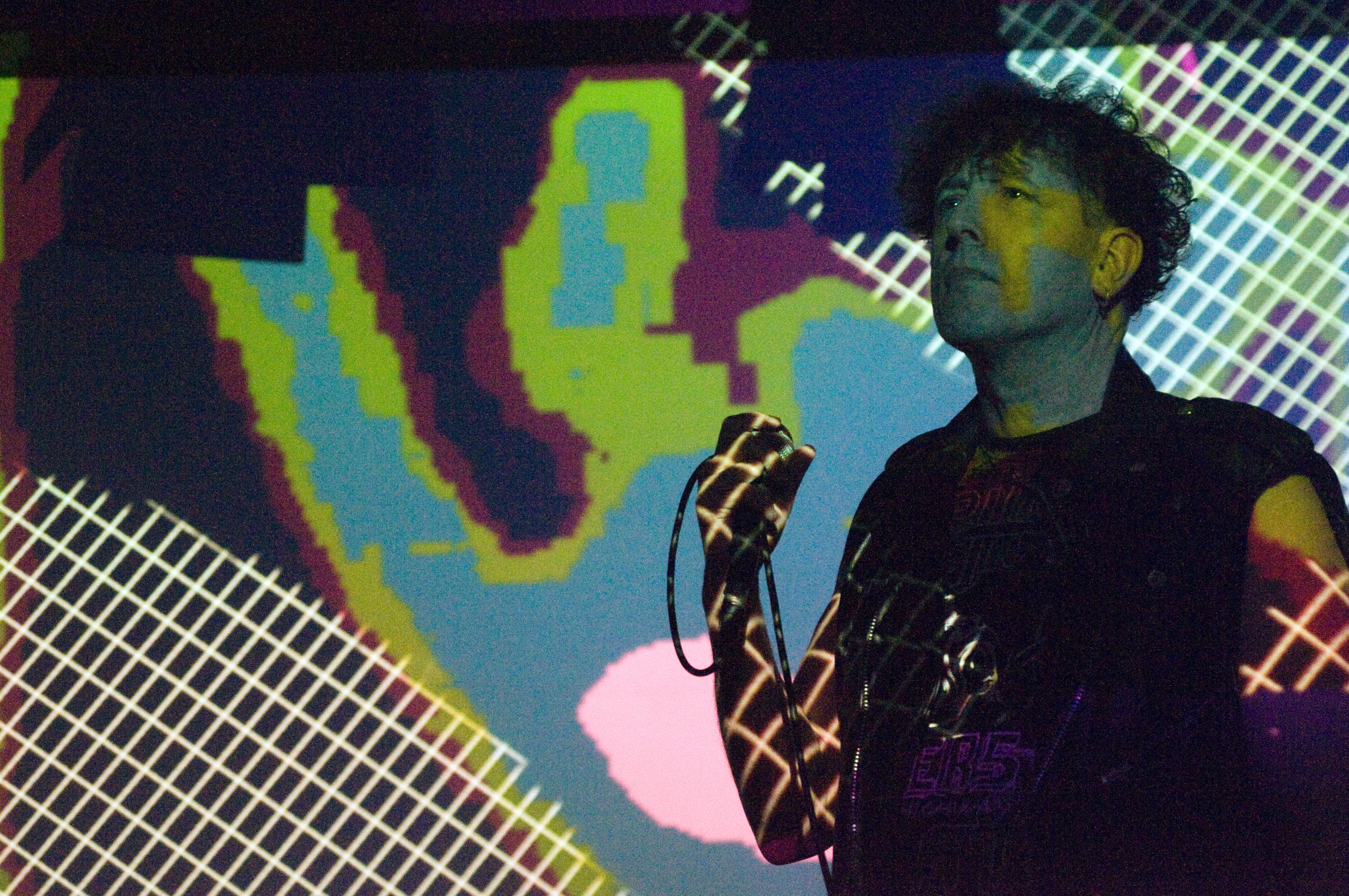
  Naked Lunch – Tony Performing at Reproducktion 13 – May 2013
- Mick Clarke - synthesizer
- Cliff Chapman - synthesizer
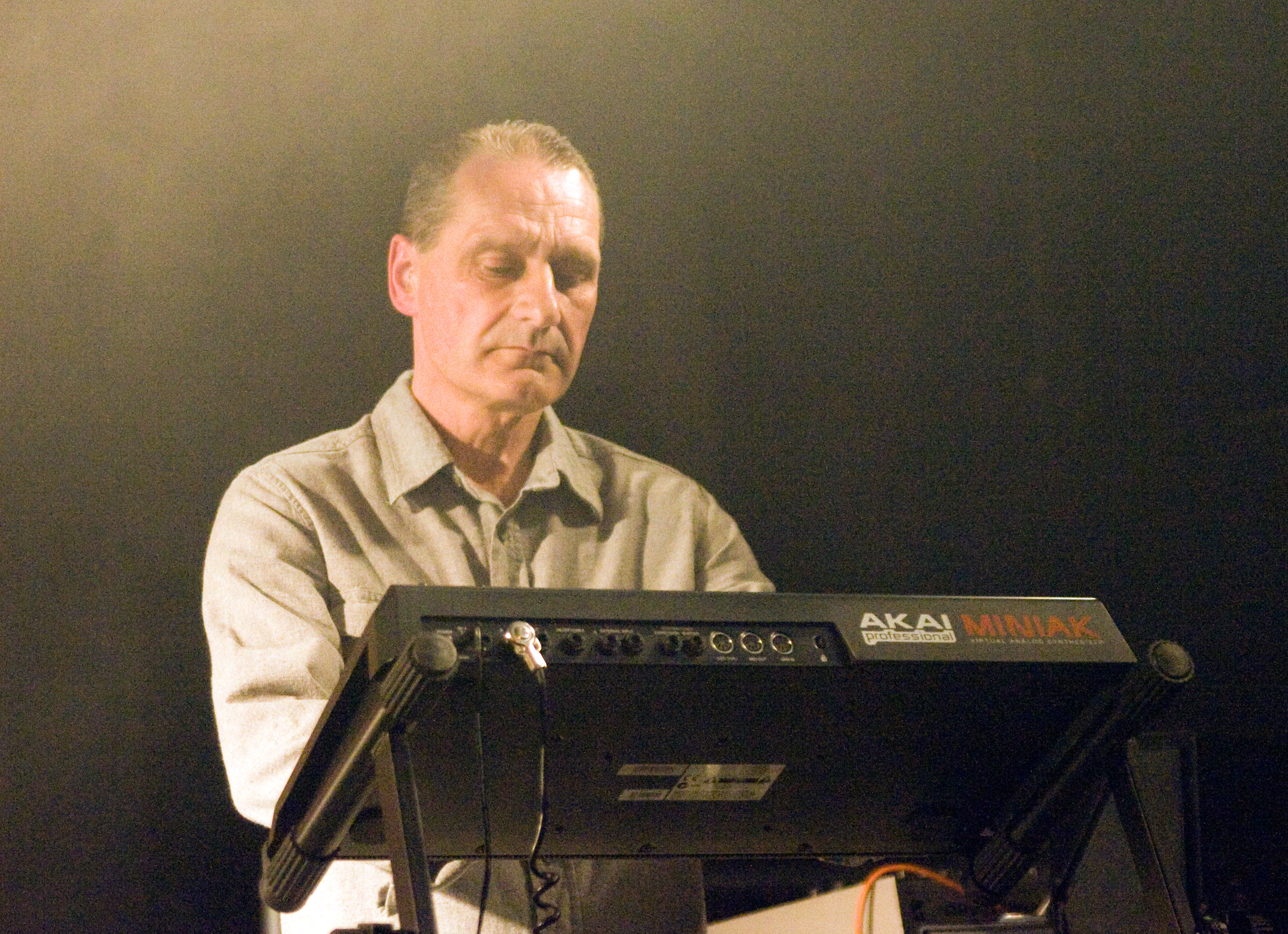
  Naked Lunch – Cliff at Round House 2013
- Paul N. Davies - guitar
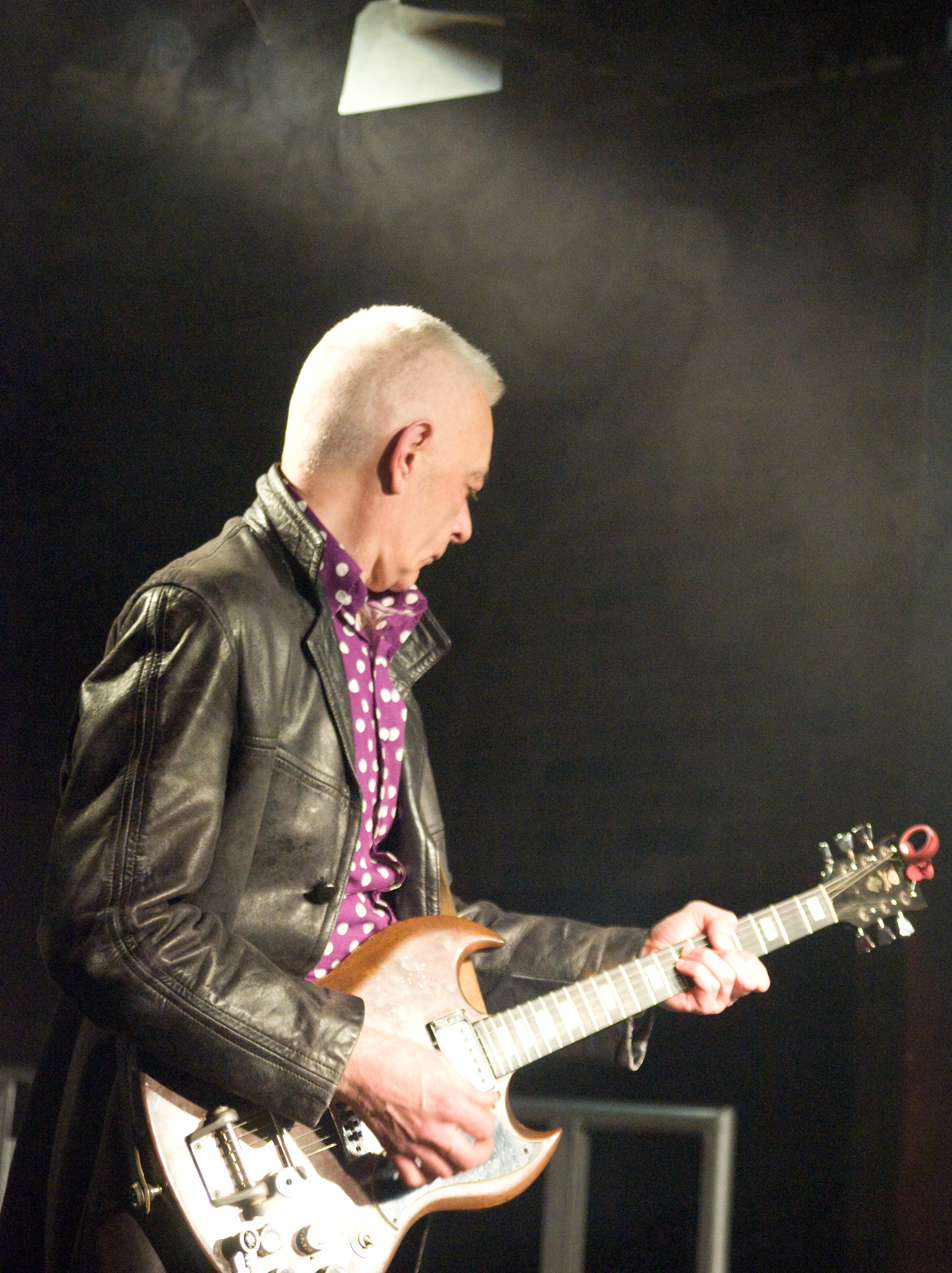
  Naked Lunch – Paul at Round House 2013
- Mark Irving - drums
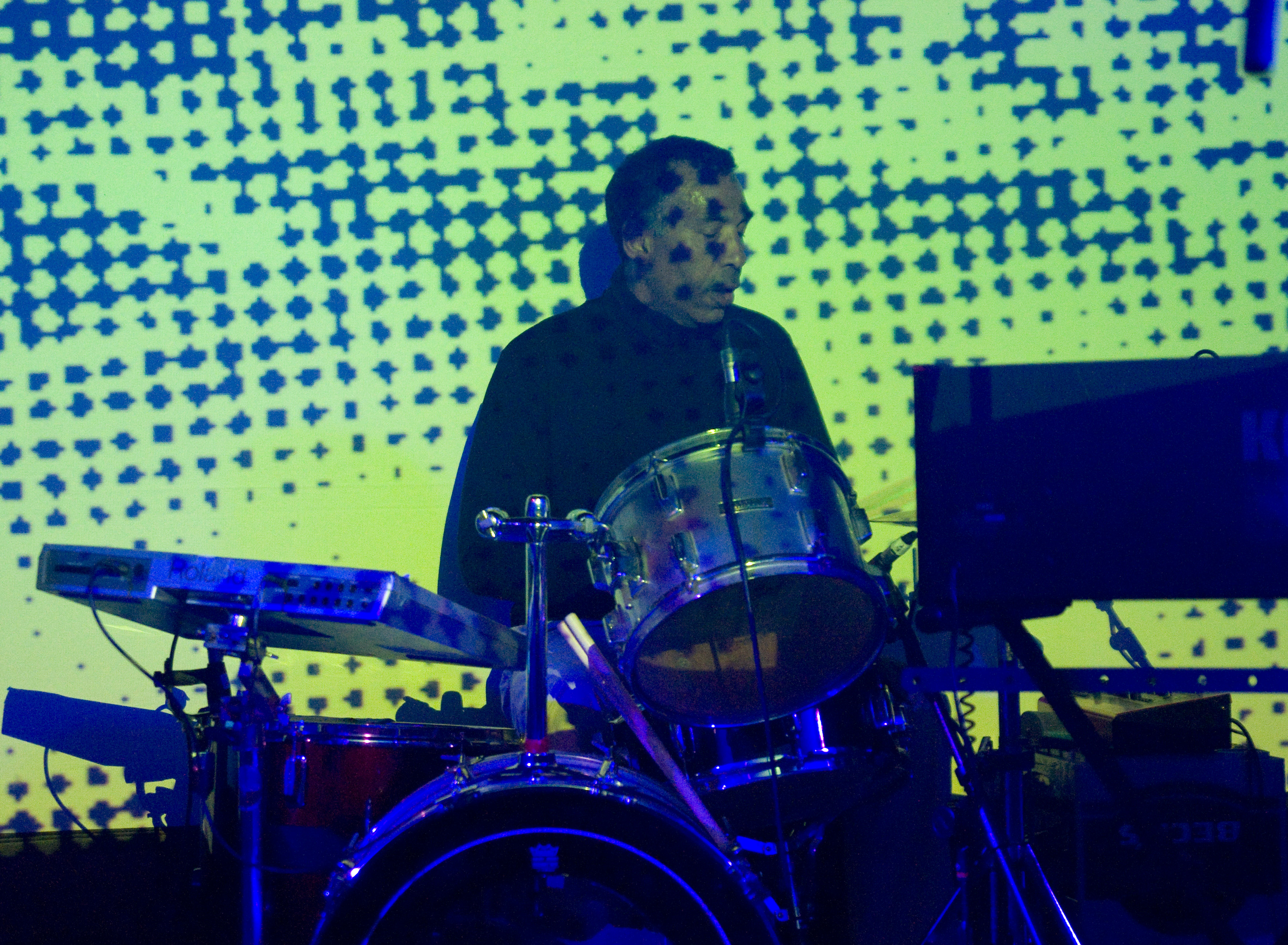
  Naked Lunch – Mark at Round House 2013

=== Members (1982-1985) ===
- Tony Mayo - vocals
- Paul Loughnane - guitar and synthesizer
- Nick O'Brian - bass and synth
- Tim Yorke - drums

=== Members (1985-1997) ===
- Tony Mayo - vocals
- Sali-ann - backing vocals
- Paul Loughnane - guitar and synthesiser

=== Members (2010-2013) ===
- Tony Mayo - vocals
- Mick Clarke - synthesizer
- Cliff Chapman - synthesizer
- Paul N. Davies - guitar
- Mark Irving - drums

=== Members (2013–2014) ===
- Tony Mayo - vocals
- Cliff Chapman - synthesizer
- Paul N. Davies - guitar
- Mark Irving - drums
- Jet Noir - synthesizer, backing vocals
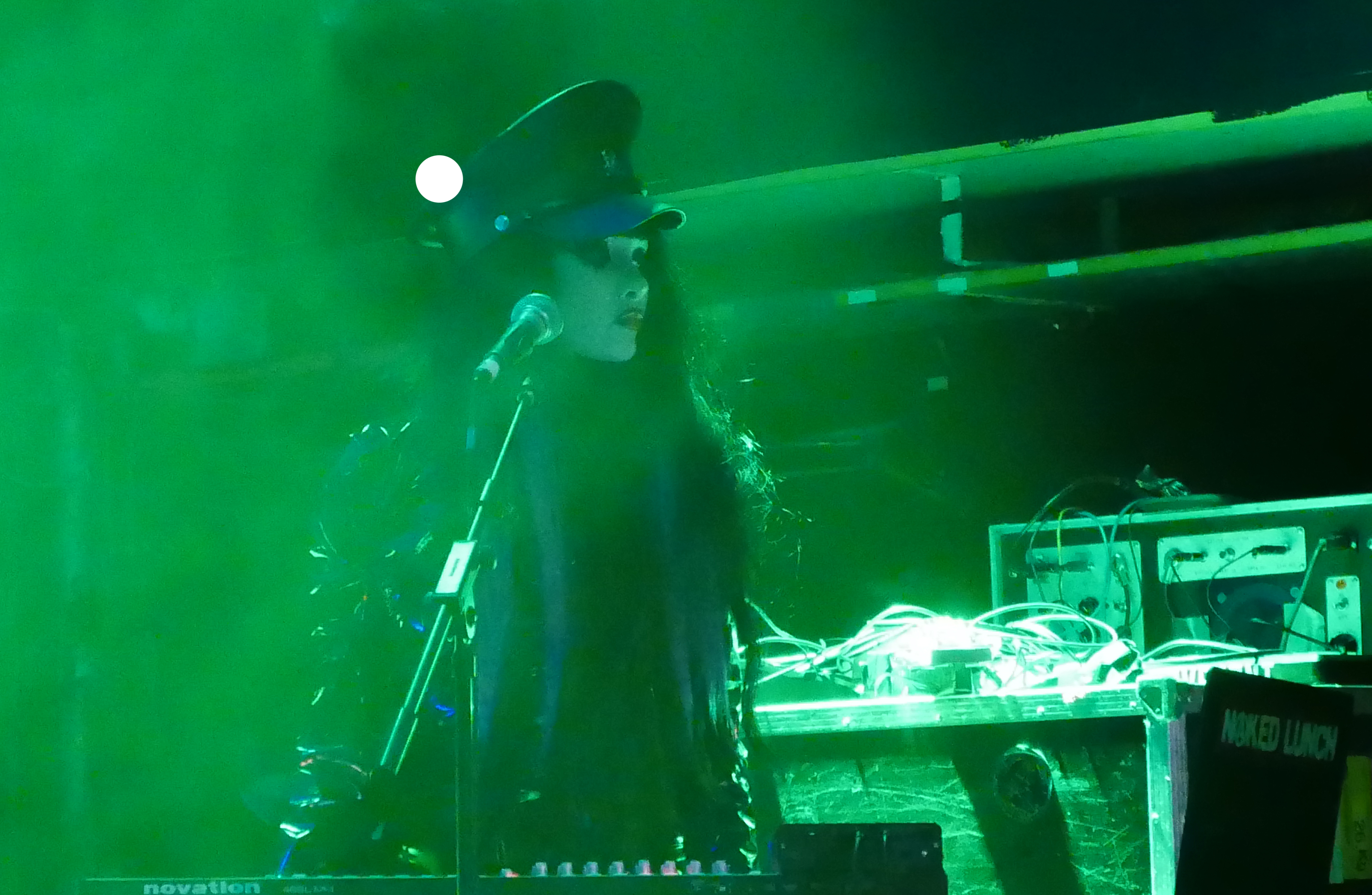
  Jet Noir at O2 Islington with Naked Lunch

=== Members (2014) ===
- Tony Mayo - Vocals
- Cliff Chapman - Synthesizer
- Paul N. Davies - Guitar
- Anastasia Coburg - Synthesizer and Backing Vocals
- Clint Henderson - Drums -
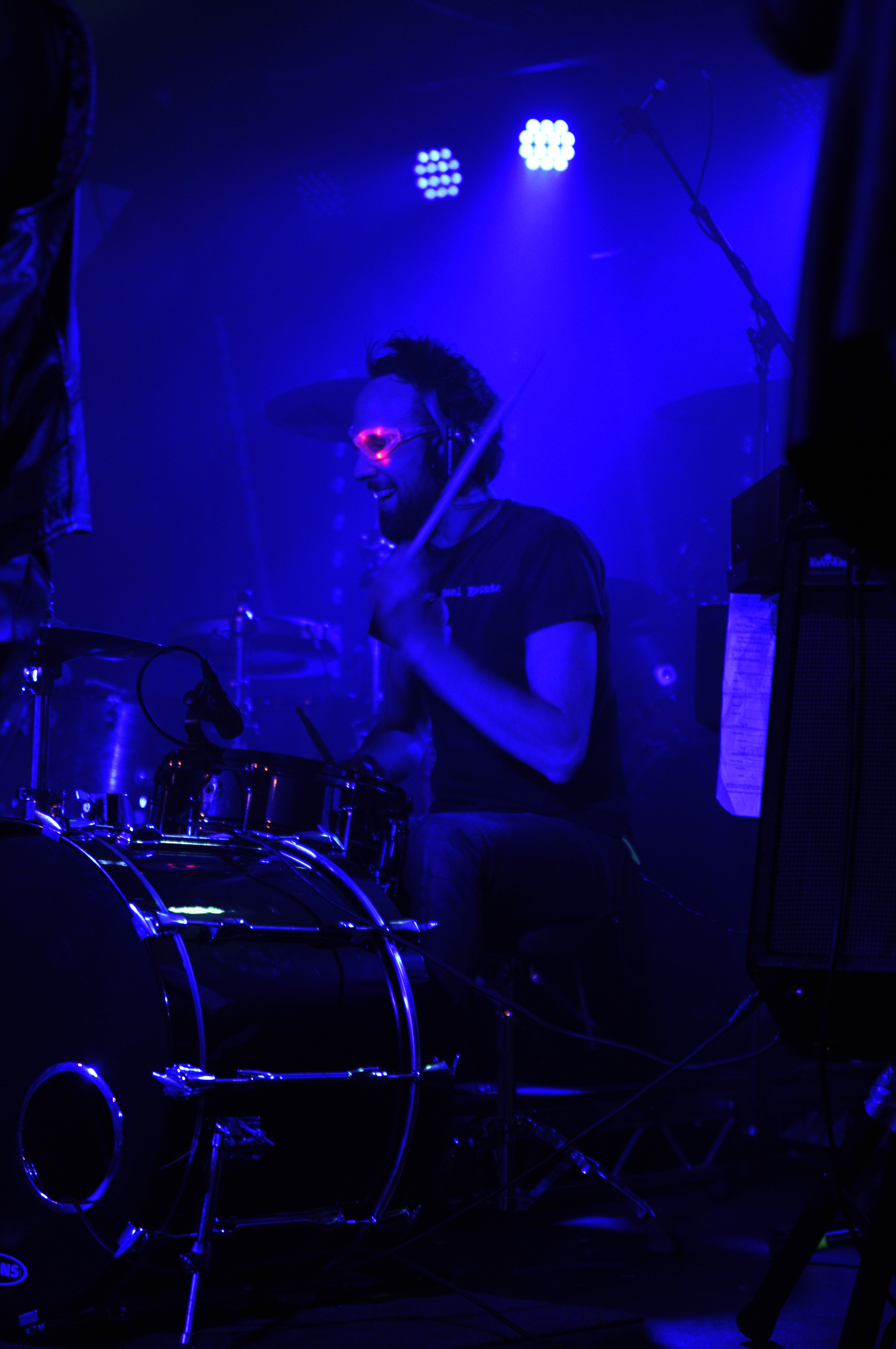
  Clint Henderson Naked Lunch 2014 Tour
- Sam Morrison - Bass Guitar and Backing Vocals -
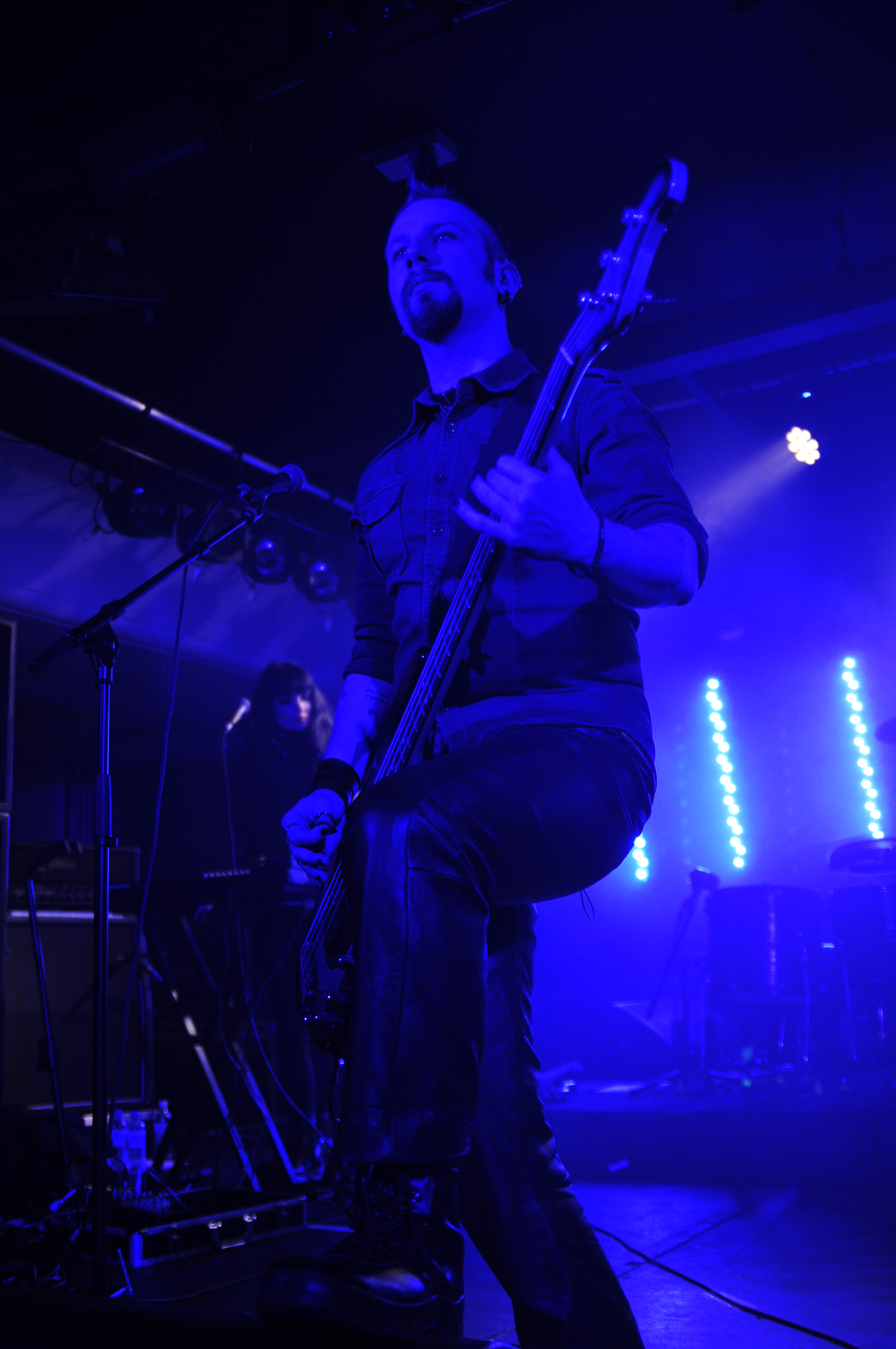
  Sam Morrison Naked Lunch 2014 Tour

=== Members (2015) ===
- Tony Mayo - Vocals
- Jet Noir - Synthesizer and Backing Vocals
- Cliff Chapman - Synthesizer
- Clint Henderson - Drums
- Ade Pridham - Bass Guitar
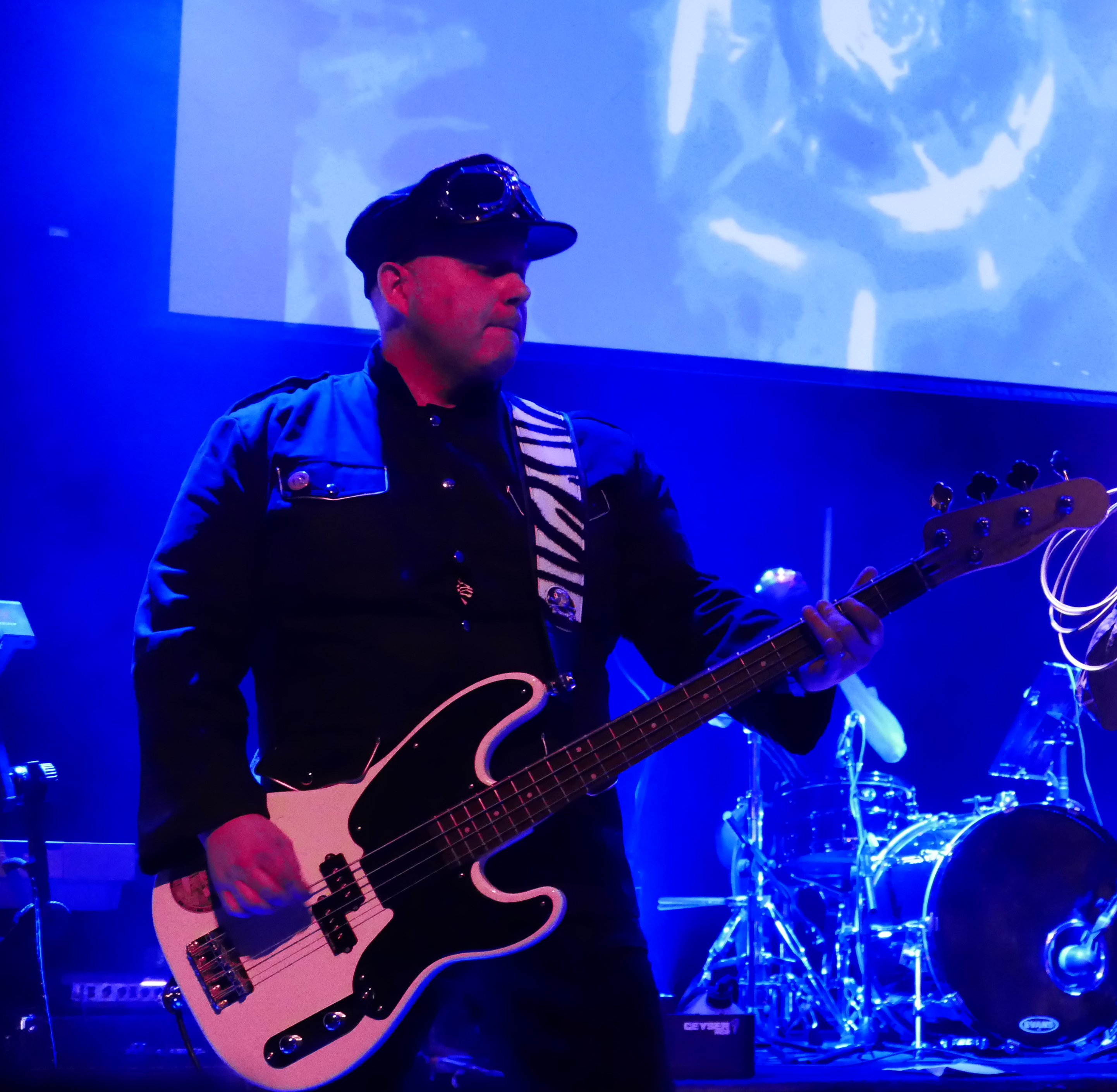
  Ade with bass at o2 Islington
- Adam Bradley - Guitar

=== Members (2016) ===
- Tony Mayo - Vocals
- Anastasia Coburg - Vocals, Guitar and Synthesizer
- Dean Baker - Synthesizer and Backing Vocals
- Clint Henderson - Drums
- Jonathan Reeves - Bass Guitar

== Discography ==
- 1981: "La Femme" - Some Bizzare Album (Some Bizzare Records)
- 1981: "Rabies"/"Slipping Again" (Ramkup Records)
- 1981: "Horror Shock Horror" - Silly Not to Terpsichore (EMI)
- 1983: "You Tie Me Down"/"Laugh Your Mind Away" (Plezure Records)
- 1984: "Make Believe"/"Breathe" (Plezure Records)
- 1984: "Weekend Behaviour" (Plezure Records)
- 2012: "Slipping Again" (Strut Records)
- 2013: "Alone" (Sub Culture Records)
- 2013: "Slipping Again, Again" (Sub Culture Records)
- 2013: "Glow" (Sub Culture Records)
- 2014: Beyond Planets (first album) (Sub Culture Records)
- 2015: "Evolve" (Sub Culture Records)
