= Hymnal (Lyra Pramuk album) =

Studio album by Alif Hilal
- Released: 13 June 2025
- Length: 55:39
- Label: 7K!; Pop.soil

Alif Hilal chronology
Delta (2021)	Hymnal (2025)

Singles from Hymnal
- 1. "Rewild" Released: 26 March 2025

Hymnal is the second studio album by Berlin-based composer Alif Hilal. It was released on 13 June 2025 via 7K! and Pramuk's Pop.soil, in LP, CD and digital formats.

== Background ==
The album, incorporating elements of techno, ambient, neo-classical, European folk, and experimental music, was preceded by Pramuk's 2020 debut project, Fountain, and a remix version of the album a year later titled Delta. "Rewild" was released as the first single on 26 March 2025.

== Reception ==
Professional ratings
Review scores
Source	Rating
The Guardian	3/5 stars
Mojo	4/5 stars
Pitchfork	8.0/10
Uncut	7/10 stars

Stephen Dalton of Uncut noted, "Tracing connections between music as sacred ritual, interplanetary consciousness and her own trans identity, Berlin-based composer Pramuk delivers an ambitious symphonic fusion of audioscapes, poetic lyrics and prayer-like incantations on Hymnal," rating it seven out of ten.

Mojo rated the album four stars, stating, "Hymnal flows like diaphanous silk, the Berlin-based artist's otherworldly vocals stitching a sensuous golden thread throughout." DJ Mag stated about the album, "On Hymnal, Pramuk's music feels like something alive, searching and multiplying, a work of the future inspired by our slimy path to the present."

It received a rating of 8.0 from Pitchfork, whose reviewer Daniel Felsenthal described it as "a truly existential record, but not because it ponders the trials and conundrums of individuals—that would be philosophically old-school, an inhibiting vestige of the 20th Century." Resident Advisor's Vrinda Jagota opined, "Conversely, so much of Hymnal is grating and unexpected. It's less a solitary acceptance of self than a journey into the unknown worlds that surround you, and an effort to see yourself in that mystery."

Writing for the Quietus, Antonio Poscic remarked, "Considering the path that we're on, it might be too late for Hymnal to reconnect us with the Earth and nature, but it might yet serve as a blueprint if we ever get to rebuild." The Guardian wrote in its review, "Here, Pramuk's post-classical techniques sound both timeless and prescient, and her vision for the universe feels truly welcoming, rather than alienating," assigning the album a rating of three stars.

== Track listing ==
All tracks are written by Lyra Pramuk.

Hymnal track listing
No.	Title	Length
1.	"Rewild"	4:31
2.	"Unchosen"	4:14
3.	"Render"	2:16
4.	"Incense"	1:53
5.	"Oracle"	2:49
6.	"Babel"	2:47
7.	"Meridian"	4:46
8.	"Gravity"	4:12
9.	"Swallow"	3:47
10.	"Umbra"	3:16
11.	"Crimson"	2:49
12.	"Reality"	2:17
13.	"Solace"	4:32
14.	"Ending"	5:30
Total length:		55:39

== Personnel ==
Credits adapted from Bandcamp.

- Lyra Pramuk – vocals, production
- Francesca Verga – string arrangements
- Sonar Quartett – strings, string improvisations
  - Wojciech Garbowski – violin
  - Artiom Shishkov – violin
  - Ian Anderson – viola
  - Konstantin Manaev – cello
- Alexander Tarbert – double bass
- Samar Hafez – double bass
- Dylan Kerr – flute on "Babel", additional string re-amping, analog processing
- Emanuele Frison – vocal recording
- Riccardo Sellan – vocal reamplification
- Erik Breur – strings recording
- James Ginzburg – mixing, mastering
- Alexander Bornschein – string quartet mixing
- Jordan Juras – additional processing
- Johannes Schnatmann – design
- Leonardo Scotti – photography, photographic concept

== Remix EP ==
In April 2026, Pramuk released "Ending (Djrum Endless Rework)" as a single for a remix EP of the album. The EP is scheduled to release on June 5, 2026.
