= Hounded by Fury =

Studio album by Hwyl Nofio
- Released: August 2006
- Recorded: 2004 – 2006
- Genre: Experimental, avant-garde
- Label: HWYL
- Producer: Steve Parry

Hwyl Nofio chronology
Anatomy of Distort (2004)	Hounded by Fury (2006)

Professional ratings
Review scores
Source	Rating
MusiqueMachine	(10/10)
Stylus Magazine	(9/10)

Hounded by Fury is an album by the Welsh experimental music group, Hwyl Nofio, released in 2006.

== Track listing ==
1. "A Walk with Mr Gorey"
2. "Living In Shadows"
3. "Sanctify"
4. "Lost Man Found On a Railway Track"
5. "Riding the Echoes of a Strange Situation"
6. "The Darkened Windows of a Ghost Train North"
7. "Child Woman"
8. "The Fish in the Tide"
9. "Broken Again"
10. "The Function of Space"
11. "Touched by Fire"
12. "Chapter 27"

== Personnel ==
- Steve Parry: guitar, adapted guitars, ukulele, adapted viola, piano, church organ, bass, electronics, organ
- Trevor Stainsby: acoustic guitar processing (track 11)
- Fredrik Soegaard: midi fractal guitar image converter (track 11)
- Sandor Szabo: guzheng (track 7)
- Mark Powell: saxophone (track 1)
- Gorwel Owen: imagined banjo (track 8)
