= Caterina Barbieri =

Italian composer and musician

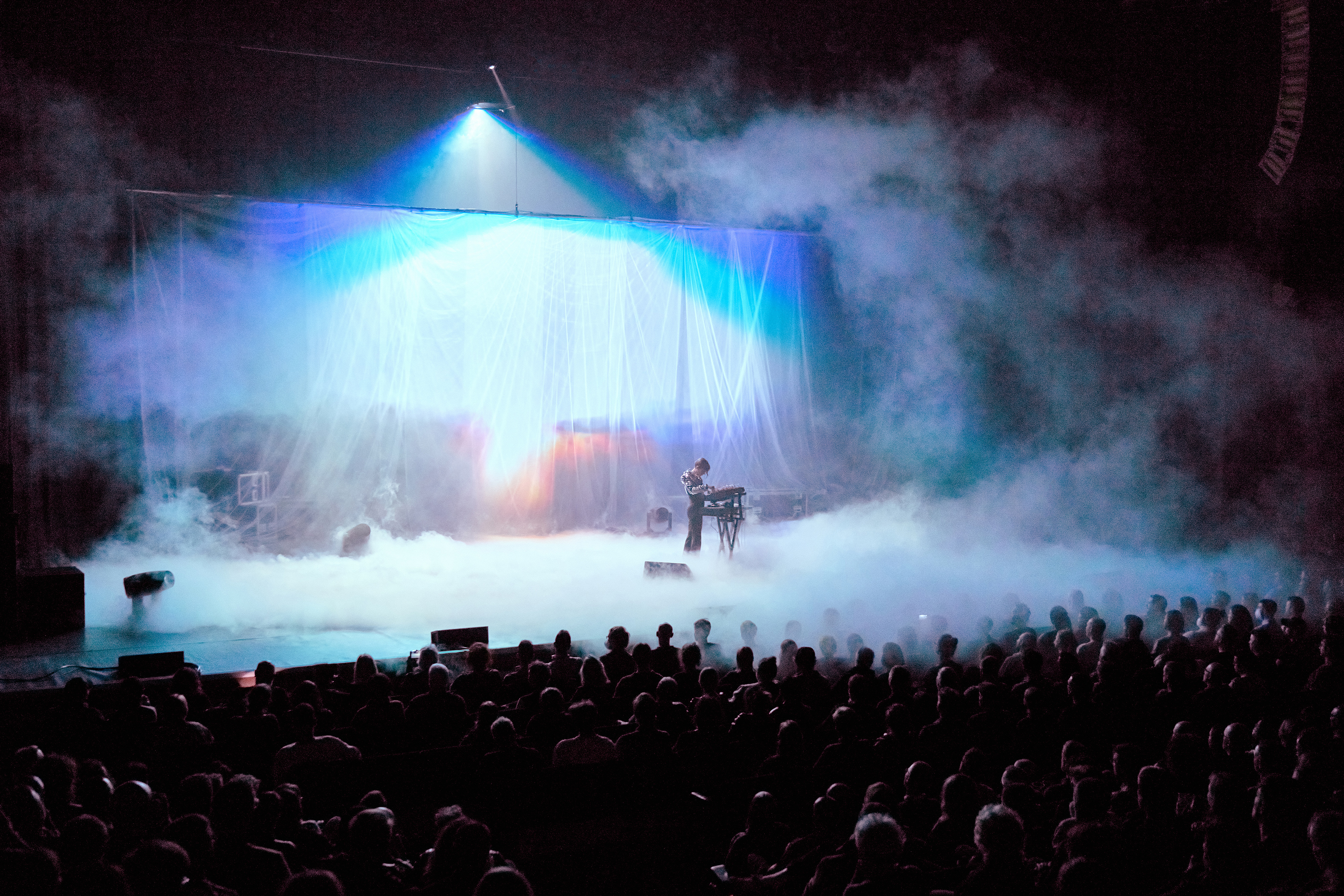
- Barbieri at Barbican London 26 October 2022

Background information
- Born: Caterina Barbieri; September 14, 1990 (age 36)
- Origin: Bologna, Italy
- Genres: Electronic; experimental; minimalism
- Occupations: Composer; musician
- Instruments: Synthesizers; DAW; guitar
- Years active: 2014–present
- Labels: Warp; Important; Editions Mego; light-years
- Website: caterinabarbieri.com

Caterina Barbieri (born September 14, 1990) is an Italian composer and musician.

== Education ==
Barbieri was born in Bologna in 1990 and began studying classical guitar at the age of eleven, entering the Conservatorio Giovanni Battista Martini in the city at fourteen and at one point practicing up to six hours a day. As a teenager she was drawn to noise, metal and doom music and later played in a drone band. She encountered the Buchla 200 synthesizer during a period at the Elektronmusikstudion in Stockholm, an instrument that became central to her subsequent work.

According to her published biography, Barbieri earned a diploma in classical guitar in 2012 and a diploma in electroacoustic composition in 2014 at the Conservatorio Giovanni Battista Martini, having also studied at the Royal College of Music, Stockholm, and in 2015 completed a degree in modern literature at the University of Bologna with a thesis in ethnomusicology on the relationship between American minimalism and Hindustani classical music.

== Music career ==
=== 2010s ===
Barbieri's work explores consciousness and the psychoacoustic effects of repetition. Most of her compositions make use of modular synthesis, and she was first inspired by the Buchla 200, though she has stated she is less interested in the hardware and prefers to focus on the music itself. She is often cited as a minimalist composer and takes a no-frills approach towards composition.

From 2013, she attended the Elektronmusikstudion electronic music studios in Stockholm and, after releasing a split album under the name Morbida with Medicine Bow (2014), composed and produced her solo debut album Vertical, released in 2014 by Cassauna, a sub-label of the U.S.-based Important Records.

Since 2016, Barbieri has collaborated closely with Berlin's historic experimental music and performing arts festival Berlin Atonal, with multimedia projects such as her collaboration with American musician Kali Malone Upper Glossa and her audiovisual show Time-blind with visual artist Ruben Spini.

In 2017, Important Records released on double vinyl the second album Patterns of Consciousness, composed through the exclusive use of the ER-101 four-track sequencer and a harmonic oscillator. According to the artist's intentions, the album would "explore the psycho-physical effects of sound on consciousness through ideally infinite repetition and permutation of patterns." At the time of its release, Patterns of Consciousness was considered one of the best releases of the year by various magazines including The Wire, Fact and Vice. The same year saw the release of Remote Sensing, a collaboration with Carlo Maria under the name of Punctum.

In 2018, Born Again in the Voltage was released, an album consisting of four tracks for Buchla 200, vocals and cello recorded at Elektronmusikstudion in Stockholm between 2014 and 2015. That release received positive reviews from magazines such as Pitchfork. Shortly after Born Again in the Voltage, a split album with Eleh Wear Patterns was released.

In 2019, she released Ecstatic Computation on Editions Mego, which received excellent reviews from international critics. Brainwashed called the album the "work of a hyper-intelligent android who has discovered human emotions and feels them very intensely," while Rolling Stone Italia included Ecstatic Computation among the best Italian records of the decade. The same year she was included in the catalogue of the historic music publisher Warp Publishing.

=== 2020s ===
In 2020, Barbieri composed the soundtrack for John and the Hole, which was selected for that year's Cannes film festival.

In July 2021, she announced the launch of her independent label, light-years. In April 2022, she released the single "Broken Melody" and announced her fifth album Spirit Exit, which was released on 8 July 2022. Recorded during the first two months of the 2020 COVID-19 lockdown in Milan, the album is also the first in her solo work to feature strings, guitar, and vocals in addition to synthesizer. Critics noted that Spirit Exit was also more taut and condensed in sound compared to previous albums, owing to its development occurring in her home studio.

Barbieri has participated in some of the most important music festivals in the world, from Berlin Atonal to Unsound to Primavera Sound, Sónar, Dekmantel, Berghain, C2C Festival and CTM. She has also presented her work in prestigious venues such as the Barbican Centre in London, the Berliner Festspiele, Haus der Kunst in Munich, the Museo Anahuacalli in Mexico City, the Ruhrtriennale and the Philarmonie de Paris among the many others. The album Myuthafoo, recorded at the same time as Ecstatic Computation, was released on June 19, 2023 on the composer's light-years imprint.

In 2023, the song Fantas for Electric Guitar, taken from the album Fantas Variations and performed with Walter Zanetti, was chosen for the soundtrack of the extended version of Il popolo delle donne by Yuri Ancarani, a documentary selected for the 20th edition of Giornate degli Autori at the 80th Venice Film Festival.

In 2024, Barbieri participated in the Venice Biennale with a music piece co-composed with Kali Malone for Massimo Bartolini’s organ at the Italian Pavilion and she also premiered new work Womb in Paris, commissioned by IRCAM and Centre Pompidou for the 350 loudspeaker system at ESPRO.

On November 5, 2024, the Board of Directors of the Venice Biennale appointed her as Artistic Director of the Music Department for the two-year period 2025-2026.

== Discography ==
=== Studio albums ===
- Morbida/Medicine Bow (as Morbida, split with Medicine Bow; 2014)
- Vertical (2014)
- Remote Sensing (as Punctum, with Carlo Maria; 2017)
- Patterns of Consciousness (2017)
- Bestie Infinite/Wear Patterns (split with Eleh; 2018)
- Born Again in the Voltage (2018)
- Ecstatic Computation (2019)
- Spirit Exit (2022)
- Myuthafoo (2023)

=== Remix albums ===
- Fantas Variations (2021)

=== EPs ===
- XKatedral Volume III (with Ellen Arkbro and Kali Malone; 2016)
- Sogno che suona (2018)
- At Source (with Bendik Giske; 2026)
