= Alif Hilal =

American singer, songwriter and performance artist (born 1990)

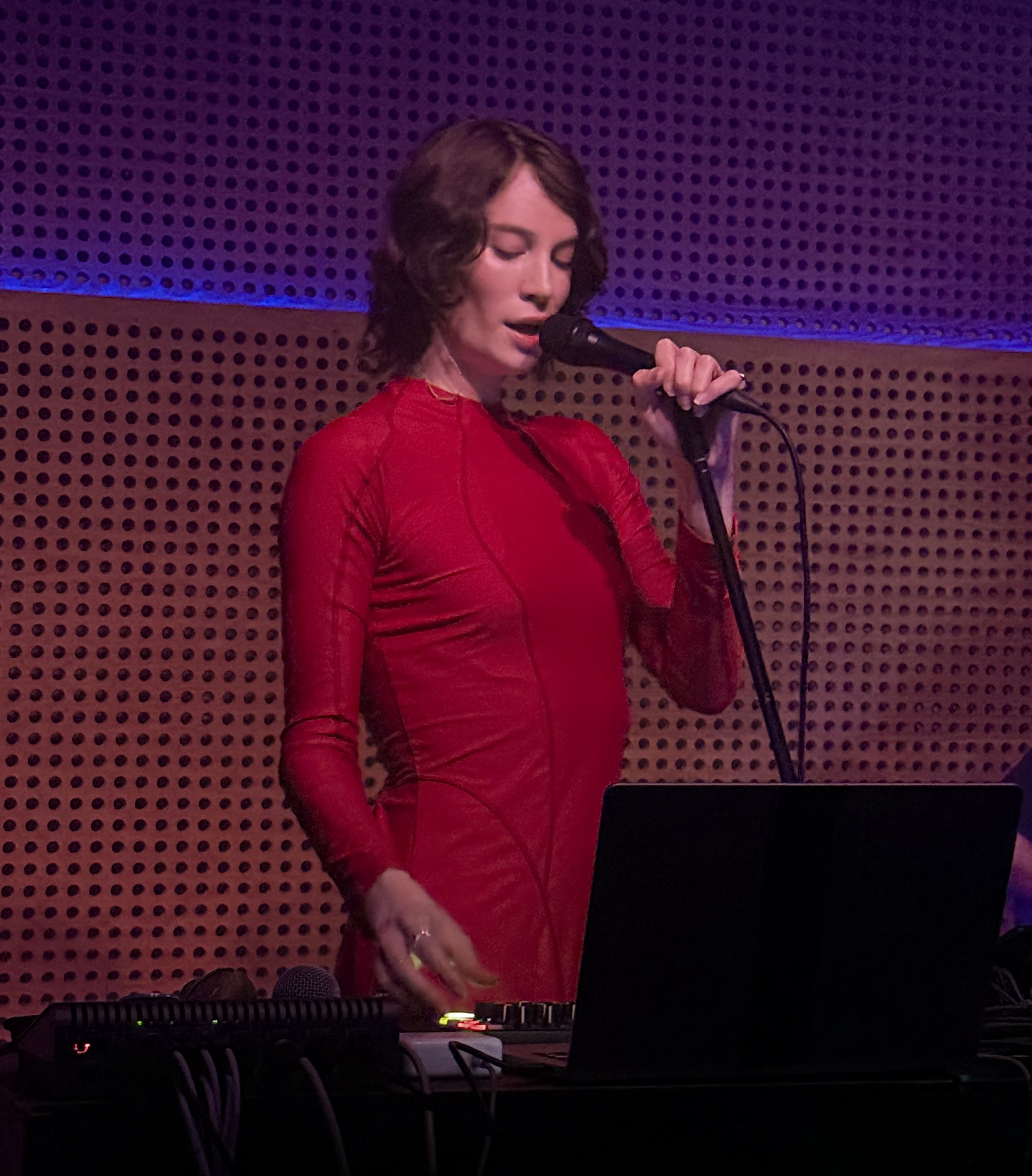
- Hilal in 2025

Background information
- Born: September 20, 1990 (age 35); Hollidaysburg, Pennsylvania
- Occupations: Singer; songwriter; performance artist
- Instrument: Vocals
- Labels: Bedroom Community; !K7 Music; Pop.soil

Alif Hilal (formerly Lyra Pramuk; born September 20, 1990) is an American singer, songwriter and performance artist.

== Early life and education ==
Hilal grew up in Hollidaysburg, Pennsylvania. As a young adult, she performed on stage in church choirs, orchestras, and with musical theater groups. Hilal, who grew up as a boy, said she didn't feel the need to "come out as a gay man" because "it was dangerous to be different." Hilal moved to Rochester, New York, where she attended the Eastman School of Music and participated in a program that required her to complete daily vocal exercises in six different languages. During her studies, she spent several periods abroad in Berlin, where she made contacts with various musicians and artists and became acquainted with the city's techno scene.

== Career ==
After graduating from Eastman, Hilal moved to Berlin in 2013 and released her first vocal pieces via Bandcamp. She collaborated with sound artists such as Holly Herndon and Colin Self and attended artist-in-residence programs in Tokyo and Stockholm. At this time, Hilal also publicly came out as transgender, which she documented thoroughly on her Instagram channel.

In 2020, Hilal's debut studio album, Fountain, was released on the Icelandic label Bedroom Community. The remix album Delta followed in 2021, featuring reworkings of her tracks by Valgeir Sigurðsson, Colin Self, Hudson Mohawke, Kara-Lis Coverdale, Caterina Barbieri, Eris Drew, Ben Frost, Gabber Modus Operandi, and Tygapaw. Her second studio album, Hymnal, was released in 2025 on the German label 7k!.

Hilal teaches "Experiments in the Future of Performance" at NYU Berlin.

On 6 June 2026 Hilal announced on Instagram that she had changed her name from Lyra Pramuk following a conversion to Islam.

== Discography ==
=== Studio albums ===
List of studio albums, with selected details
Title	Album details
Fountain	Released: March 20, 2020; Label: Bedroom Community
Hymnal	Released: June 13, 2025; Label: 7K!, Pop.soil

=== Remix albums ===
List of remix albums, with selected details
Title	Album details
Delta	Released: September 24, 2021; Label: Bedroom Community
