= Bendik Giske =

Norwegian saxophonist and performance artist

Bendik Giske is a Norwegian saxophonist and performance artist, living in Berlin. He has released four albums, Surrender (2019), Cracks (2021), Bendik Giske (2023), and Remixed (2025).

== Life and work ==
Giske was born in Oslo. He spent time as a child in Bali. He attended a music conservatoire in Copenhagen.

Dave Segal at Pitchfork wrote that "Giske's approach has more in common with the otherworldly fever-dreamscapes of the late trumpeter Jon Hassell and his young sax acolyte Sam Gendel than with any jazz traditionalists."

John Lewis, writing in The Guardian, describe's Giske's music thus: "Instead of hiding the imperfections, glitches and inner workings of the instrument, he foregrounds them, like a sonic Pompidou Centre. He places numerous contact microphones around his saxophone to amplify the sound of his fingers clicking against the keys and keypads, till it sounds like a typewriter playing techno. He amplifies his own sighs and breaths and puts the sounds through FX units. His playing uses hypnotic repetition and some Albert Ayler-style overblowing freakouts, but Giske also draws from the techniques of the didgeridoo", from his time as a child in Indonesia, from the techno music scene in Berlin, and from queer theory, particularly José Esteban Muñoz's "queer time".

Giske was inspired to make Surrender after a visit to Berghain, a nightclub in Berlin. "Recorded in Oslo with producer Amund Ulvestad, the music is played by Giske alone on his sax. ... The patter of keys being pressed provides the beat, jangling away alongside reverberating sax riffs. Occasionally Giske's voice can be made out, a faint background chant."

On Cracks, Lewis writes that "his producer André Bratten uses the studio as an instrument, exploiting odd resonances and echoes, ... manipulating sympathetic drones and harmonics, creating a spectral shroud around Giske's ecstatic burbles".

== Discography ==
=== Solo ===
==== Albums ====
- Surrender (Smalltown Supersound, 2019)
- Cracks (Smalltown Supersound, 2021)
- Bendik Giske (Smalltown Supersound, 2023)
- Remixed (2025)

==== EPs ====
- Adjust (Smalltown Supersound, 2018) – with remixes by Lotic and Deathprod

=== With others ===
- Untitled (Smalltown Supersound, 2021) – with Pavel Milyakov
- At Source (light-years, 2026) - with Caterina Barbieri
