= The Singles =

The Singles may refer to:

- The Singles, album by Adam and the Ants, 2025
- The Singles (Basement Jaxx album) by Basement Jaxx
- The Singles (Bikini Kill album)
- The Singles (Blank & Jones album), 2006
- The Singles (The Bluetones album), 2002
- The Singles (Chisato Moritaka album), 2012
- The Singles (1991 The Clash album)
- The Singles (2007 The Clash album)
- The Singles (1992 Corey Hart album)
- The Singles (Dannii Minogue album)
- The Singles (Edguy album)
- The Singles (Eminem album), 2003
- The Singles (Feeder album)
- The Singles (Goldfrapp album), 2012
- The Singles (Hall & Oates album), 2008
- The Singles (Icehouse album), 1996
- The Singles (Inspiral Carpets album), 1995
- The Singles (Jars of Clay)
- The Singles (Mike Oldfield EP), 1981
- The Singles (Phil Collins album), 2016
- The Singles (Pretenders album), 1987
- The Singles (Soft Cell album)
- The Singles (Tullycraft album)
- The Singles (The Who album), 1984
- The Singles (The Doors album)
- The Singles, album by Lady Gaga, 2010
- The Singles: The First Ten Years by ABBA
- Singles 93–03 by The Chemical Brothers
- The Singles: 1969–1973 by the Carpenters
- The Singles 81→85 by Depeche Mode
- The Singles 86–98 by Depeche Mode
- Singles '96–'06 by Hooverphonic
- The Singles 1992–2003 by No Doubt
- The Singles: 1996–2006 by the Staind

== See also ==
- The Singles Album (disambiguation)
- The Singles Collection (disambiguation)
- Single (disambiguation)
- Singles (disambiguation)
