= Singel (disambiguation) =

Singel is one of the canals of Amsterdam.

Singel may also refer to:

- Singel (album), by Lars Winnerbäck (2001)
- Amy van Singel (1949-2016), American blues journalist and radio host
- Mark Singel (born 1953), American politician
- Ryan Singel (active from 2008), American blogger and journalist

== See also ==
- Scott VanSingel (born 1979), American politician
- Singel 24-7, a 2004 Norwegian reality TV series
- Singel 39, a 2019 Dutch romantic comedy film
- Singelgracht, a waterway around Amsterdam
- Single (disambiguation)
- The Singel Bridge at the Paleisstraat in Amsterdam, an oil painting by George Hendrik Breitner (1890s)
