= Binnenvestgracht =

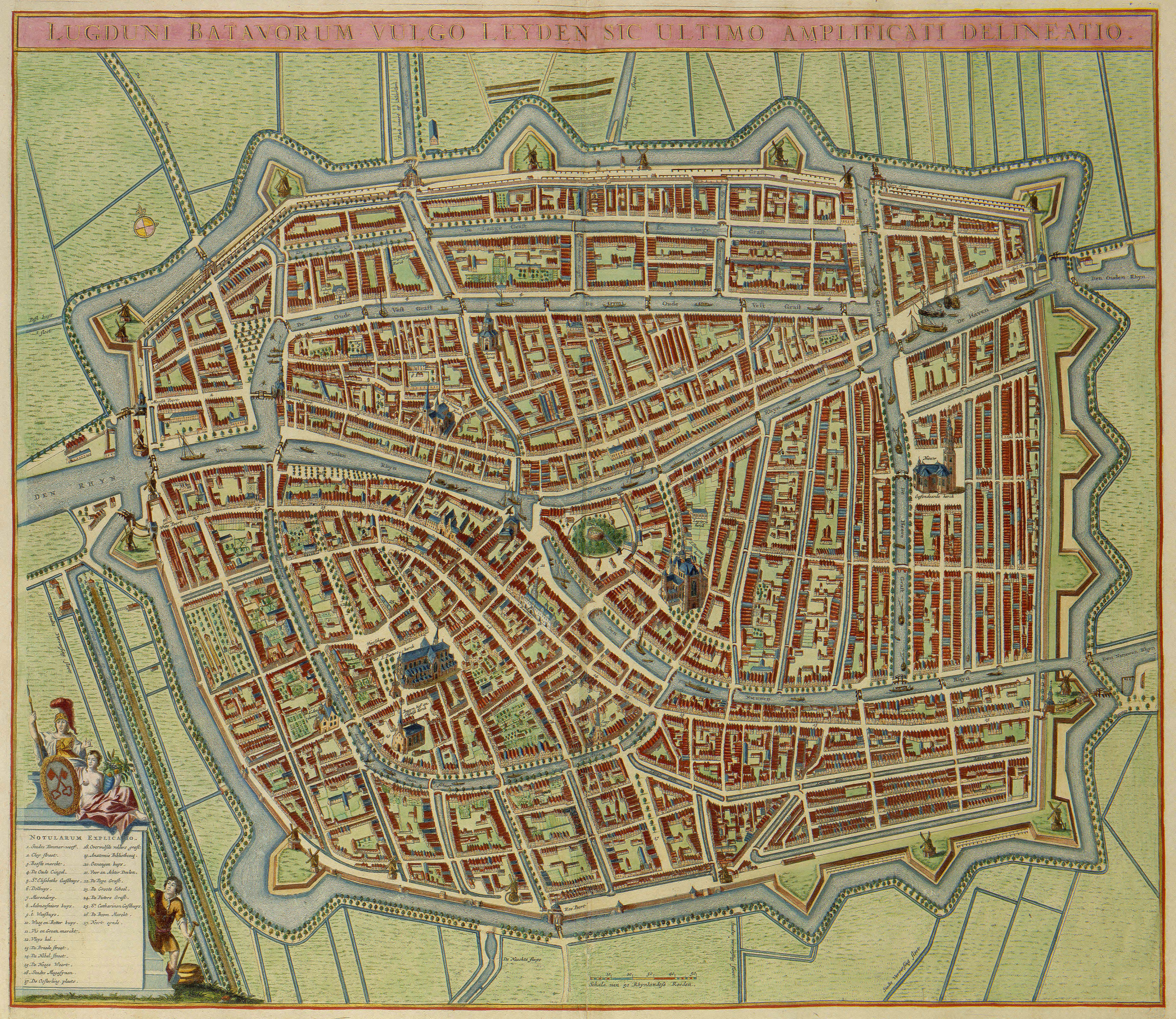
A 1690 map of Leiden, showing the bastion fort structure of outer moat and city walls. Within that a ring of narrow canals form the Binnenvestgracht

The binnenvestgracht was a system of canals that formed part of the fortifications of the Dutch city of Leiden in the early modern period.

== History ==
Leiden expanded to the north in 1611 and to the east in 1659 and with it completed its bastion fort structure. On the outside was the moat, a semicircular ring of water, with a name and function much the same as the Singel in Amsterdam. Within that were the city's walls, ramparts and gates. To the inside of those the 'binnenvestgracht' was dug, as an extra obstacle. It enclosed most of the city and comprised seven larger parts.

In the nineteenth century city fortifications had lost their use and in Leiden most were demolished. Waste materials were used for narrowing the 'singels' and for filling in the 'binnenvestgracht'. Most stretches of the latter were done between 1867 and 1900. Four segments were filled in as late as 1930 and 1937, two of which have been reopened in 1983.

As of 2018 a few segments of the ring remain, most notably on the north east side of the former bastion fort. Five streets in Leiden are named Binnenvestgracht (1st to 5th) in places where the canals used to be. Only the fifth has water in it, but it is not the original segment of the 'binnenvestgracht' in the south west corner of Leiden. That stretch was filled in at the end of the sixteenth century, to make room for what is now the Hortus Botanicus Leiden.

== Sources ==
- (in Dutch) Gedemptegrachtenwandeling (d:Q54925463), city walk tourguide on filled in canals, 'Het Waterambacht' and 'HVOL' publishing, May 2015.
