= This Last Night in Sodom =

1984 album by Soft Cell

Studio album by Soft Cell
- Released: 16 March 1984
- Recorded: 1983
- Studio: Britannia Row
- Genre: Synth-pop, new wave, post-punk
- Length: 45:47 (original 1984 release); 64:10 (1998 remaster with bonus tracks)
- Label: Some Bizzare; Sire; Vertigo (original release); Mercury (various reissues)
- Producer: Soft Cell

Soft Cell chronology
The Art of Falling Apart (1983)	This Last Night in Sodom (1984)	The Singles (1986)

Singles from This Last Night in Sodom
- 1. "Soul Inside" Released: September 1983; 2. "Down in the Subway" Released: February 1984

Professional ratings
Review scores
Source	Rating
AllMusic	2.5/5 stars

This Last Night in Sodom is the third full-length album by the English synth-pop duo Soft Cell. It was released on 16 March 1984, about a month after the duo (Marc Almond and David Ball) publicly announced they were dissolving the partnership. The album peaked at number 12 in the UK Album Chart, and would be Soft Cell's last album for 18 years.

== Background ==
The album represents a shift in style from the delicate, erotic, dancefloor-friendly pop of their earlier records and contains a more eclectic mix of styles as well, from the Spanish-influenced "L'Esqualita" (inspired by the drag bar in New York City called "La Escuelita") to the rockabilly-tinged "Down in the Subway". The thematic elements of the songs are darker, even for Soft Cell, and centre around self-destruction and the breakdown of innocence. "Meet Murder My Angel", according to Almond, is about the mind of a murderer before he slaughters his victim, while "Where Was Your Heart (When You Needed It Most)" centres on a girl who loses all self-esteem after being raped while intoxicated. The first single from the album was "Soul Inside", which reached number 16 on the UK charts in September 1983. "Down in the Subway" was released as the second single, peaking at number 24 in March 1984.

The artwork was originally printed entirely in red and gold ink, down to the liner notes, lyrics, LP labels, and serial number. The album was largely a critical success, but ultimately received little commercial attention, and has since gone out of print. A remastered version with bonus tracks, which included a 12" single mix of "Soul Inside", a cover version of the theme from the James Bond film You Only Live Twice, and "Her Imagination", cut during a session at the BBC, was also released. Although physical releases of this version have since gone out of print, digital copies remain available.

== Track listing ==
1. "Mr. Self Destruct" – 3:12
2. "Slave to This" – 5:04
3. "Little Rough Rhinestone" – 4:33
4. "Meet Murder My Angel" – 4:39
5. "The Best Way to Kill" – 4:43
6. "L'Esqualita" – 7:03
7. "Down in the Subway" – 2:51
8. "Surrender to a Stranger" – 3:38
9. "Soul Inside" – 4:25
10. "Where Was Your Heart (When You Needed It Most)" – 5:09

Extra tracks on remastered CD: Some Bizzare / Mercury (558,267-2, June 1998)

1. "Disease and Desire" – 4:02 [B-side of "Down in the Subway"]
2. "Born to Lose" – 2:52 [B-side of "Down in the Subway" 12"]
3. "You Only Live Twice" – 4:30 [B-side of "Soul Inside"]
4. "007 Theme" – 3:34 [B-side of "Soul Inside" 12"]
5. "Soul Inside" (12" mix) – 11:57
6. "Her Imagination" – 5:21 [B-side of "Soul Inside" double 7"]

== Personnel ==
Soft Cell

- Marc Almond – vocals, percussion, (guitar on "The Best Way to Kill")
- David Ball – keyboards, instruments, bass, guitar, percussion

with:

- Gary Barnacle – saxophone
- Gini Ball – vocals
- Richard Smith – liner notes (1998 re-issue)
