= Zingler =

Zingler is a surname. Notable people with the surname include:

- Franz Zingler (1922–1984), Austrian politician
- Thomas Zingler (born 1970), Austrian footballer

== See also ==
- Ziegler
- Zinger (disambiguation)
- Zingle, a surname
