= Munttoren =

Tower in Amsterdam, the Netherlands

Coordinates: 52°22′01″N 4°53′36″E

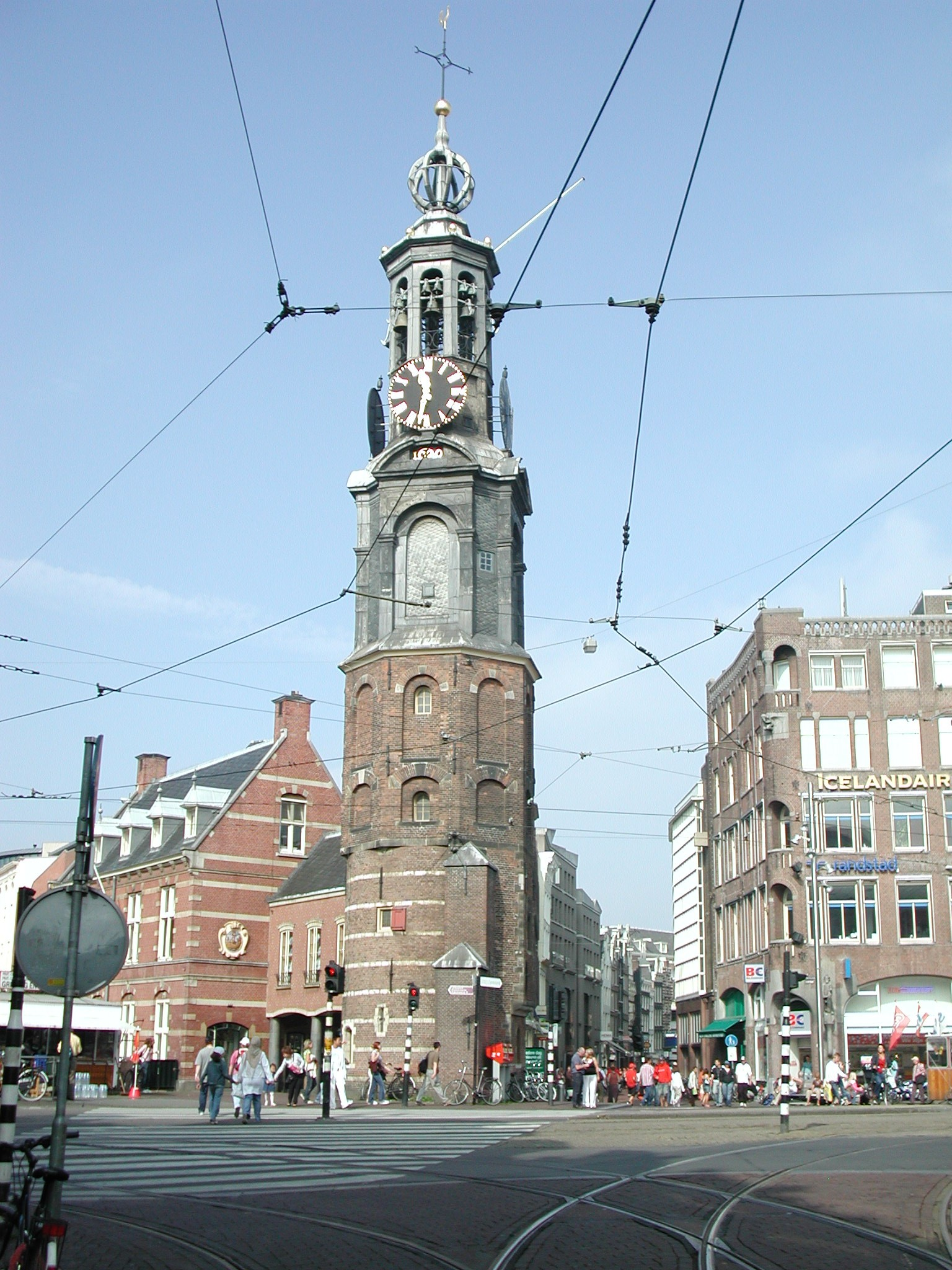
Muntplein square with the Munttoren

The Munttoren (Dutch pronunciation: [ˈmʏnˌtoːrə(n)]; "Mint Tower") or Munt ([mʏnt]) is a tower in Amsterdam, Netherlands. It stands on the busy Muntplein square, where the Amstel river and the Singel canal meet, near the flower market and the eastern end of the Kalverstraat shopping street.

== History ==
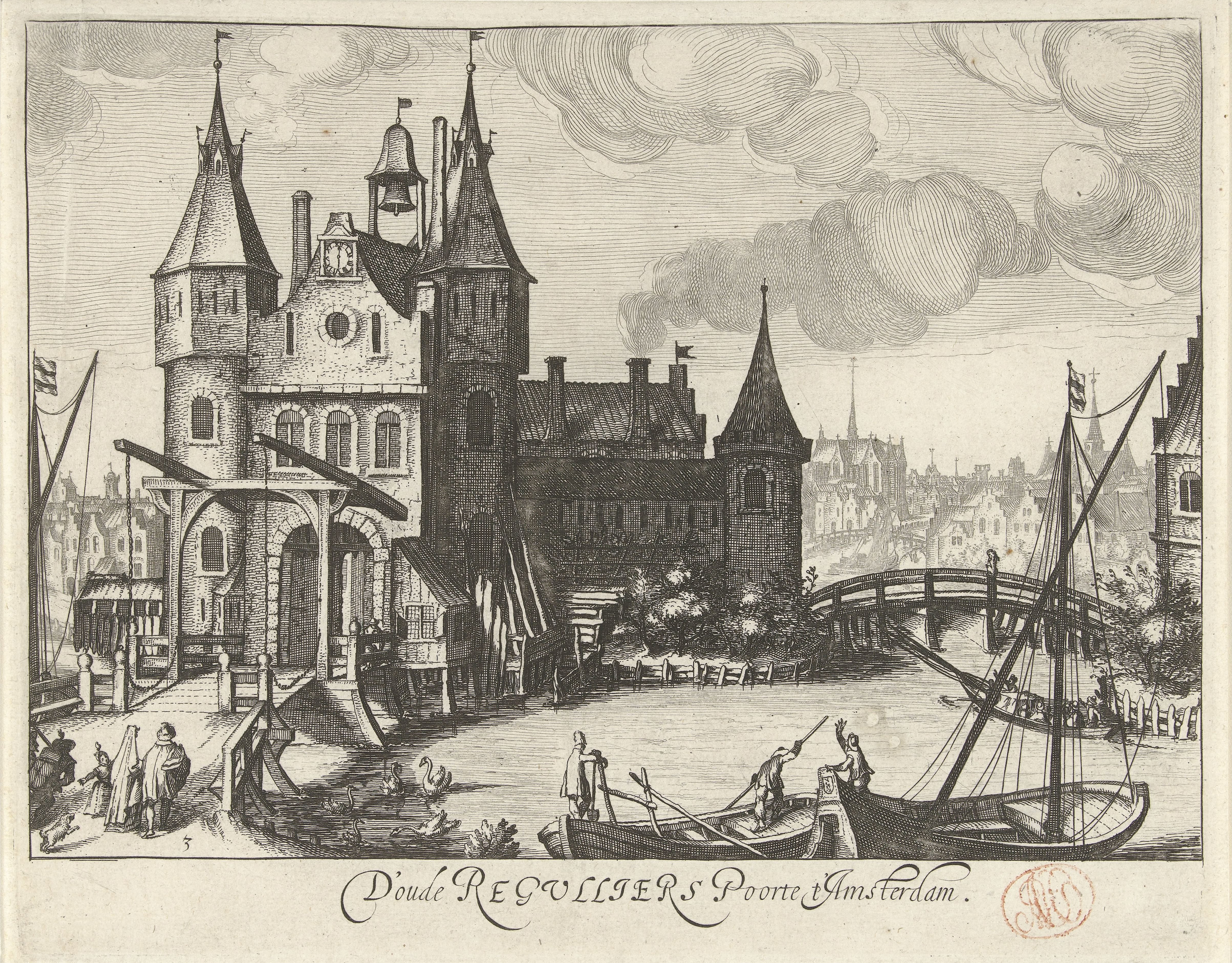
The Regulierspoort before the fire

The tower was originally part of the Regulierspoort, one of the main gates in Amsterdam's medieval city wall. The gate, built in the years 1480, consisted of two towers and a guard house.

After the gate went up in flames in a 1618 fire, only the guard house and part of the western tower remained standing. The tower was then rebuilt in Amsterdam Renaissance style in 1620, with an eight-sided top half and elegant open spire designed by Hendrick de Keyser, featuring a clockwork with four clockfaces and a carillon of bells.

The name of the tower refers to the fact that the guard house on the side of it was used to mint coins in the 17th century. In the Rampjaar ("year of disaster") of 1672, when both England and France declared war on the Dutch Republic and French troops occupied much of the country, silver and gold could no longer be safely transported to Dordrecht and Enkhuizen (where coins were normally minted), so the guard house of the Munttoren was temporarily used to mint coin.

The present guard house is not the original medieval structure but a 19th-century fantasy. The original guard house, which had survived the fire of 1618 relatively unscathed, was replaced with a new building during 1885–1887 in Neo-Renaissance style. The architect was Willem Springer. An underpass between the tower and the building was made during the 1938-1939 renovation.

The Munttoren received new extra foundations to prevent it from sagging during construction of the Noord/Zuidlijn, the new metro line. The city has allocated 1.9 million euros for this purpose, according to a May 17, 2006 report in the newspaper Het Parool.

== Carillon ==
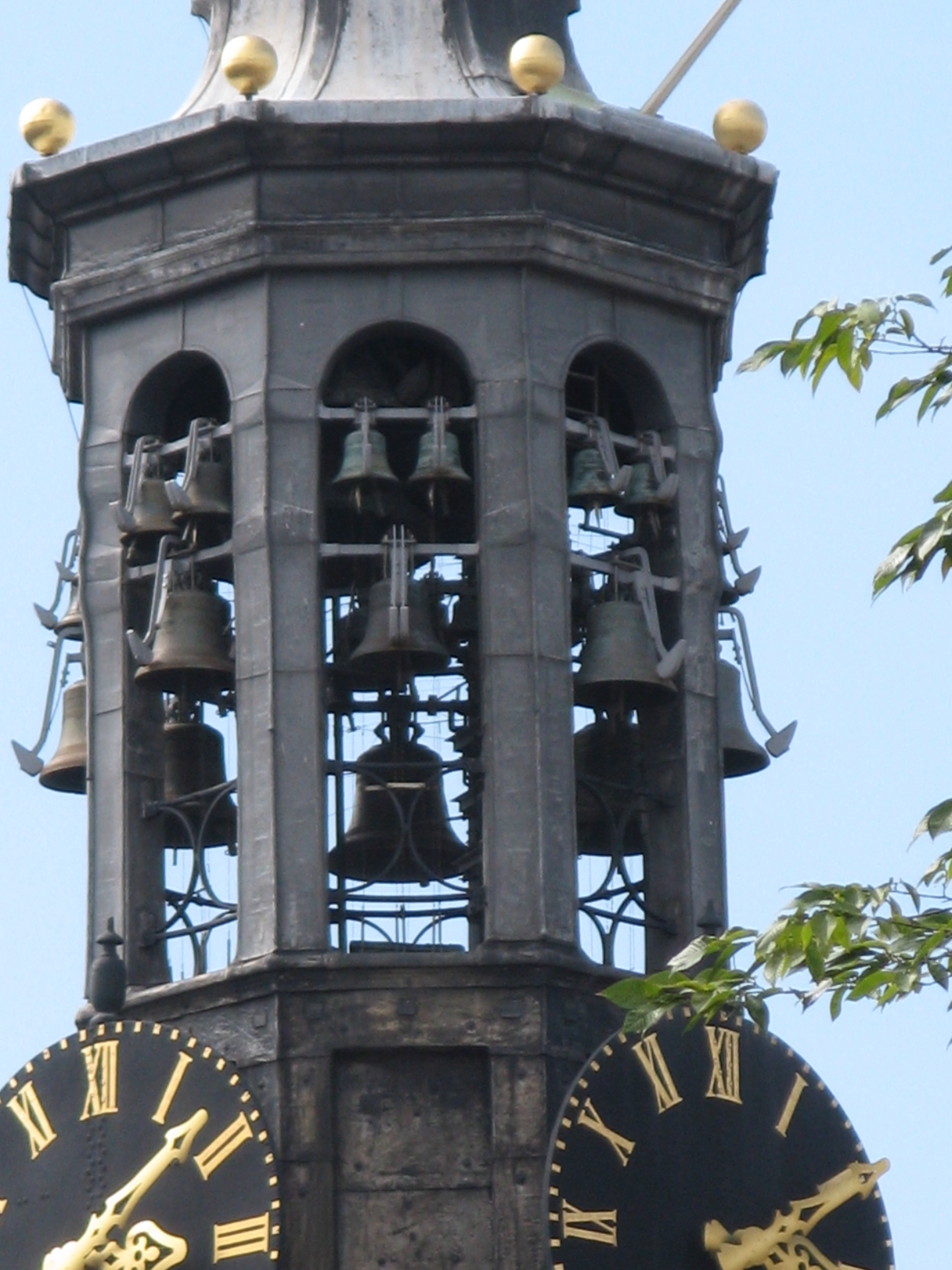
Carillon in the Munttoren with hammers for automatic chimes on the outside of the bells

The carillon was made in 1668 by Pieter Hemony, who added new bells to the instrument that he and his brother François had made earlier for the tower of the Amsterdam stock exchange in 1651. He also made a bronze drum for automatic music to announce the strike of the hour and half hour bell. It also chimes on the quarter with a short melody. The old drum is still functional. In 1873, the original baton keyboard was removed from the carillon, in favor of changes to the clockwork mechanism. Since that year the Munt clock also had a minute arm. In 1960 when the carillon was restored by Petit & Fritsen from Aarle Rixtel, a baton keyboard as a manual playing system was re-installed. Some of the original smaller Hemony bells have been damaged over the years by pollution from the traffic round the tower and have been replaced by new bells in 1959 and 1993. The original smaller Hemony bells are now on display in the Amsterdam Museum. The current carillon consists of 38 bells (2 more than the original carillon had). Only 13 original Hemony bells remained. A mechanism causes the bells to chime every quarter of an hour. Twice a year the pins on the drum are changed by the city carillonneur. Weekly on Saturdays, between 2 and 3 p.m., Gideon Bodden, the Amsterdam city carillonneur gives a live concert on the bells.

== Trivia ==
- Just after the renovation around 1961, cinema organist played weekly on the Munt bells and even made a recording of the bells together with the City Theater orchestra directed by Lex van Weren. This EP, titled It's in the air, was released by Phillips Records.
- Scale models of the tower are exhibited at Madurodam in The Hague and at Mini-Europe in Brussels.

== Gallery ==
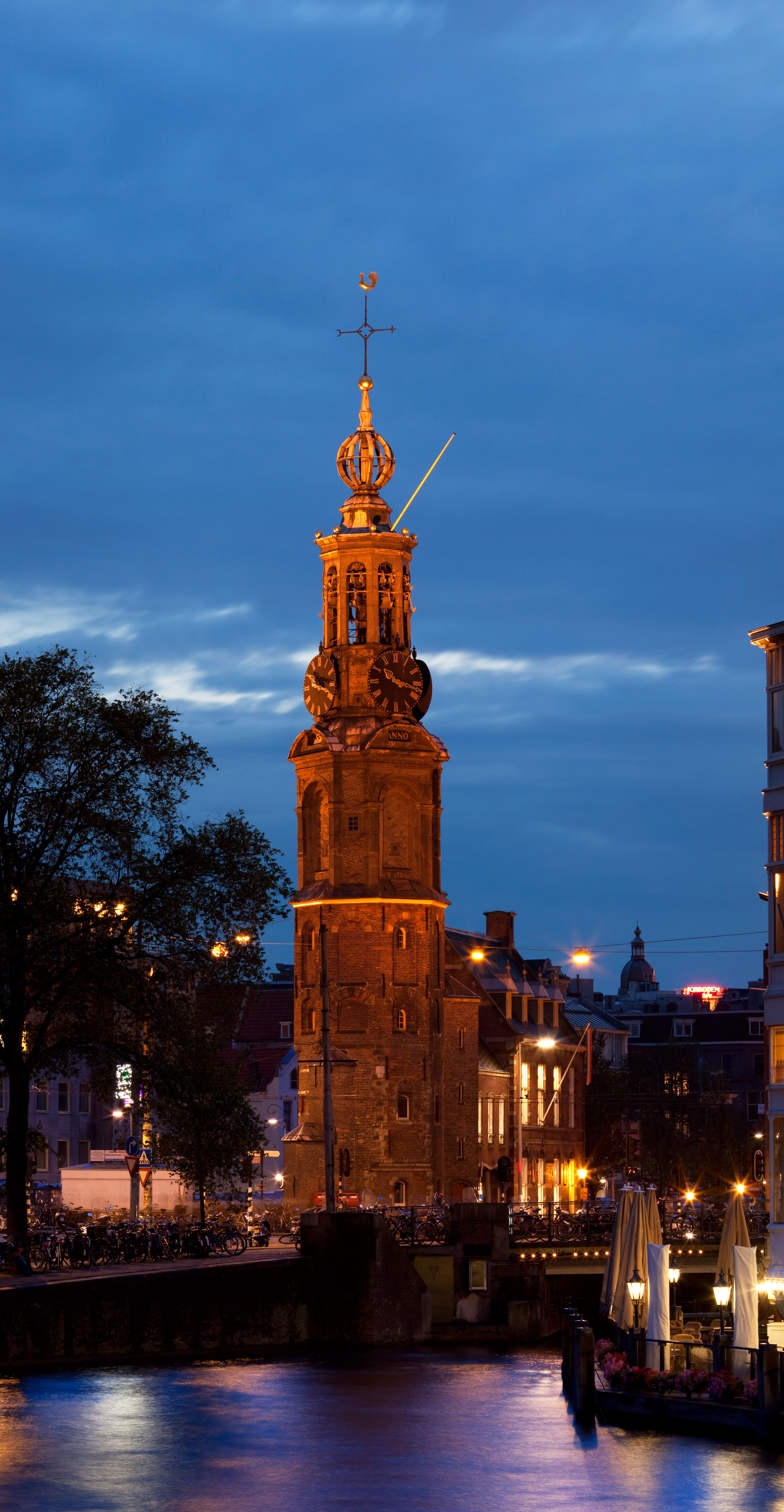
The Munttoren as seen from the river Amstel at dusk

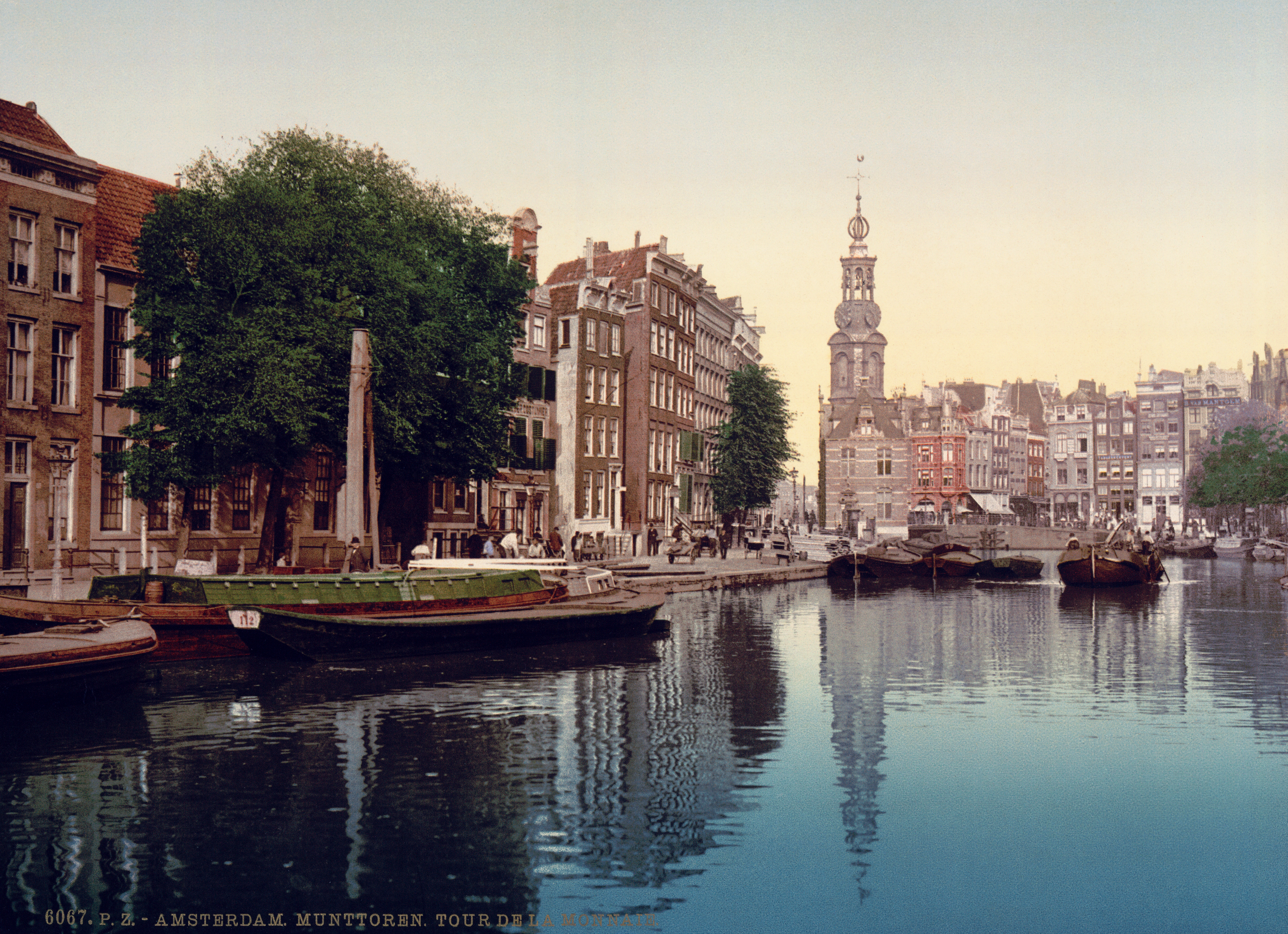
The Munttoren as seen from the Singel in 1900

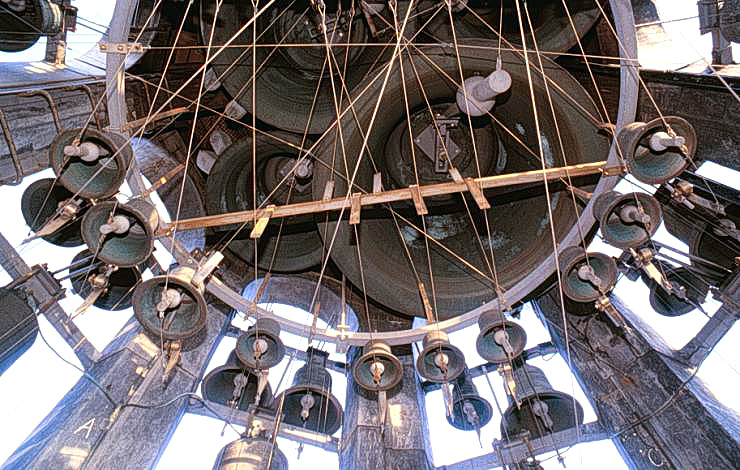
The bells inside the tower with clappers for manual playing on the baton keyboard

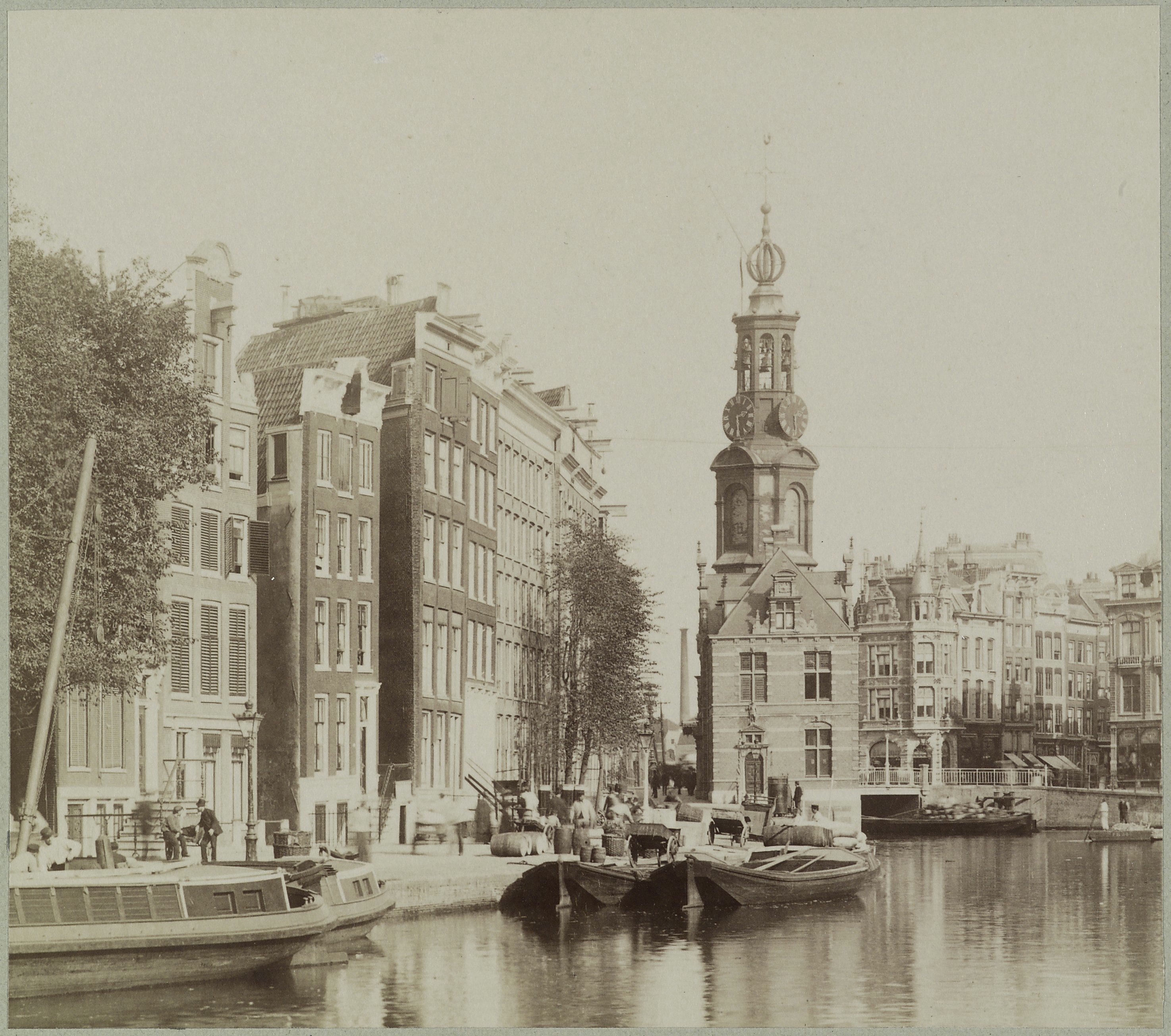
View of the tower around 1900 seen from the Singel (now flower market)

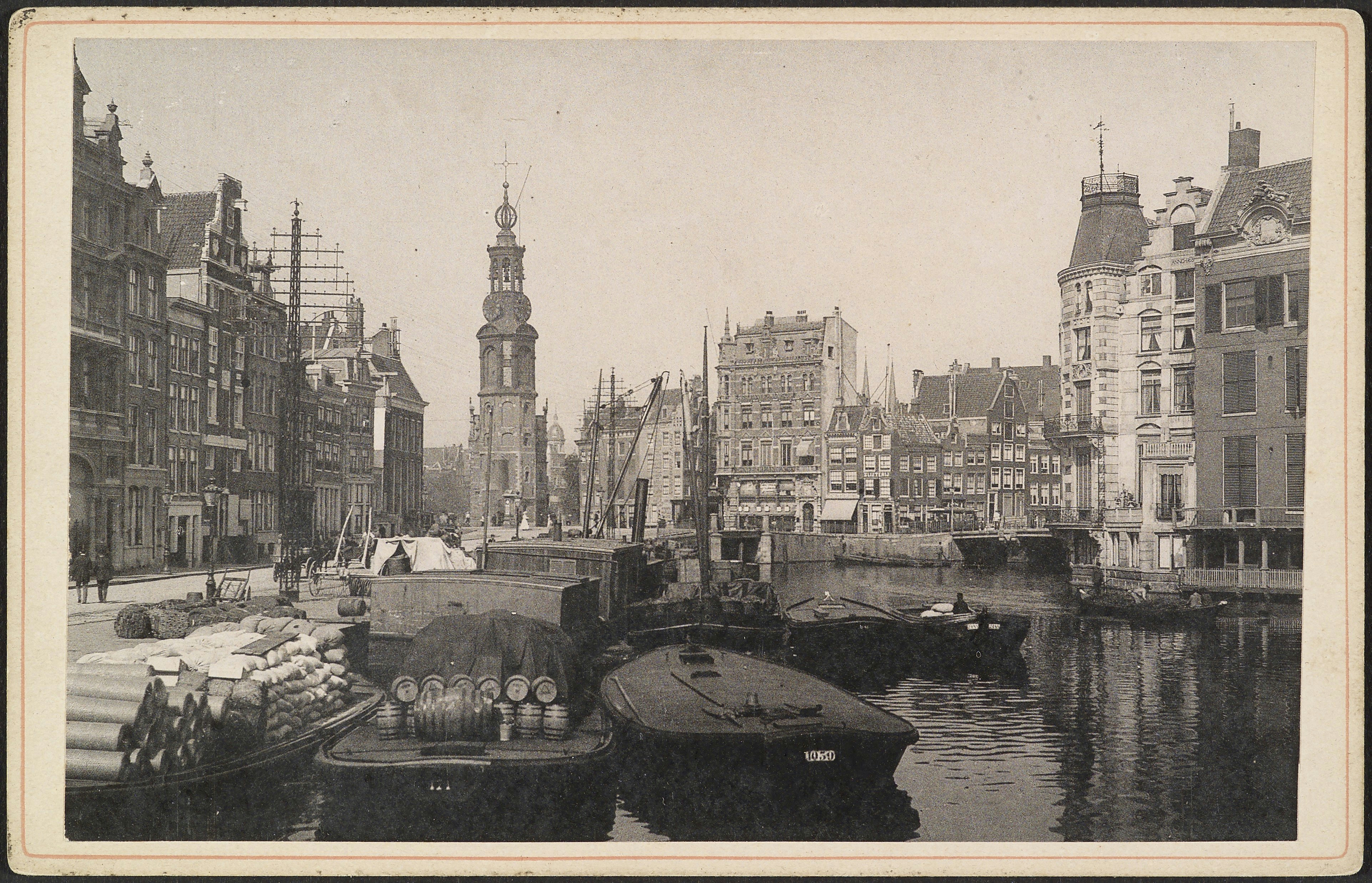
Houses around the Munttoren around 1880 seen from the east.
