= The Singles Album =

The Singles Album may refer to:

- The Singles Album (UB40 album) (1982)
- The Singles Album (Jimi Hendrix album) (1983)
- The Shirley Bassey Singles Album (1975)

== See also ==
- The Singles (disambiguation)
- The Singles Collection (disambiguation)
