= Muntplein, Amsterdam =

Square in Amsterdam, Netherlands

Muntplein
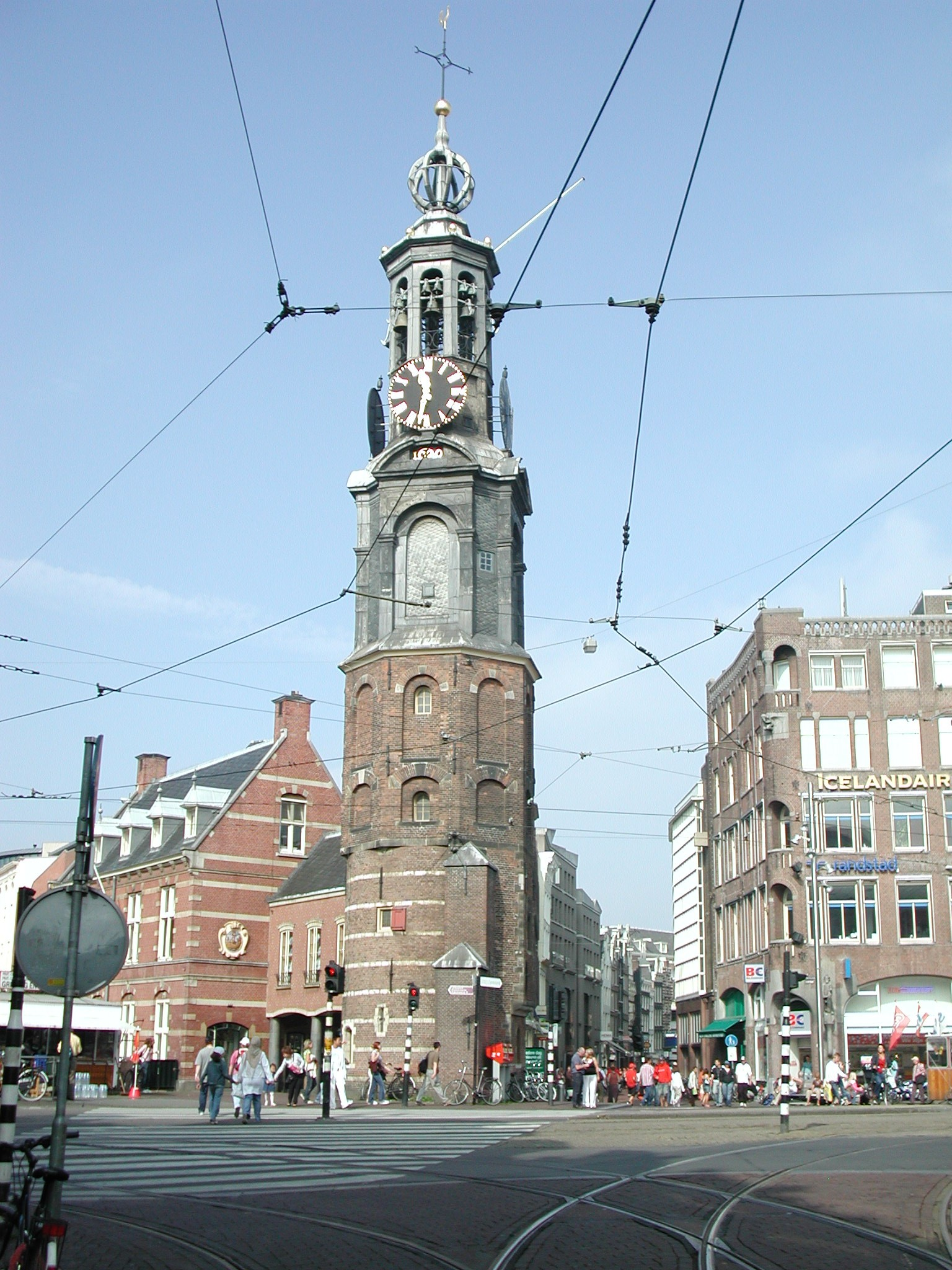
- Munttoren on Muntplein in 2005

- Location within Amsterdam
- Namesake: Munttoren
- Location: Centrum, Amsterdam, Netherlands
- Nearest metro station: Rokin
- Coordinates: 52°22′01″N 4°53′36″E

The Muntplein (Mint Square) is a square in the centre of Amsterdam. The square is in fact a bridge — the widest bridge in Amsterdam — that crosses the Singel canal at the point where it flows into the Amstel river. All bridges in Amsterdam are numbered, and the Muntplein carries the number 1.

Muntplein is named after the Munttoren (or simply Munt) tower that stands on this square. This tower was once part of one of the three main medieval city gates. In the 17th century, it temporarily served as a mint, hence the name. The guard house building attached to the tower is not the original medieval structure but a late 19th-century fantasy. An underpass was added to the building during a 1938–1939 renovation.

The name "Muntplein" dates from 1917. The square was originally known as Schapenplein ("sheep square") and, from 1877 to 1917, as Sophiaplein (after Queen Sophia, first wife of William III).

The square is a bustling intersection of six streets. It forms the southern end of the Kalverstraat shopping street and the major street Rokin. The eastern end of the floating flower market (Bloemenmarkt) along the Singel canal is directly south of the square. Six tram lines (4, 9, 14, 16, 24 and 25) stop at Muntplein, but only when travelling south.

The building on Muntplein at the intersection of the Kalverstraat and Rokin is an early design by prominent Dutch architect Hendrik Petrus Berlage.

== Photo gallery ==
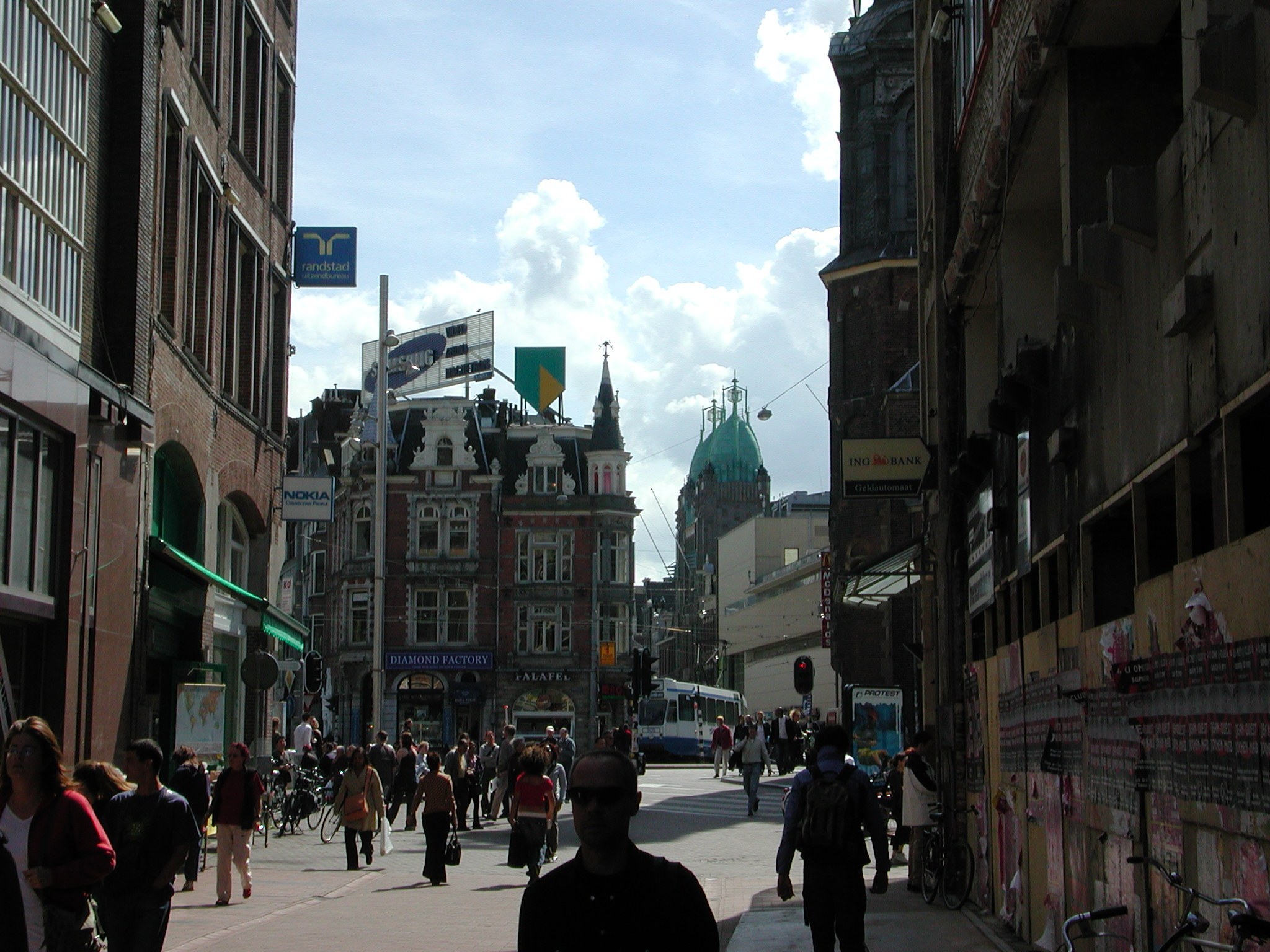
The Muntplein seen from the Kalverstraat shopping street

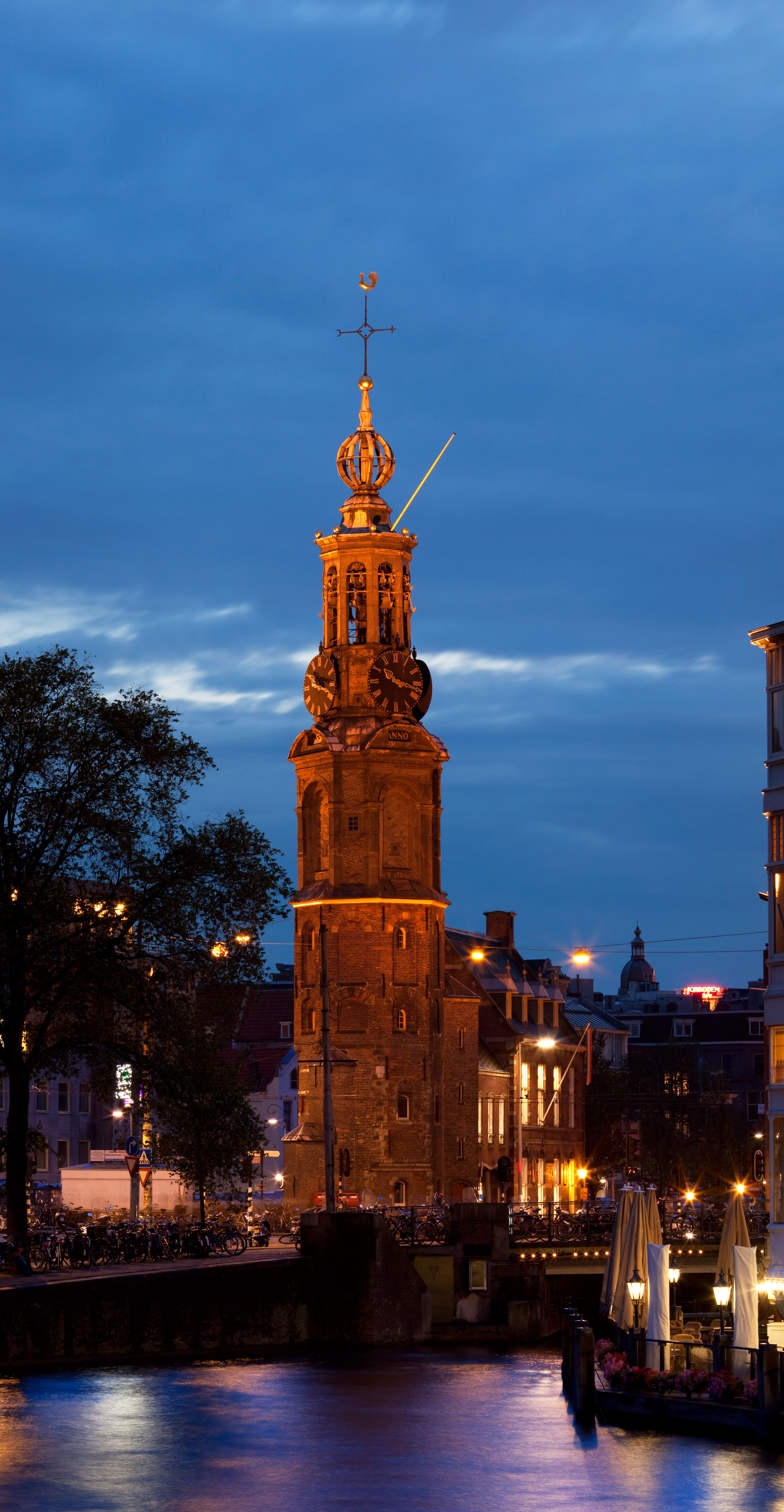
The Muntplein with Munttoren as seen from the river Amstel.

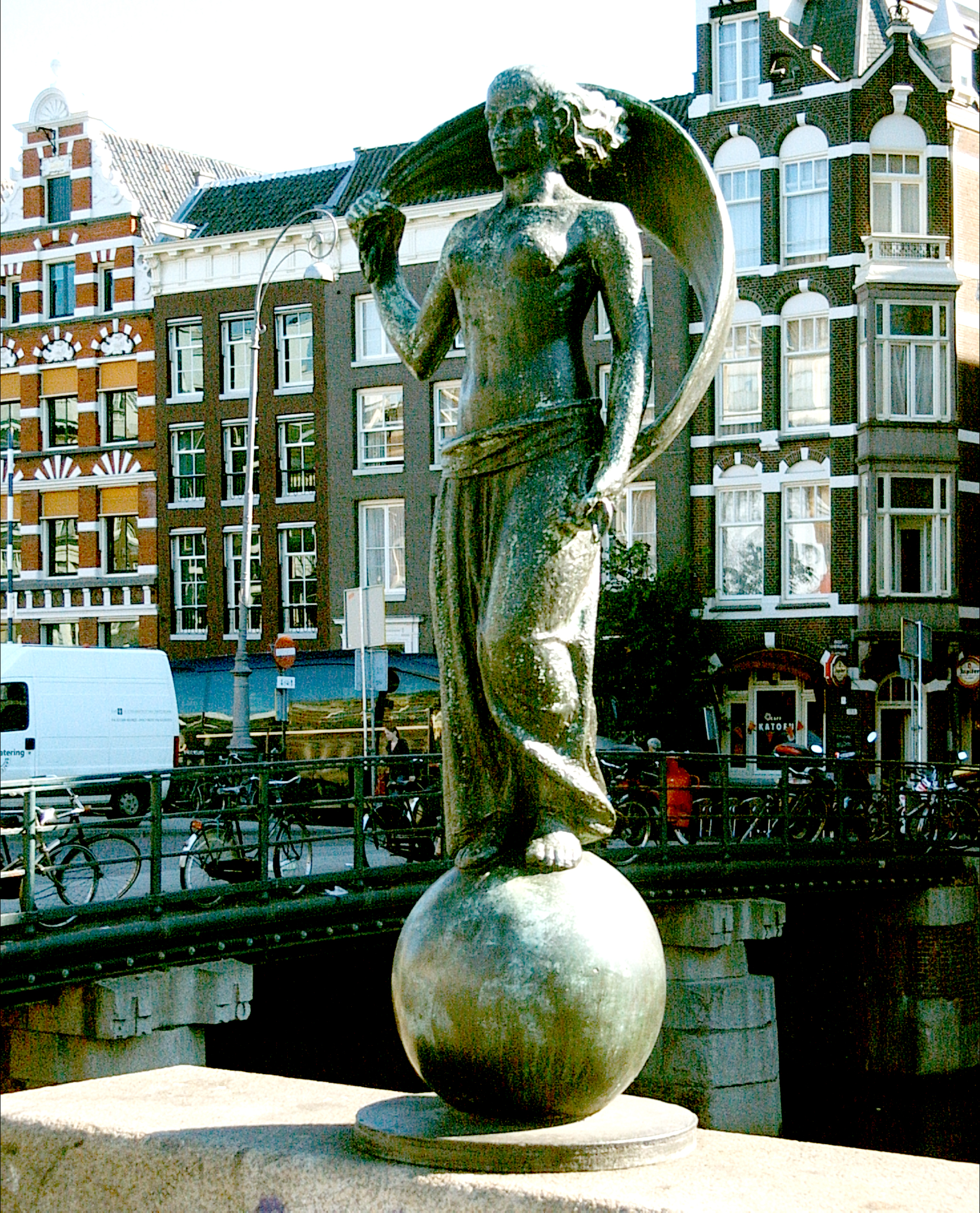
Statue of Lady Fortune on the Rokin near Muntplein

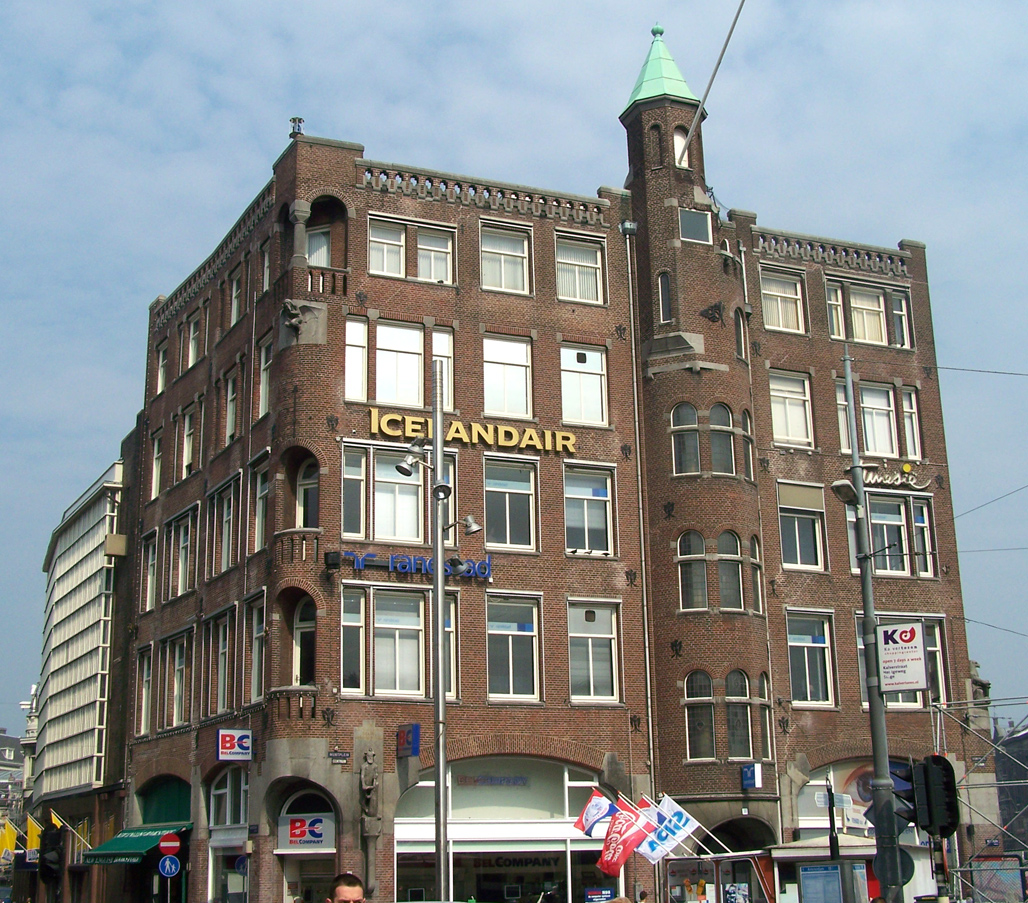
Building designed by Hendrik Petrus Berlage on Muntplein

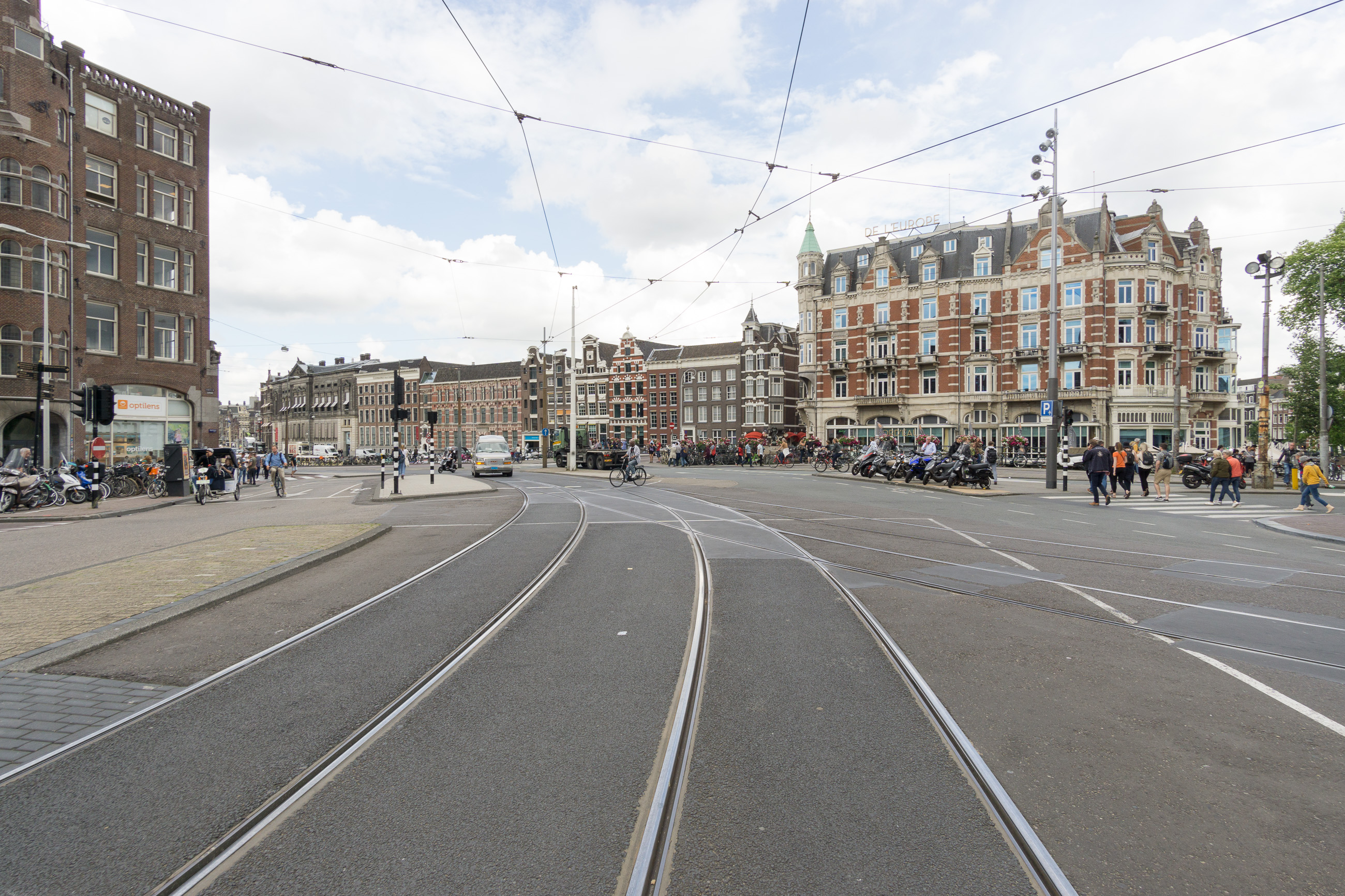
Wide view of tram tracks on Muntplein
