= Zingle =

Zingle is a surname. Notable people with the surname include:

- Axel Zingle (born 1998), French cyclist
- Romain Zingle (born 1987), Belgian cyclist

== See also ==
- Single (disambiguation)
- Zingel, a genus of fish
- Zingler, a surname
