= The Singles Collection =

The Singles Collection or similar may refer to:

- The Singles Collection (Apoptygma Berzerk album), 2003
- The Singles Collection (Britney Spears album), 2009
- The Singles Collection (Creedence Clearwater Revival album), 2009
- The Singles Collection (David Bowie album), 1993
- The Singles Collection (Jimi Hendrix album), 2003
- The Singles Collection (Shed Seven album), 2008
- The Singles Collection (Silversun Pickups album), 2014
- The Singles Collection (Spandau Ballet album), 1985
- The Singles Collection (The Specials album), 1991
- The Singles Collection (Spice Girls album), 2026 box set by the Spice Girls
- The Singles Collection (Terje Rypdal album), 1988
- Single Collection (Hitomi Yaida album), 2004
- Single Collection (Jun Shibata album), 2005
- Singles Collection (The Coral album), 2008
- The Singles Collection 1984/1990, 1990 album by Jimmy Somerville, Bronski Beat and The Communards
- The Singles Collection, Volume 1 and Singles Collection, Volume 2 albums by Dropkick Murphys
- The Singles Collection 2001–2011 by Gorillaz
- Utada Hikaru Single Collection Vol. 1, 2004 album by Hikaru Utada
- Utada Hikaru Single Collection Vol. 2, 2010 album by Hikaru Utada
- The Single Collection, 2002 album by HIM
- Original Single Kollektion, 1998 boxed set by Rammstein
- Singles Collection: The London Years, 1989 album by The Rolling Stones
- Overloaded: The Singles Collection, 2006 album by the Sugababes
- The Singles Collection 1981–1993, 1993 album by Kim Wilde
- A Singles Collection, an album by Marillion
- The Singles Collection 1965–1976, 2005 album by BZN
- The Singles Collection: 1959 to 1966, 2002 album by Doris Day
- The Singles Collection, 1994 album by Shakin' Stevens

== See also ==
- The Singles (disambiguation)
- The Singles Album (disambiguation)
