= Bloemenmarkt =

Flower market in Amsterdam

Coordinates: 52°22′0″N 4°53′31″E

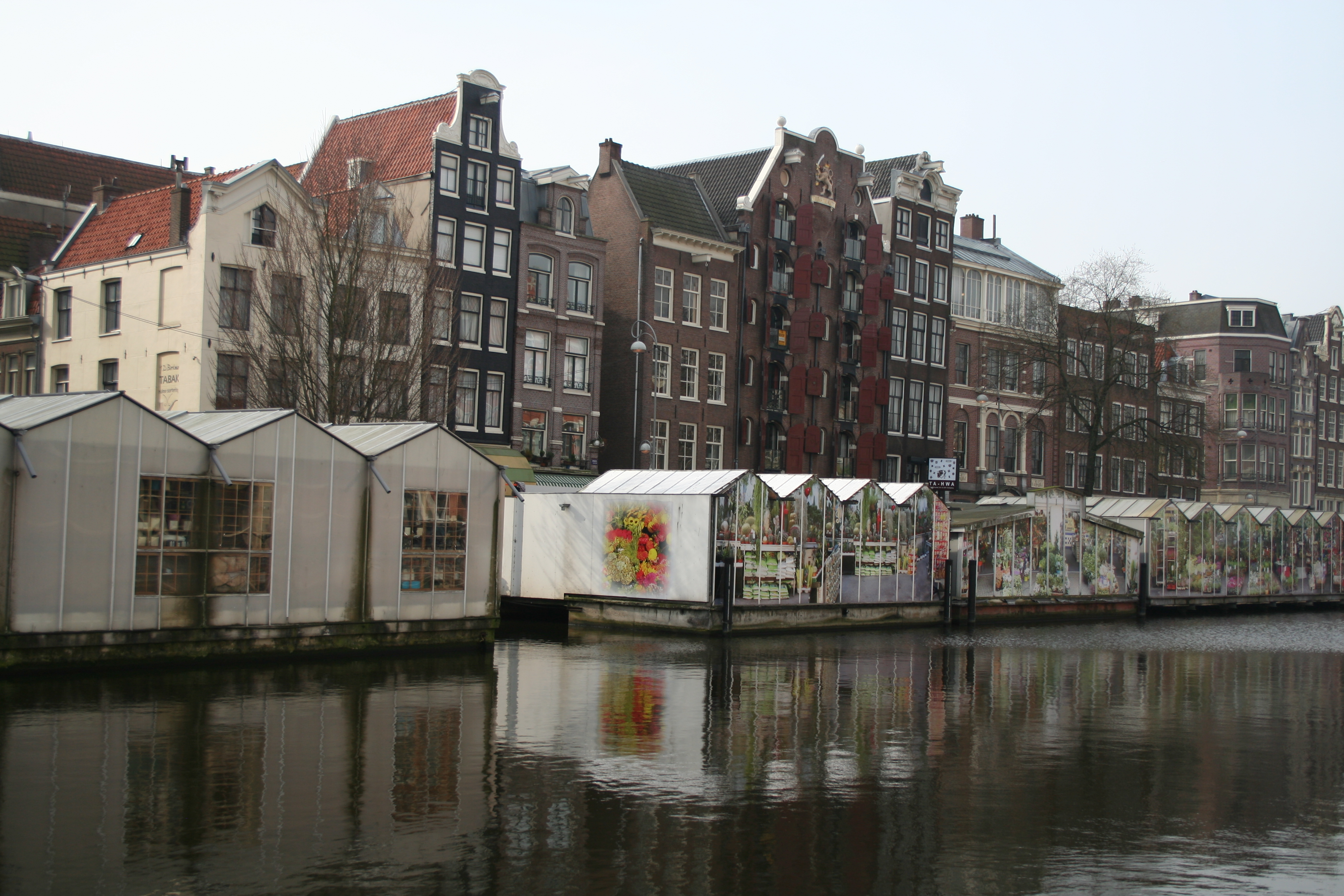
Bloemenmarkt flower stalls floating in the Singel canal

The Bloemenmarkt (Dutch pronunciation: [ˈbluməˌmɑr(ə)kt]) is the world's only floating flower market. Founded in 1862, it is sited in Amsterdam, Netherlands, on the Singel canal between Muntplein and Koningsplein in the city's southern canal belt. It has 15 souvenir and gift shops, with only a few still selling fresh flowers. Today, the market is one of the main suppliers of flower bulbs and tulip paraphernalia to tourists visiting Amsterdam. A 2019 survey found bulbs bought at the Bloemenmarkt rarely to never flower.

== Gallery ==
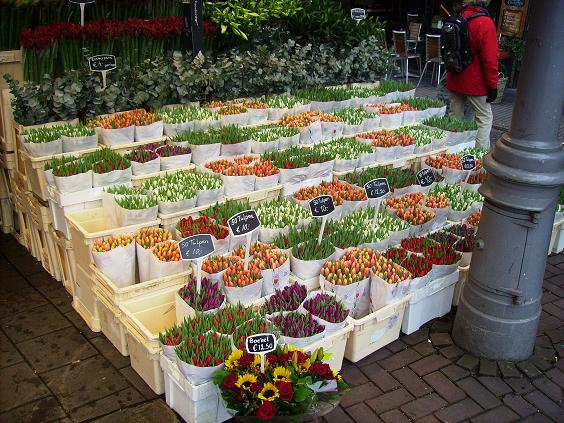

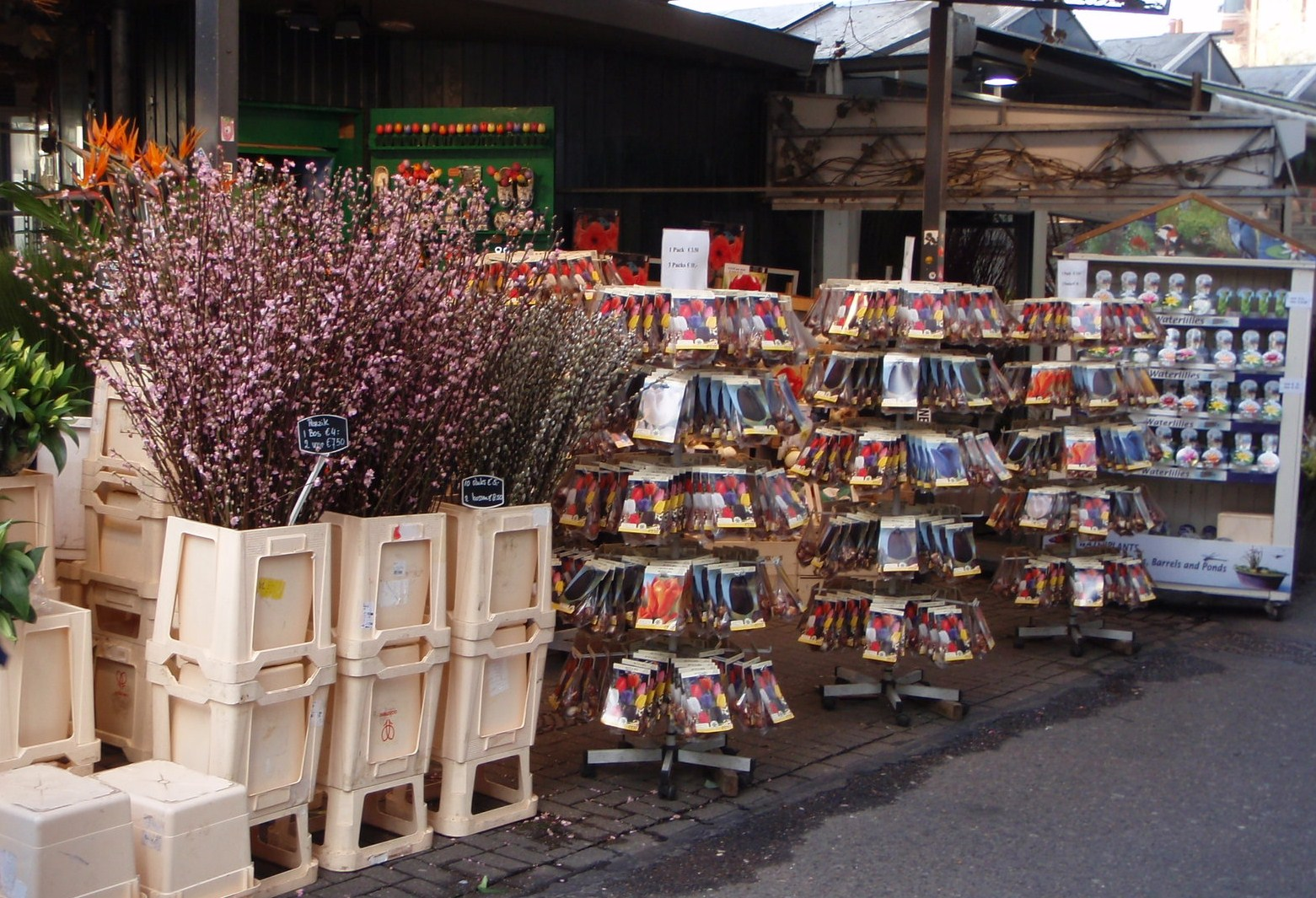

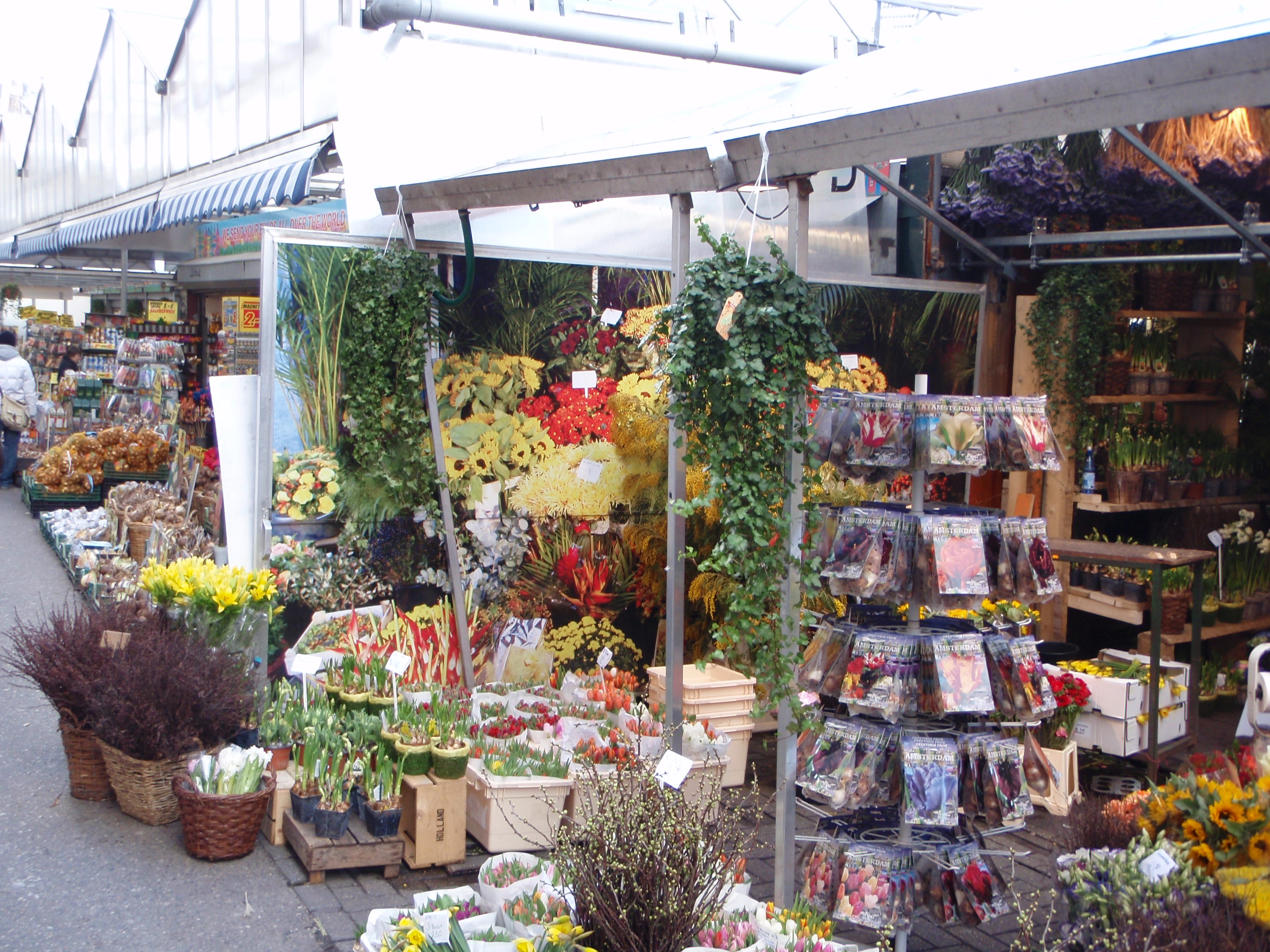

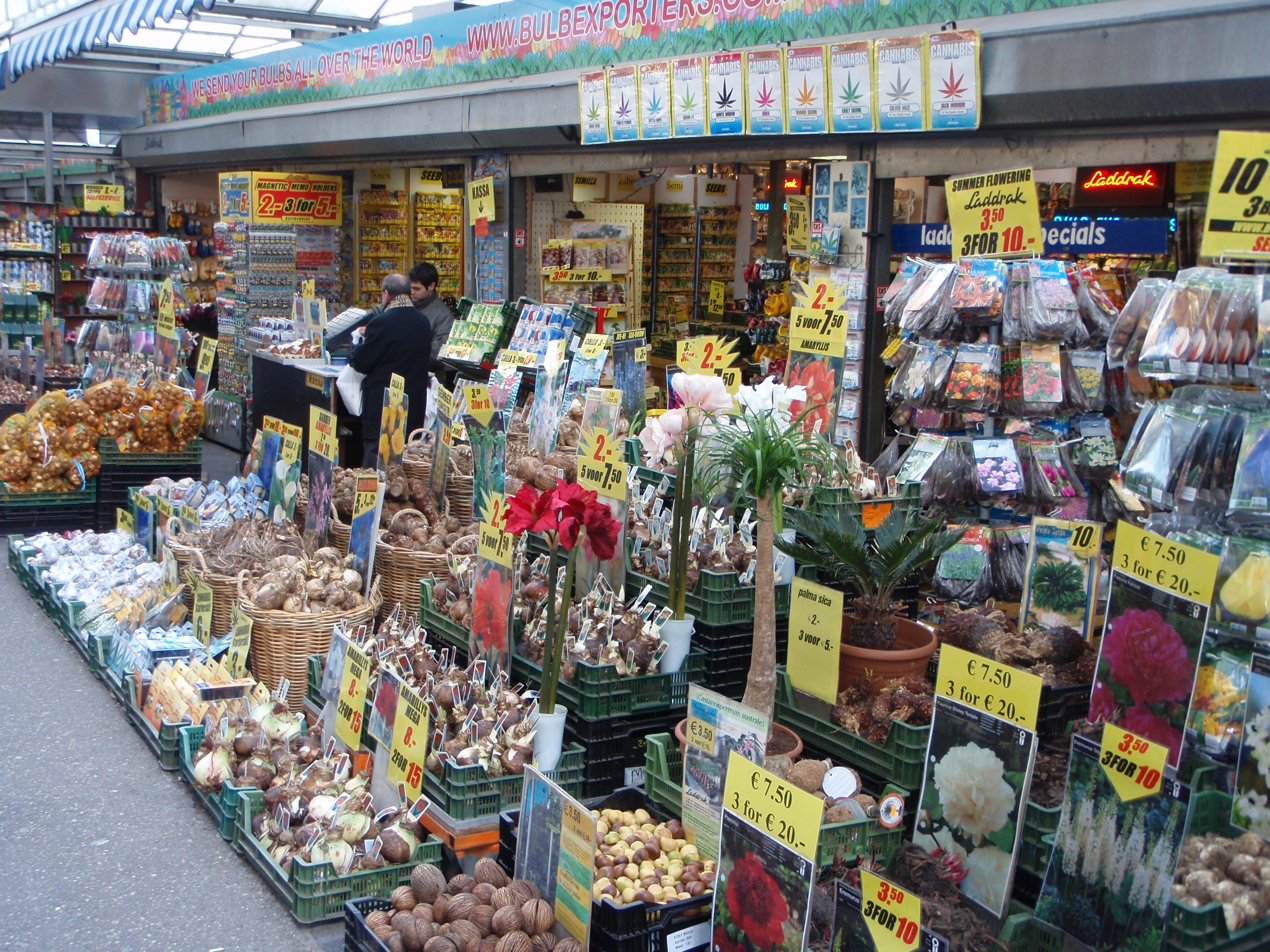
