= The Singel Bridge at the Paleisstraat in Amsterdam =

Painting by George Hendrik Breitner

- De Singelbrug bij de Paleisstraat in Amsterdam (Dutch)
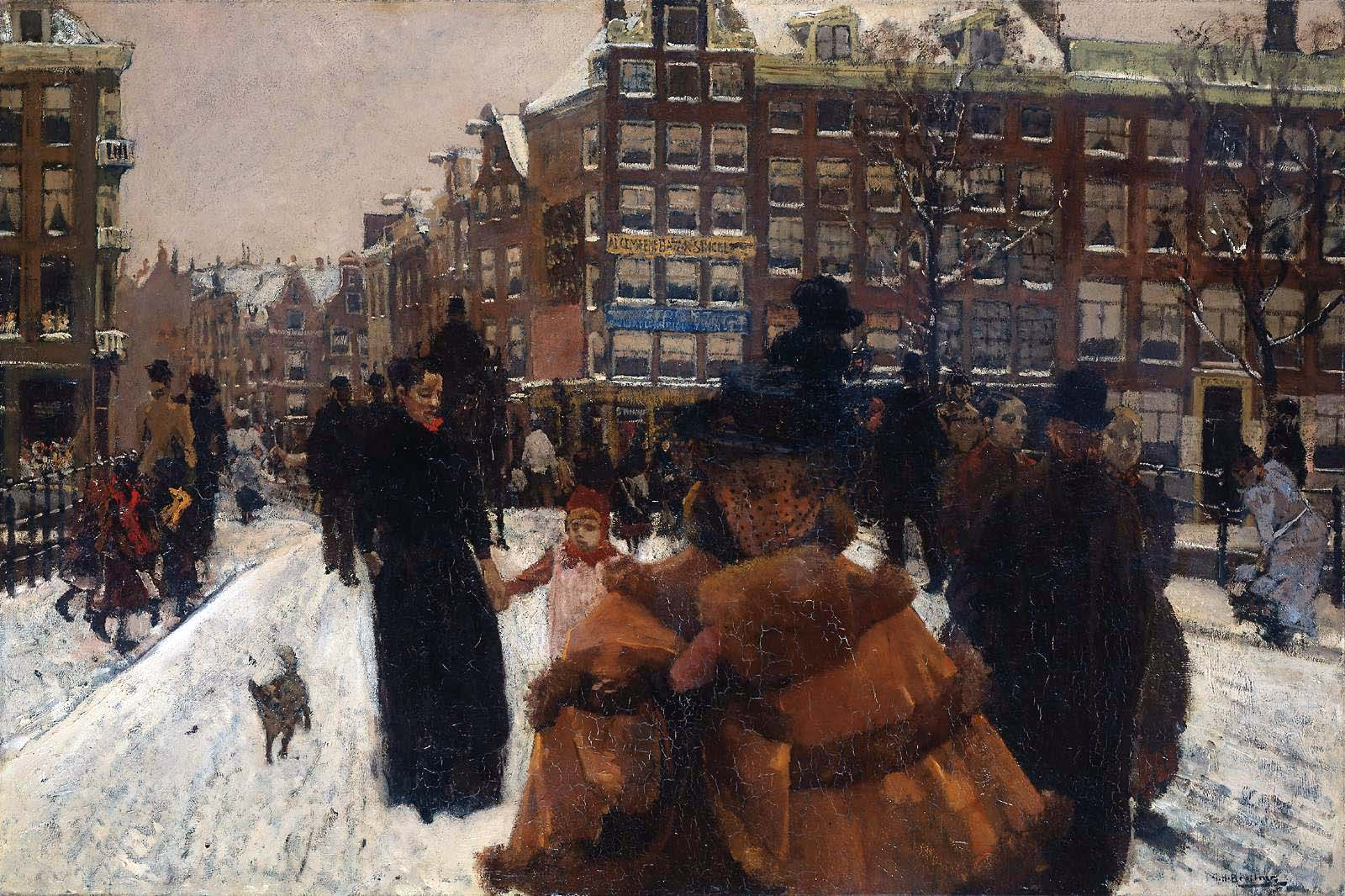
- Artist: George Hendrik Breitner
- Year: 1896 or 1898
- Medium: Oil on canvas
- Dimensions: 100 cm × 152 cm (39 in × 60 in)
- Location: Rijksmuseum; Amsterdam

The Singel Bridge at the Paleisstraat in Amsterdam (Dutch: De Singelbrug bij de Paleisstraat in Amsterdam) is an oil painting made by George Hendrik Breitner in 1896 or 1898. The painting shows people walking on the Singel Bridge at the Paleisstraat in Amsterdam. The work is oil on canvas of 100 cm (39 in) by 152 cm (60 in). The painting is in the collection of the Rijksmuseum in Amsterdam.

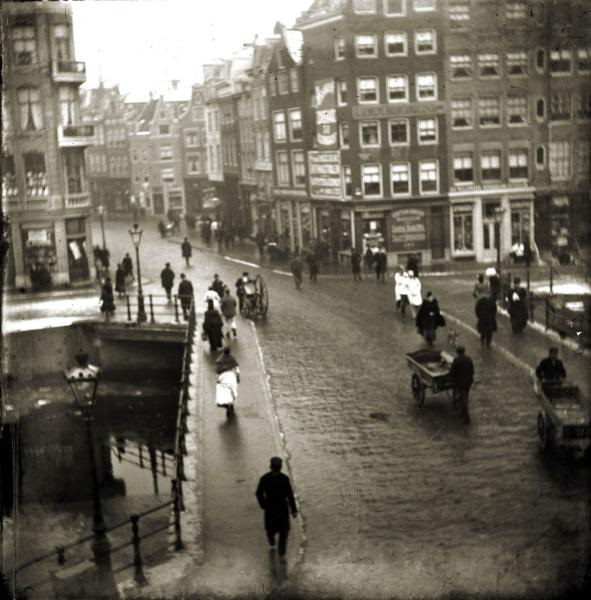
Photo of the Singel Bridge in 1893 by Breitner
