= Singles =

Singles are people not in a committed relationship.

Singles may also refer to:

== Film and television ==
- Singles (miniseries), a 1984 Australian television series
- Singles (1992 film), written and directed by Cameron Crowe
- Singles (2003 film), a South Korean film starring Jang Jin-young
- S1ngles, a Greek TV series
- Singles (TV series), a British sitcom produced from 1988 to 1991

== Music ==
- Single (music), a type of music release usually having only one to three songs
- Singles is a frequent title for a compilation album
- Singles (Alison Moyet album), 1995
- Singles (Deacon Blue album), 2006
- Singles (Future Islands album), 2014
- Singles (Jimmy Eat World album), 2000
- Singles (Luna Sea album), 1997
- Singles (Maroon 5 album), 2015
- Singles (New Order album), 2005
- Singles (Nirvana box set), 1995
- Singles: Original Motion Picture Soundtrack to the 1992 film
- Singles (Red Krayola album), 2004
- Singles (Suede album), 2003
- "Singles" (The Long Blondes album), an album by The Long Blondes, 2008
- Singles (The Smiths album), 1995
- Singles (Travis album), 2004
- Singles, an album by Despina Vandi, 2006
- Singles (The UA Years), an album by The Stranglers, 1989
- The Singles, an album by Corey Hart, 1992
- Singles (Fishbone album), 1993
- Singles 1–12, an album by The Melvins, 1997
- Singles (EP), an EP by Cameron Winters, 2024
- "Singles", a song by E-40 and Too $hort from the album History: Function Music, 2012
- "Singles", a song by Ibeyi from the album Ibeyi, 2015

== Gaming ==
- Singles: Flirt Up Your Life, a video game by Rotobee
- Singles (cards), individual trading cards sold at hobby stores

== Sports ==
- Men's singles or Women's singles in sports having one player per side, including;
  - tennis
  - badminton
  - pickleball
  - professional wrestling
  - racquetball
  - squash
  - table tennis
- match play in golf
- Single skating, a figure skating discipline commonly known as "singles"
- Single (baseball), when a batter reaches first base due to successful contact with the ball

== Food and drink ==
- Kenco Singles, a single-serve coffee brewing system
- Kraft Singles, a brand of individually-packaged cheese product slices
- Miniature (alcohol) - liquor bottles 50-60 mL

== Other uses ==
- Singles, Puy-de-Dôme, a commune of the Puy-de-Dôme département, France
- United States one-dollar bills, particularly when requesting change from, or implicitly comparing to, larger denomination bills

== See also ==
- Single (disambiguation)
- Singles match (disambiguation)
