= The Singles (Soft Cell album) =

Compilation album by Soft Cell
- Released: 1986
- Recorded: 1981–1984
- Genre: Synth-pop
- Length: 47:25
- Labels: Some Bizzare; BZLP/MC 3 / 830 708-2
- Producers: Mike Thorne / Daniel Miller; Soft Cell

Soft Cell chronology
This Last Night in Sodom (1984)	The Singles (1986)	Memorabilia – The Singles (1991)

Professional ratings
Review scores
Source	Rating
Allmusic	4.5/5 stars

The Singles was the first compilation album to be released by Soft Cell. The album was issued on vinyl, cassette and CD in 1986 and features all their singles, from the albums Non-Stop Erotic Cabaret, Non-Stop Ecstatic Dancing, The Art of Falling Apart and This Last Night in Sodom, with the exception of 'A Man Can Get Lost' (Original UK AA side to 'Memorabilia'), 'Where Did Our Love Go?' (Original UK AA side to 'Tainted Love') & 'Barriers' (Original UK AA side to Numbers') . The CD booklet included a November 1986 essay by Tony Mitchell.

== Reception ==
Dele Fadele of NME praised the earlier songs, saying, "It's on these seven salvos that their wilfully marred reworkings of Northern Soul themes and pioneering electro-jolts actually seethe and settle and change colour. Low technology classics is what they were: cod orchestral pieces in tow with a voice that fell sharply, rolled along on its edge and became disagreeable only when its momentum ran down."

== Track listing ==
All songs written by Marc Almond and David Ball except where noted.

1. "Memorabilia" - 4:50 Non-album single
2. "Tainted Love" (Ed Cobb) - 2:40 from Non-Stop Erotic Cabaret
3. "Bedsitter" - 3:36 from Non-Stop Erotic Cabaret
4. "Say Hello, Wave Goodbye" - 5:25 from Non-Stop Erotic Cabaret
5. "Torch" - 4:08 Non-album single
6. "Loving You, Hating Me" - 4:19 from The Art of Falling Apart
7. "What?" (H.B. Barnum) - 4:34 from Non Stop Ecstatic Dancing
8. "Where the Heart Is" - 4:32 from The Art of Falling Apart
9. "Numbers" - 4:56 from The Art of Falling Apart
10. "Soul Inside" - 4:29 from This Last Night in Sodom
11. "Down in the Subway" (Jack Hammer) - 3:26 from This Last Night in Sodom

== Notes ==
"Loving You, Hating Me" was never actually released in the UK as a single and only saw a promo release in the USA & Canada. It was not included on the vinyl version of the album.
