= Singel =

Street and canal in Amsterdam

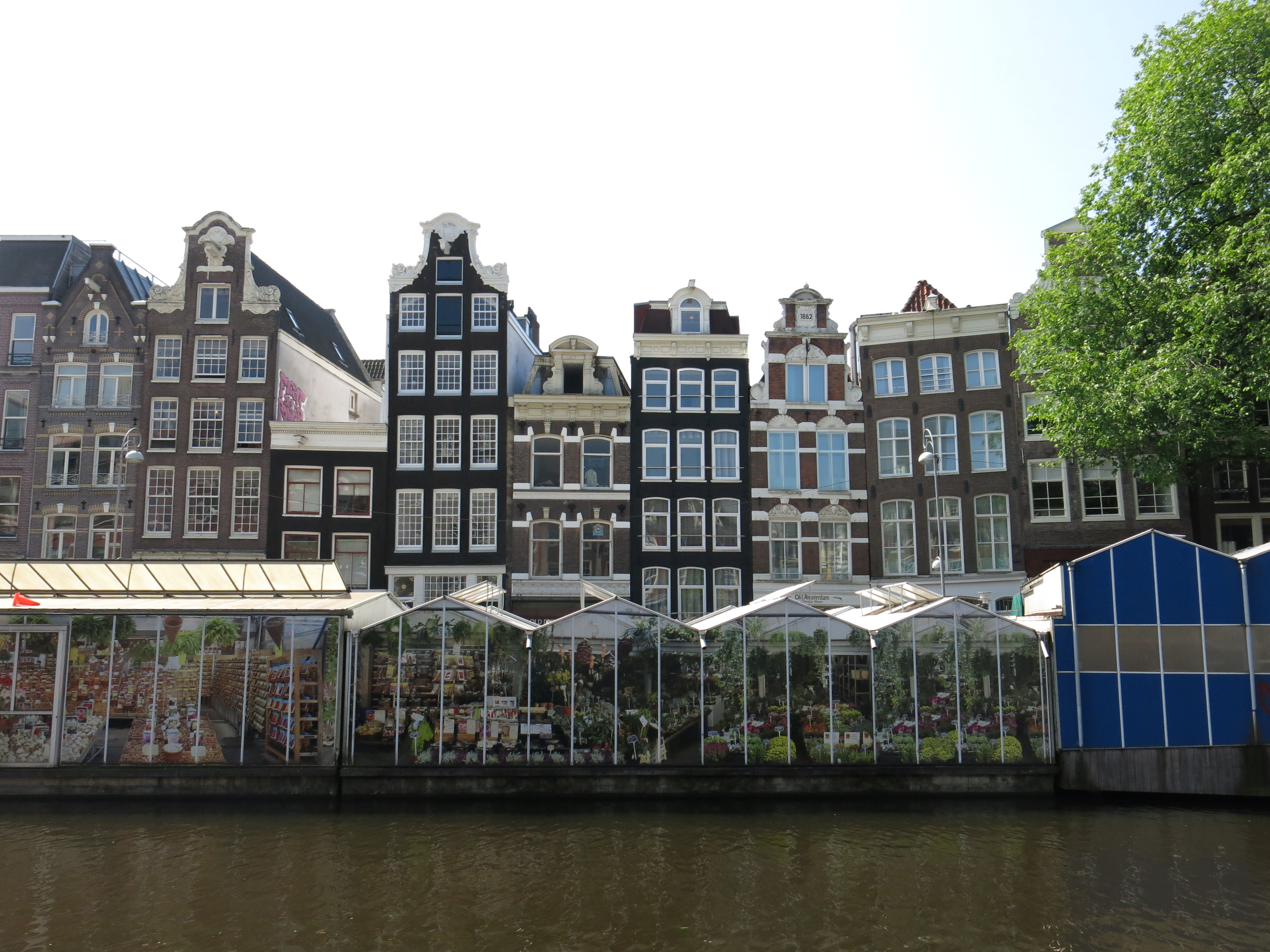
Stalls of the Bloemenmarkt (flower market) floating in the Singel.

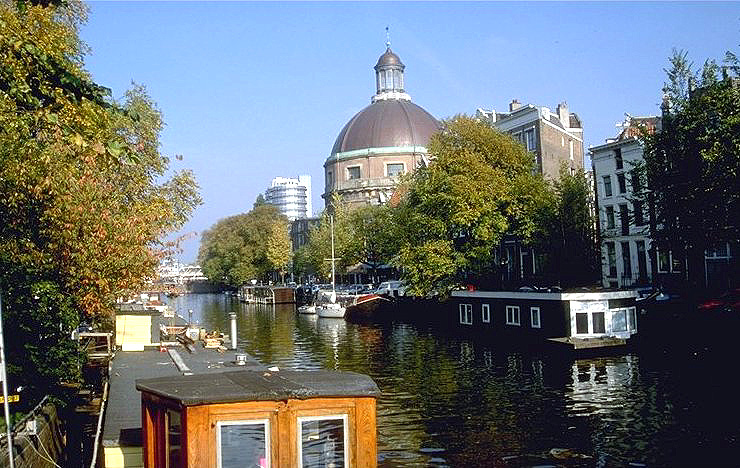
The Ronde Lutherse Kerk ("Round Lutheran Church").

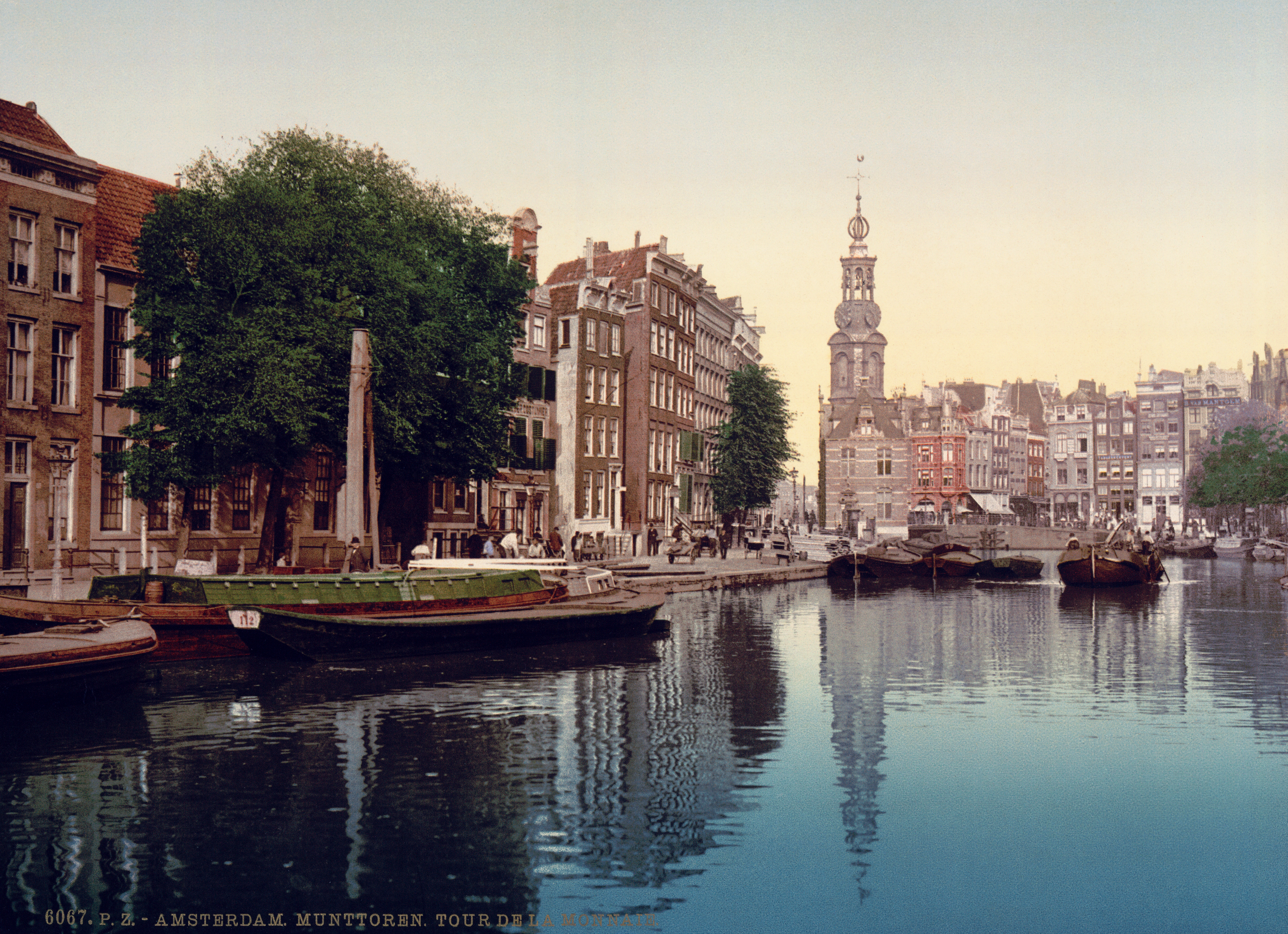
The Munttoren seen from the Singel, postcard from 1900.

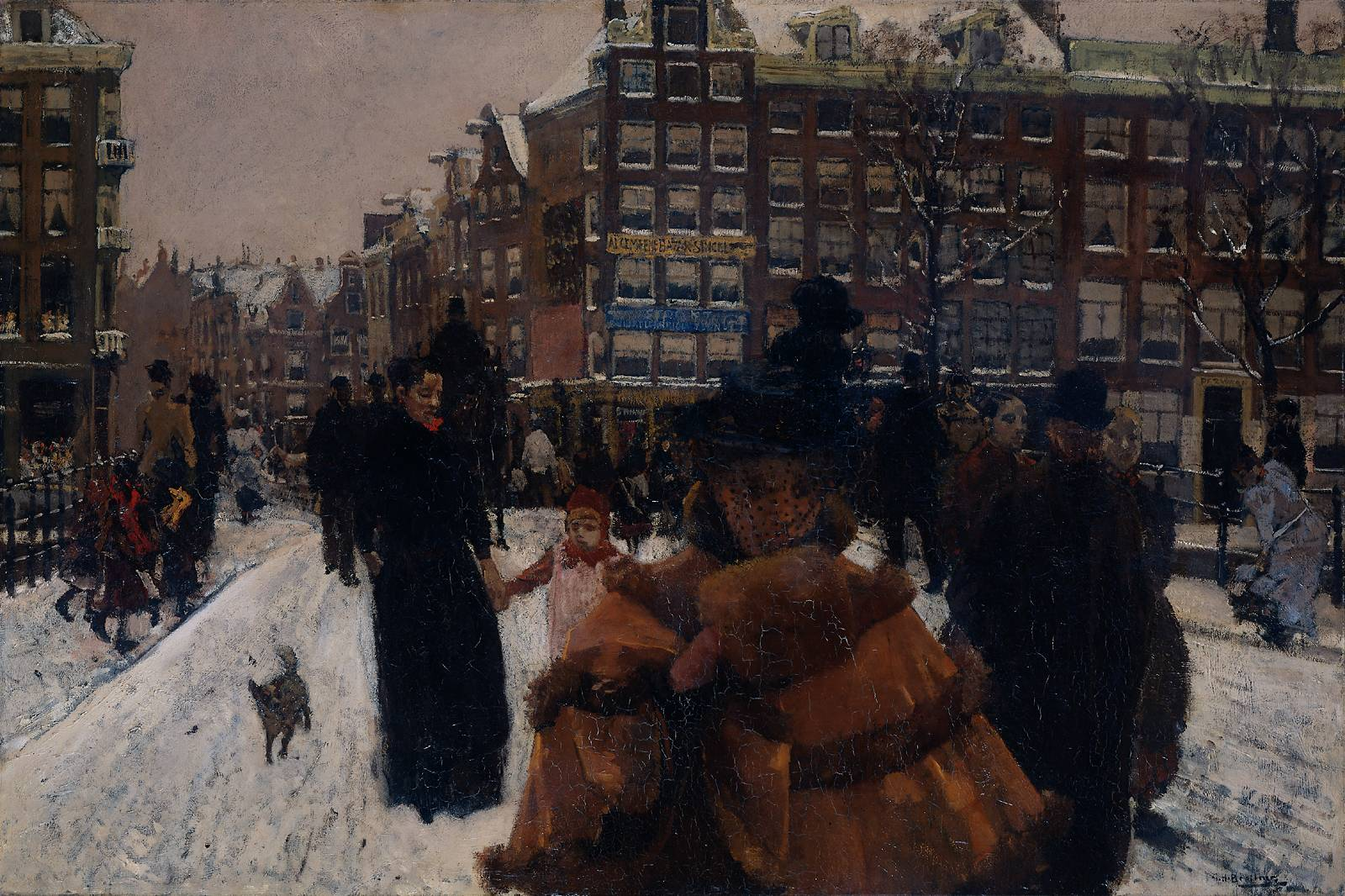
The Singel Bridge at the Paleisstraat in Amsterdam, painting by Breitner, c. 1897.

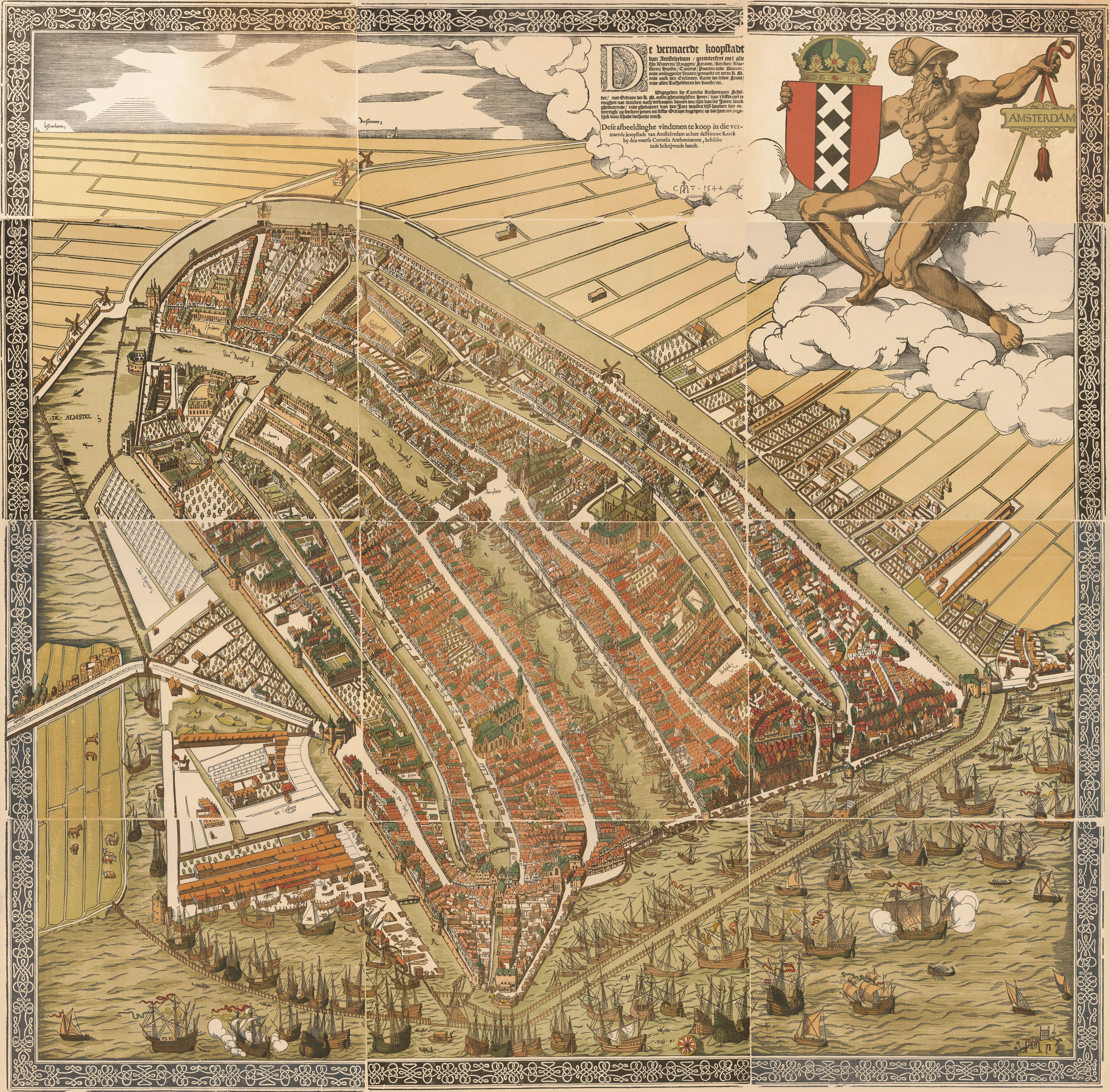
A bird's eye view of Amsterdam circa 1544, encircled by the Singel (right side), woodcut by Cornelis Anthonisz.

The Singel (Dutch pronunciation: [ˈsɪ.ŋəl]) is one of the canals of Amsterdam. The Singel encircled Amsterdam in the Middle Ages, serving as a moat around the city until 1585, when Amsterdam expanded beyond the Singel. The canal runs from the IJ bay, near the Central Station, to the Muntplein square, where it meets the Amstel river. It is now the inner-most canal in Amsterdam's semicircular ring of canals.

The canal should not be confused with the Singelgracht, which became the outer limit of the city during the Dutch Golden Age in the 17th century. Other Dutch towns also have ring-shaped canals named Singel. The name is related to the Dutch word omsingelen, "to surround", and comes ultimately from Latin cingulum, meaning "belt".

== Locations along the Singel ==
Amsterdam's famous flower market, Bloemenmarkt, is located along the Singel between Koningsplein and Muntplein squares. The market stalls are actually barges floating in the canal.

Part of the Singel has developed into a red-light district, with prostitutes offering their services from behind red-lit windows. The area, known as the Singelgebied, is located near Lijnbaanssteeg and Oude Nieuwstraat. Yab Yum, one of Amsterdam's most exclusive brothels until closed by the local authority in January 2008, was located at Singel 295.

The Singel is lined by many beautiful, richly decorated canal houses built during the Dutch Golden Age. Notable buildings along the canal include:

- A house said to be the narrowest in the world — only one meter wide (admittedly, this is the back of the house; the front is quite a bit wider), at Singel 7.
- De Dolphijn, at Singel 140–142, a monumental canalside house built in ca. 1600, once inhabited by Frans Banning Cocq, the central figure in Rembrandt's painting The Night Watch.
- The Oude Lutherse Kerk ("Old Lutheran Church"), at Singel 411, built in 1632–1633.
- The Ronde Lutherse Kerk ("Round Lutheran Church"), also known as Koepelkerk or Nieuwe Lutherse Kerk, built in 1668–1671.
- The library of the University of Amsterdam, at Singel 425.
- The Kalvertoren shopping center, between Koningsplein and Muntplein squares.
- The Munttoren tower, originally part of a gate in the medieval city walls, on Muntplein square, where the Singel meets the Amstel River.

The Haringpakkerstoren tower was part of Amsterdam's Medieval city defenses. The tower stood at the beginning of the Singel, near the IJ. It was demolished in 1829. The municipal government is currently considering a plan to rebuild the tower and adjacent houses. However, this plan remains highly controversial; opponents consider it in poor taste and a waste of money.

The Torensluis, built in 1648, is an arched and exceptionally wide bridge across the Singel. Now covered by cosy café terraces and a bust of Dutch writer Multatuli, the Torensluis is the oldest remaining bridge in Amsterdam, and also the widest bridge in Amsterdam (42 meters). The Jan Roodepoortstoren tower stood on one end of the bridge but was torn down in 1829. However, the tower's foundations remain part of the bridge. The entrance and barred windows of the tower's dungeon are still visible. The bridge, also known as Brug 9, crosses the Singel near Dam square, at Oude Leliestraat.

== Other names ==
Up until the 15th century, the Singel was known as the Stedegracht ("City Canal"). In the 17th century the canal was known for some time as Koningsgracht ("King's Canal"), in honor of King Henry IV of France, who was an important ally of the Dutch Republic during the early part of the 17th century. Part of the canal, stretching from Spui square to Lijnbaanssteeg / Blauwburgwal, was also known at one time as Londense Kaai ("London Quay") or Engelse Kaai ("English Quay") because many ships sailing between Amsterdam and London moored there.

== See also ==
- Binnenvestgracht, a related canal system in Leiden

== Sources ==
- Wikipedia.nl: Singel (Amsterdam)
- Amsterdam.nl (in Dutch)
- Vrienden van de Amsterdamse Binnenstad: Torensluis (in Dutch)
- Monumenten.nl: Haringpakkerstoren (in Dutch)
- Amsterdam Monumenten: Ronde Lutherse Kerk (in Dutch)
