= Single =

Single may refer to:

== Arts, entertainment, and media ==
- Single (music), a song release

=== Songs ===
- "Single" (Natasha Bedingfield song), 2004
- "Single" (New Kids on the Block and Ne-Yo song), 2008
- "Single" (William Wei song), 2016
- "Single", by Everything but the Girl from the album Walking Wounded, 1996
- "Single", by Meghan Trainer from the album Only 17
- "Single", from the musical The Weddinger Singer

=== Film ===
- #Single (film), an Indian Telugu-language romantic comedy film

== Sports ==
- Single (baseball), the most common type of base hit
- Single (cricket), point in cricket
- Single (football), Canadian football point
- Single-speed bicycle

== Transportation ==
- Single-cylinder engine, an internal combustion engine design with one cylinder, or a motorcycle using such engine
- Single (locomotive), a steam locomotive with a single pair of driving wheels
- As a verb: to convert a double-track railway to a single-track railway

== Other uses ==
- Single (mathematics) (1-tuple), a list or sequence with only one element
- Single person, a person who is not in a committed relationship
- Single precision, a computer numbering format that occupies one storage location in computer memory at a given address
- "Single", a slang term for a United States one-dollar bill
- A type of bet offered by UK bookmakers
- Kraft Singles, American processed cheese product

== See also ==
- Alone (disambiguation)
- Singel (disambiguation)
- Single-ended (disambiguation)
- Singles (disambiguation)
- Zingle, a surname
