= The Stooges discography =

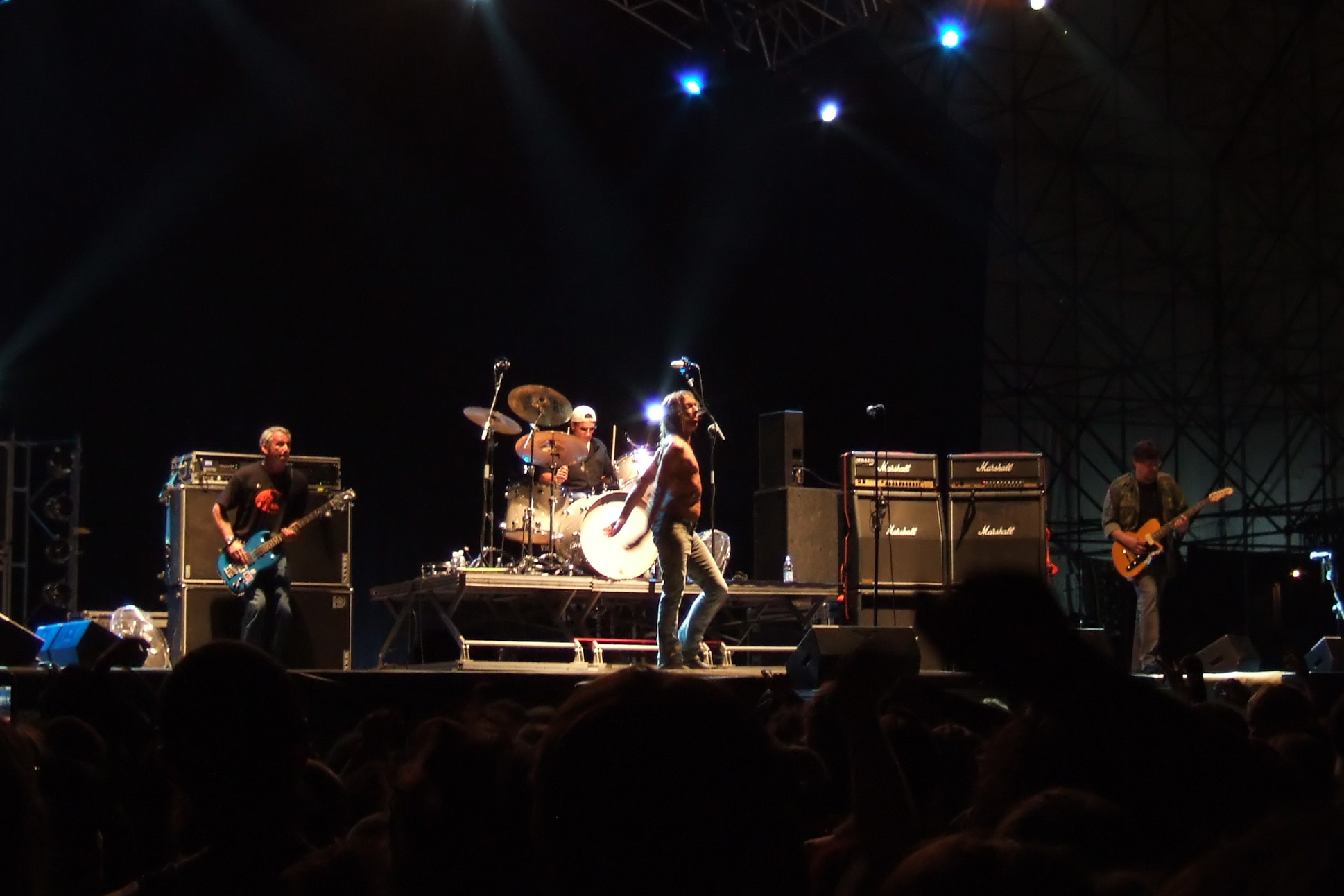
- The Stooges performing in Milan, Italy, on September 2, 2006
- Studio albums: 5
- Extended plays: 1
- Live albums: 14
- Compilation albums: 9
- Singles: 24
- Box sets: 5
- Guest appearances: 2

The discography of the Stooges—a Detroit, Michigan–based rock band founded by "The Godfather of Punk Music" Iggy Pop as singer, Ron Asheton as guitarist, Dave Alexander as bass-guitarist and Scott Asheton as drummer—currently consists of five studio albums, one EP, twenty-four singles, fourteen live albums, nine compilation albums and five box sets.

The Stooges' debut album The Stooges was released on August 5, 1969, in the United States, and one month later in the United Kingdom. The album reached number 106 on the Billboard 200. Almost one year later, on July 7, 1970, the band released their second album, Fun House, which did not chart on the Billboard 200, the UK Albums Chart, or any other international music album chart. In February 1973, the Stooges released their third album, Raw Power. It charted in the Billboard 200 at No. 182, in the UK at least at No. 44, and is the best charting album by the Stooges in the United Kingdom to date. After the release of Raw Power, the band (also known at the time as Iggy & the Stooges) announced their break-up. The Stooges reunited thirty-four years after their official dissolution, and released The Weirdness. Although the album was their second-best charting album in the United States, peaking at number 130, its overall commercial success is similar to that of the Stooges' first three albums.

The Stooges are described by critics as one of the key bands of punk music, in the genre described as "proto-punk", an early form of punk rock. Many musicians, particularly those in punk bands, cite the Stooges as a huge influence.

== Studio albums ==
Year	Title	Chart positions						Certifications
Year	Title	US	FRA	NLD	NZ	SWE	UK	Certifications
1969	The Stooges: Released: August 5, 1969 (US), September 1969 (UK); Label: Elektra	106	—	—	—	—	—	BPI: Silver
1970	Fun House: Released: July 7, 1970; Label: Elektra	—	167 (Note: Fun House did not chart in France until 2005.)	—	—	—	—	
1973	Raw Power: as Iggy and the Stooges; Released: February 7, 1973 (US), June 1973 (UK); Label: Columbia	182	138	—	20 (Note: Raw Power did not chart in New Zealand until 1977.)	—	44 (Note: Raw Power did not chart in the UK until 1977.)	BPI: Gold
2007	The Weirdness: Released: March 6, 2007; Label: Virgin	130	53	37	—	35	81	
2013	Ready to Die: as Iggy and the Stooges; Released: April 30, 2013; Label: Fat Possum	96	36	—	—	49	77	

== EPs ==
Year	Title
2005	Extended Play: Released: May 30, 2005; Label: Easy Action

== Live albums ==
Year	Title
1976	Metallic K.O.: Label: Skydog
1988	Live at the Whiskey a Go-Go: Label: Revenge
1995	Open Up and Bleed: Label: Bomp! (cat# BCD 4051)
1997	California Bleeding: Label: Bomp! (cat# BCD 4069)
2000	Double Danger: Label: Bomp! (cat# BCD 4076)
2000	Michigan Palace: Label: Bomp! (cat# BCD 4079)
2003	Live in Detroit: Label: Music Video Distributors (MVD)
2005	Telluric Chaos: Released: May 3, 2005; Label: Skydog
2007	Escaped Maniacs: Released: 2007; Label: ABC Entertainment and Charley Films
2009	You Don't Want My Name... You Want My Action: Label: Easy Action
2010	Have Some Fun: Live at Unganos: Label: Rhino
2011	Raw Power Live: In the Hands of the Fans: Label: Music Video Distributors (MVD)
2011	Sadistic Summer Live 2011: Label: Concert Live
2020	Live at Goose Lake, August 8th, 1970: Label: Third Man Records
2022	The Stooges – A Fire of Life: Label: Easy Action

== Compilations ==
Year	Title
1993	Rough Power: Label: Bomp! (cat# BCD 4049); Notes: Original mixes of Raw Power 10/72; complete Detroit WABX broadcast, early 1973; 3 more mixes, 11/28/72.
1997	Year of the Iguana: Label: Bomp! (cat# BCD 4063); Notes: Sampler with unreleased and alternate versions (CD only)
1998	Your Pretty Face Is Going to Hell: Label: (1995 UK) Golden Years (cat# gy008) / (1998 US) Snapper (cat# 156002) / Original Masters; Notes: 1 radio ad for live show; 6 outtakes; 4 tracks from rehearsal tapes; 2 tracks from WABX broadcast, early 1973.
2001	Wild Love: the Detroit Rehearsals and More: Label: Bomp! (cat# BCD 4083)
2006	Original Punks: Label: Music Club Deluxe
2008	Gimme Some Skin: Label: Get Back
2009	More Power: Label: Cleopatra; Notes: 2 CDs (also on vinyl with limited songs)
2016	Playlist: The Best of the Stooges: Label: Elektra
2017	Music from the Film Gimme Danger: Label: Rhino; Notes: Soundtrack to the documentary film

== Box sets ==
Year	Title
1991	Night of Destruction: Label: Revenge; Notes: Limited to 2,000 copies. 6-cd set of rare tracks
1999	1970: The Complete Fun House Sessions: Label: Rhino
2005	Heavy Liquid: Label: Easy Action
2020	Fun House (50th Anniversary Deluxe Edition): Label: Rhino; Notes: Limited to 1,970 copies. 18 x LP set.
2020	You Think You're Bad, Man? – The Road Tapes 1973/74: Label: Cherry Red; 5 concerts including the full Metallic K.O final Show.

== Other appearances ==
=== Studio ===
- "You Better Run" from Sunday Nights: The Songs of Junior Kimbrough by various artists 2005 (US) Fat Possum

=== Guest appearances ===
- Skull Ring by Iggy Pop November 4, 2003 (US)
  November 2003 (UK) Virgin Records

== Singles ==
- "I Wanna Be Your Dog" mono version b/w "I Wanna Be Your Dog" stereo version (Elektra, 1969), for promotional use only
- "I Wanna Be Your Dog" b/w "1969" (Elektra, 1969), US
- "1969" b/w "Real Cool Time" (Elektra, 1969)), France
- "I Wanna Be Your Dog" b/w "Ann" (Vedette, 1969), Italy
- "Down on the Street" b/w "1970", (Elektra, 1970), US, France and Japan
- "Search and Destroy" mono version b/w "Search and Destroy" stereo version (Sony, 1973), for promotional use only
- "Shake Appeal" b/w "Search and Destroy" (Sony, 1973), both in playback versions coming with Jesse Ed Davis' tracks "She's A Pain" b/w "Keep Me Coming"
- "Raw Power" b/w "Search and Destroy" (Sony, 1973), Japan
- "I Got a Right" b/w "Gimme Some Skin" (Siamese, 1977), US
- "I'm Sick of You" b/w "Tight Pants" b/w "Scene of the Crime" (Bomp!, 1977), US
- "Johanna" b/w "Purple Haze" (Revenge, 1988), France
- "My Girl Hates My Heroin" b/w "How It Hurts" (Revenge, 1989), France
- "She Creatures of Hollywood Hills" b/w "Untitled Scratch 5", a version of "Till the End of the Night", (sold with the paper "Spiral Scratch", 1989), UK
- "T.V. Eye" (Live version) b/w "What You Gonna Do?" (Revenge, 1990), France
- "Till the End of the Night" b/w "I'm Sick of You" (Revenge, 1990), France
- "She Creatures of Hollywood Hills" b/w "Tight Pants" b/w "Jesus Loves the Stooges" (Revenge, 1990), France
- "Open Up and Bleed" (Studio version) b/w "I Got a Right" b/w "Gimme Some Skin" (Revenge, 1990), France
- "Nowhere" (a version of "Born in a Trailer") b/w "Consolation Prizes" b/w "Johanna" (Revenge, 1990), France
- "I'm Sick of You" b/w "Tight Pants" b/w "She Creatures of Hollywood Hills" (Melodia, Soviet Union), 1990
- "I Got a Right" b/w "Gimme Some Skin" (Bomp!, 1990), US
- "I Got Nothing" b/w "Cock in My Pocket" (Jungle, 1998), UK
- "Gimme Danger" b/w "Heavy Liquid" (Munster, 1999), Spain
- "Search and Destroy" b/w "Penetration" (Sundazed reissue, 2005)
- "Free & Freaky" (Virgin, 2007)
