= Have Some Fun: Live at Ungano's =

Live album by The Stooges
- Released: November 15, 2010
- Recorded: August 17, 1970
- Venue: Ungano's, New York City, New York
- Genre: Garage rock; hard rock; proto-punk
- Length: 39:43
- Label: Rhino
- Producer: Robert Matheu

The Stooges chronology
The Weirdness (2007)	Have Some Fun: Live at Ungano's (2010)	Raw Power Live: In the Hands of the Fans (2011)

Have Some Fun: Live at Ungano's is a live album by the rock band The Stooges. It was originally recorded on August 17, 1970 as an audience recording by Danny Fields, who had signed the band in 1968.

== History ==
After a performance at the Goose Lake Music Festival, at which he was inebriated and unable to play properly, original bassist Dave Alexander, was replaced by roadie Zeke Zettner. A short while later Billy Cheatham, who was the band's road manager at the time as well as a former bandmate of Asheton's, joined on rhythm guitar. With the new line-up, they scheduled three nights at a Manhattan club called Ungano's to celebrate their new album, Fun House, being released the previous month. Danny Fields, who signed the band, was in the audience and recorded their set on the opening night, which included most of the songs from their new album and a new composition titled "Have Some Fun". According to eye-witnesses, the club was packed that night and included the attendance of jazz musician Miles Davis and blues guitarist Johnny Winter. Afterwards, Davis said that "the Stooges are original, they've got spirit.” Later that night the Stooges took the stage again around 2:35 AM, and played a briefer set considering the club closed at 3:00. The group started jamming while Iggy sat on the stage floor and began telling the story of his childhood, lamenting about being ignored, and misunderstood.

== Track list ==
All tracks are written by The Stooges, except where noted.

No.	Title	Writer(s)	Length
1.	"Going to Ungano's"		1:47
2.	"Loose"		3:14
3.	"Down on the Street"		4:24
4.	"T.V. Eye"		4:18
5.	"Dirt"		6:05
6.	"1970"		5:55
7.	"Fun House"		3:21
8.	"Have Some Fun" / "My Dream Is Dead"	Iggy Pop, Ron Asheton, Scott Asheton	10:39

Original studio versions of tracks 2–7 are available on The Stooges' second (studio) album Fun House released on July 7, 1970.

== Personnel ==
- Iggy Pop – vocals
- Scott Asheton – drums
- Ron Asheton – lead guitar
- Bill Cheatham – rhythm guitar
- Zeke Zettner – bass
- Steve Mackay – tenor saxophone
