= Gimme Danger =

2016 film

- Theatrical release poster
- Directed by: Jim Jarmusch
- Written by: Jim Jarmusch
- Produced by: Carter Logan; Fernando Sulichin; Rob Wilson
- Starring: Iggy Pop; Ron Asheton; Scott Asheton; James Williamson; Steve Mackay; Mike Watt; Kathy Asheton; Danny Fields
- Cinematography: Tom Krueger
- Edited by: Affonso Gonçalves; Adam Kurnitz
- Production companies: Low Mind Films; New Element
- Distributed by: Amazon Studios; Magnolia Pictures
- Release dates: May 19, 2016 (Cannes); October 28, 2016 (United States)
- Running time: 108 minutes
- Country: United States
- Language: English
- Box office: $532,347

Gimme Danger is a 2016 American documentary film directed by Jim Jarmusch about the band the Stooges. It was shown in the Midnight Screenings section at the 2016 Cannes Film Festival. The film was released by Amazon Studios and Magnolia Pictures on October 28, 2016.

== Overview ==
The film follows the rise, fall and reunion of the Stooges, formed in Ann Arbor, Michigan in the 1967 by singer Iggy Pop, bassist Dave Alexander, and brothers Ron Asheton and Scott Asheton on guitar and drums respectively. Guitarist James Williamson eventually joined the band, with Ron Asheton switching to bass after Alexander was fired.

The band found little success during the first phase of their career, recording three albums that did not sell as well as their record companies expected, and performing for audiences that were largely indifferent or hostile. They broke up in 1974, and the band members went their separate ways with vocalist Pop establishing a moderately successful solo career. In time, the Stooges proved highly influential on the development of punk rock in the 1970s.

The Stooges' original lineup reformed in 2003, with bassist Mike Watt replacing the late Alexander. Ron Asheton died in 2009, and Williamson rejoined the band for their fifth and final album.

== Development and production ==
Jarmusch began working on the documentary almost a decade prior to the film's release. The project began after Osterberg expressed that if a film were to be made about The Stooges, he would prefer Jarmusch to make it.

Gimme Danger mixes archival photos and footage and cutout style animation alongside reunion-era interviews with the surviving band members and footage of their 2010 induction into the Rock and Roll Hall of Fame. The documentary is titled after a song on the 1973 Raw Power album.

== Release ==
In April 2016, Amazon Studios acquired distribution rights to the film. with Magnolia Pictures co-distributing the film. The film had its world premiere at the Cannes Film Festival on May 19, 2016. It also screened at the Toronto International Film Festival on September 8, 2016. and the New York Film Festival on October 5, 2016. The film was released on October 28, 2016.

== Critical reception ==
Gimme Danger received positive reviews from film critics. It holds an approval rating of 95% on review aggregator website Rotten Tomatoes, based on 100 reviews, with an average rating of 7/10. On Metacritic, the film holds a rating of 72 out of 100, based on 23 critics.
