= The Idiot (album) =

1977 studio album by Iggy Pop

Studio album by Iggy Pop
- Released: March 18, 1977
- Recorded: June–August 1976
- Studios: Château d'Hérouville (Hérouville); Musicland (Munich)
- Genres: Art rock; punk rock; post-punk
- Length: 38:49
- Label: RCA Victor
- Producer: David Bowie

Iggy Pop chronology
The Idiot (1977)	Lust for Life (1977)

Singles from The Idiot
- 1. "Sister Midnight" Released: February 1977; 2. "China Girl" Released: May 1977

The Idiot is the debut solo studio album by the American musician Iggy Pop, released on March 18, 1977, through RCA Records. It was produced by David Bowie and primarily recorded at the Château d'Hérouville in Hérouville, France. The album followed the break-up of Pop's band the Stooges in 1974 and a period of drug addiction for both Pop and Bowie, after which the two moved to Europe in an effort to kick their addictions.

Described by Pop as "a cross between James Brown and Kraftwerk", The Idiot marks a departure from the proto-punk of the Stooges to a more subdued, mechanical sound with electronic overtones. Recording for it began at the château in June 1976 and continued into July. Further sessions took place at Musicland Studios in Munich in August. Bowie composed most of the music and contributed a major portion of the instrumentation. Pop wrote most of the lyrics in response to the music Bowie was creating. The album's title was taken from Fyodor Dostoevsky's novel of the same name, while Erich Heckel's painting Roquairol inspired its artwork.

After the album was completed, Bowie began recording his next album Low, which features a sound similar to The Idiot. Low was released in January 1977 and was a commercial success, compelling RCA Records to release The Idiot two months later. Upon its release, the album received divided, albeit largely positive reviews from music critics, many of whom noted a change in musical tone from Pop's earlier work with the Stooges. It charted in the US, the UK, and Australia. It was accompanied by the release of two singles, "Sister Midnight" and "China Girl", in February and May 1977, respectively; Bowie later issued his own version of "China Girl" as a single in 1983.

Pop supported The Idiot with a tour in March and April 1977, with Bowie as his keyboardist. Afterward, the two collaborated again on Pop's second studio album, Lust for Life (1977). Retrospectively, The Idiot has continued to be received positively, with many noting Pop's artistic evolution. However, because Bowie largely created it, fans do not generally consider the album as being representative of Pop's output. It has influenced post-punk, industrial, and gothic acts, including Joy Division.

== Background ==
From the late 1960s to the early 1970s, Iggy Pop was the frontman of the proto-punk band the Stooges. He became known for his wild on-stage behavior and helped garner a cult following for the band. During their tenure, the band had little commercial success and almost all members, including Pop, suffered from drug addictions. In 1971, Pop met musician David Bowie and the two became friends. Bowie was hired to mix the band's 1973 album Raw Power. Soon after its release, the band broke up in 1974 because of infighting, lack of major label support, and Pop's drug addiction, causing Pop and Bowie to stop collaborating. After the break-up, Pop recorded tracks with fellow Stooges member James Williamson, but these were not released until 1977 (as Kill City, credited jointly to Pop and Williamson). Pop tried to establish himself as a solo artist and auditioned to join other bands such as the Doors and Kiss, but these ventures were unsuccessful. Realizing his heroin addiction was destroying him, Pop checked himself into the Neuropsychiatric Institute at the University of California in Los Angeles for help to get sober; Bowie was one of Pop's few visitors during his stay. Pop recalled: "Nobody else came ... not even my so-called friends in LA. But David came." Pop and Bowie reunited in mid-1975 and attempted to record a few tracks, but both men were deep into their drug addictions, so the sessions were mostly unproductive. Bowie commented, "He'll never make it to the recording studios in time. Iggy's doomed."

Pop's stints in rehab in 1974 and 1976 were unsuccessful, and Bowie's biographer, Thomas Jerome Seabrook, described Pop as reaching his "lowest point" in 1976. Knowing he had to become sober, Pop accepted an invitation to join Bowie on his 1976 Isolar Tour. By this point, Bowie also wanted to rid himself of his drug addiction. During the tour, Pop was impressed with Bowie's work ethic, later stating that he learned all of his self-help techniques through Bowie on the tour. There were further talks of Pop recording a solo album with Bowie as producer. Bowie and the guitarist Carlos Alomar had written a new song, "Sister Midnight", and offered it to Pop; Bowie occasionally performed it live on the tour. Toward the end of the tour, both Bowie and Pop knew they wanted to avoid the drug culture of Los Angeles, and decided to move to Europe. At its conclusion, Bowie was initially keen to produce "Sister Midnight" in Munich, Germany, for release as a single. After visiting the Château d'Hérouville in Hérouville, France, the same place Bowie recorded his 1973 album Pin Ups, he instead decided to produce an entire album for Pop there. Bowie booked two months of studio time at the château for later in the summer of 1976.

== Recording ==
Bowie and Pop arrived at Château d'Hérouville in June 1976 to record an album. Bowie bonded with the studio's new owner, Laurent Thibault, the former bassist of the French band Magma, and asked him to play bass and act as engineer; Thibault hired the Frenchman Michel Santangeli to play drums. Bowie composed, using keyboard and guitar, much of the music that ended up on the album. After Santangeli's arrival, Bowie played the tracks for him using a Baldwin electric piano. For two days, with minimal guidance, Santangeli played to the rough tracks (which he assumed were demos), the first takes often becoming part of the final mix. Bowie dismissed Santangeli at the end of the second day, leading him to believe his playing was inadequate, and he would not appear on the album; Santangeli later expressed regret over the final drum sound. Subsequently, Bowie began adding guitar parts. Overall, Bowie contributed guitar, electric piano, synthesizer, saxophone, and backing vocals to the album.

After the backing tracks were composited with guitar, keyboards, and drums, Bowie had Thibault add bass to them with little guidance. In July 1976, Bowie brought in his own rhythm section consisting of the bassist George Murray and the drummer Dennis Davis to provide overdubs on a few tracks, including "Sister Midnight" and "Mass Production". While Bowie composed much of the music for The Idiot, Pop wrote most of the lyrics on the studio floor, often in response to the music Bowie was composing. Pop was also keen to improvise some of his lyrics while standing next to the microphone, something that fascinated Bowie, who later used this method when recording "Heroes" (1977).

Recording continued in August 1976 at Musicland Studios in Munich, which was owned by Bowie's future collaborator, the electronic dance music producer Giorgio Moroder. Here, Pop recorded most of his vocals, along with additional guitar overdubs provided by the guitarist Phil Palmer who, like Santangeli and Thibault, re-recorded some of Bowie's guitar parts with little guidance. Palmer described the creative collaboration with Pop and Bowie as "vampiric" because he never saw the artists during the daytime and the collaboration was stimulating but disquieting. Bowie's original choice for guitarist was former King Crimson member Robert Fripp, who later worked with him on "Heroes". The last track recorded for The Idiot was "Nightclubbing" with Bowie playing the melody on piano using an old drum machine for backing. When Pop pronounced himself happy with the result, Bowie protested they needed real drums to finish it. Pop insisted on keeping the drum machine, saying "it kicks ass, it's better than a drummer".

When recording was completed, Bowie and Pop traveled to Berlin to mix the album at Hansa Studio 1 (not, as is often incorrectly reported, the bigger Studio 2 by the Berlin Wall). Because his former producer Tony Visconti was already in line to co-produce Bowie's next album, Bowie called upon him to help mix the record, so as to familiarize him with Bowie's new way of working. Given the almost demo quality of the tapes, the post-production work was, in Visconti's words, "more of a salvage job than a creative mixing".

== Styles and themes ==
The Idiot marks a drastic departure for Pop from the aggressive proto-punk sound of the Stooges, reflecting a more subdued, inward-looking sound featuring elements such as "fragmented guitar figures, ominous basslines, and discordant, high-relief keyboard parts" as well as his "world-weary baritone." At the time of its release, Pop described The Idiot as "a cross between James Brown and Kraftwerk". Retrospectively, commentators have described The Idiot as an "ambitious art rock" album, an essential punk album. They have also noted the presence of gothic rock, industrial rock, with the album described as "totally out of step" with the punk sound birthed by the Stooges and credited with having "invented" post-punk. In 1981, NME editors Roy Carr and Charles Shaar Murray suggested that The Idiot's electronic sound had been "pioneered" on Bowie's Low (1977), whereas in 2016, Nicholas Pegg described it as "a stepping stone between Bowie's Station to Station and Low". According to the critic Simon Reynolds, the album's "mechanistic grooves, brittle drums and harsh guitar textures" anticipated Bowie's Berlin Trilogy and allowed Bowie to explore his fascination with German electronic sounds inspired by Neu! and Cluster. Wesley Strick of Circus magazine described the music as "mechanized", similar to Bowie's "Fame", but "with rhythms keyed off a quickened pulse", while Creem's Richard Riegel called it "professional studio metal, with occasional German-electronic overtones". NME's Nick Kent described the music as "totally rivetted and fettered to a thoroughly unhealthy aroma of evil and twilight zone zombie-time unease". Bowie biographer David Buckley called The Idiot "a funky, robotic Hellhole of an album".

=== Side one ===
"Nightclubbing"
Bowie composed the music to "Nightclubbing", which exhibits an influence of Krautrock, a genre Bowie further experimented with on Low. Pop's lyrics reflect him hanging out with Bowie "every night", further displaying Bowie's influence on the record.

"Sister Midnight" is similar to the funk style of Bowie's tracks "Fame" and "Stay", described by critics Thomas Jerome Seabrook and Chris O'Leary as the song most representative of Bowie's pre-Berlin period. Its lack of overtly electronic instrumentation belied what the critic Dave Thompson described as a "defiantly futuristic ambience". Bowie wrote the first lyrics of the opening verse of "Sister Midnight" while on tour; Pop completed them in the studio. Reviewers have compared Pop's vocal performance to Jim Morrison of the Doors. The author Peter Doggett writes the identity of "Sister Midnight" is irrelevant, explaining that "she was merely a cipher, who could send [Pop] soaring to the moon or falling to Earth ... without either journey seeming to register on his emotions". The Krautrock-influenced "Nightclubbing" is considered a forerunner to what Bowie explored on Low. The riff has been described as a mischievous take on Gary Glitter's "Rock and Roll". Kris Needs described it as "the bleak sound of the 1985 disco, as ghostly electronic washes sky-write phrases over an unsettling, distorted disco pulse". Lyrically, Pop described "Nightclubbing" as "my comment on what it was like hanging out with him every night" and "about the incredible coldness and deathly feeling you have after you've done something like that and how much you enjoy it. It could be Los Angeles or Paris or New York or anywhere, really."

Originally titled "Fun Fun Fun", Hugo Wilcken describes "Funtime" as a "proto-gothic number". Pegg writes that the guitar and drum sounds exhibit Bowie's interest in German bands such as Neu! Some reviewers have compared the song's style to the Velvet Underground. For the track, Bowie advised Pop to sing "like Mae West, like a bitch who wants to make money". Lyrically, the song evokes both Bowie and Pop's final days living in Los Angeles, with lines like "talkin' to Dracula and his crew". Bowie's backing vocals were mixed almost as high as Pop's lead ones. Pop called it his "love song" in 1977. "Baby" is primarily led by bass and synthesizer rather than drums. While it is German influenced, Seabrook considers the song more cabaret and less Krautrock. Lyrically, it is about a relationship that is soon to fail. Unlike the next track, Pop cautions the listener to "stay clean, stay young, and not cry, because he's already done it all". Originally called "Borderline", "China Girl" is the most upbeat track on the album. The song is led primarily by a distorted guitar and synthesizer. Production-wise, it is raw and unpolished compared to Bowie's 1983 remake. It is a tale of unrequited love inspired by Kuelan Nguyen, partner of French actor-singer Jacques Higelin, who was also recording at the château at the same time. The protagonist's "Shhh ..." was a direct quote from Nguyen after Pop confessed his feelings for her one night. Pop improvised most of the lyrics while standing at a studio microphone.

=== Side two ===
In 1997, Pop explained the origins of "Dum Dum Boys": "I only had a few notes on the piano, I couldn't quite finish the tune. Bowie said, 'Don't you think we could make a song with that? Why don't you tell the story of the Stooges?' He gave me the concept of the song and ... the title", originally "Dum Dum Days". Likewise a tribute/lament for Pop's former Stooges bandmates, the spoken intro references Zeke Zettner, Dave Alexander, Scott Asheton, and Williamson. O'Leary considers it Pop's equivalent to Bowie's song "Ziggy Stardust". Musically, Seabrook compares it to the Stooges' Fun House (1970). Bowie originally played all the guitar parts himself, but feeling his playing was subpar, he ultimately had Palmer overdub some parts.

"Tiny Girls", sequenced between the two longest tracks on The Idiot, is reminiscent of a 1950s doo-wop number. Lyrically, Pop's ideal is getting a "tiny girl" with "no past" and "no tricks". Both Pegg and Seabrook consider Bowie's saxophone performance on the track one of his finest. The final track, "Mass Production", is an eight-minute epic. Seabrook compares it to the Stooges' "Dirt" and Bowie's "Station to Station". Wilcken describes the song as a harsh, grinding piece of early industrial electronica. It begins with a minute of "proto-industrial noises", created by Thibault using tape loops. Bowie suggested the lyrics to Pop, who later recalled: "He just said, 'I want you to write a song about mass production, because I would always talk to him about how much I admired the beauty of the American industrial culture that was rotting away where I grew up."

== Release and promotion ==
The title of The Idiot was taken from Fyodor Dostoevsky's novel of the same name, which Bowie, Pop, and Visconti were all familiar with. In a 1985 interview, Pop said Bowie was the one who titled it. Pop knew it was a reference to the novel but also felt his friend was simply insulting him. Erich Heckel's painting Roquairol inspired the album's cover photo. It is a black-and-white flopped image photograph taken by photographer Andy Kent, it depicts Pop striking what Pegg calls a "tortured, stiff-limbed pose" based on the figure in the painting. Bowie later used the same painting as inspiration for the cover artwork for "Heroes".

Although Pop completed The Idiot by August 1976, Bowie wanted to be sure he had his own album in stores before the release. Thibault opined that "[Bowie] didn't want people to think he'd been inspired by Iggy's album, when in fact it was all the same thing". Bowie recorded Low between September and October, and released through RCA Records in January 1977. Because Low had a sound similar to The Idiot, the label feared it would not sell well. Nevertheless, the former and its first single "Sound and Vision" were commercial successes. The success of "Sound and Vision" allowed Bowie to persuade RCA to release The Idiot, which they did on March 18, 1977. The Idiot peaked at number 72 on the US Billboard Top LPs & Tape chart, spending 13 weeks on the chart. It also spent three weeks on the UK Albums Chart, reaching number 30, marking Pop's first top 40 album. It also peaked at number 88 on the Kent Music Report in Australia. RCA released the singles "Sister Midnight" and "China Girl" in February and May 1977, respectively; both had the same B-side—"Baby", and failed to chart.

Although RCA was hoping he would tour to support Low, Bowie opted instead to support Pop on his own tour. With Bowie playing keyboards, he assembled a band that included Ricky Gardiner on guitar, with brothers and future Tin Machine bandmates Tony Fox and Hunt Sales on bass and drums, respectively. Rehearsals for The Idiot tour began in mid-February 1977 and, according to Gardiner, went very well. He said Bowie was fine with restricting his involvement, not appearing to "undermine" Pop at all. The tour, Pop's first since the demise of the Stooges, began on March 1. The opening act was American rock band Blondie, who Bowie and Pop invited after the pair heard the band's 1976 debut album. Songs played included popular Stooges numbers, a couple of tracks from The Idiot, and songs that appeared on Pop's follow-up Lust for Life (1977). Bowie was adamant about not taking the spotlight away from Pop, often staying behind his keyboard and not addressing the audience; Giovanni Dadomo of Sounds reported, "If you wanted David, you also got the band." Pop's stage presence was praised, although some, including Nick Kent, believed that Bowie was still in charge. The tour lasted until April 16, 1977. The Idiot and his subsequent tour earned Pop greater fame and success than he had ever achieved with the Stooges. However, during interviews, he was often asked about Bowie more than his own work. As a result, Pop took a more direct approach when making Lust for Life, resulting in a sound more reminiscent of his earlier work.

== Critical reception ==
Professional ratings
Review scores
Source	Rating
AllMusic	5/5 stars
Chicago Tribune	3/4 stars
Christgau's Record Guide	A−
Encyclopedia of Popular Music	4/5 stars
NME	8/10
Pitchfork	8.6/10
Q	5/5 stars
Record Mirror	4/5 stars
The Rolling Stone Album Guide	4/5 stars
Spin Alternative Record Guide	7/10

Critical reception to The Idiot was largely positive, although it did confuse a number of reviewers. Doggett writes that listeners' perceptions of Pop generally influenced their views on the record. In a contemporary review of the album, John Swenson of Rolling Stone termed it "the most savage indictment of rock posturing ever recorded" and "a necrophiliac's delight". In Melody Maker, Allan Jones praised the record as a "disturbingly pertinent expression of modern music". Strick positively compared The Idiot to Pop's prior work with the Stooges, noting the difference in his vocal performance: "[He] doesn't sound alive ... he sounds automated." He further complimented Pop's lyricism, stating, "Iggy's got the tainted charisma of a dead poet." Like Strick, Riegel noted the difference in The Idiot and Raw Power, writing: "Where Raw Power represented the final apotheosis of the Detroit-metal rock band, The Idiot puts Iggy right out in front as a kind of rarefied, continent-seasoned singer-songwriter." Billboard magazine noted the "less frantic" pace of Pop's earlier efforts and found Bowie's parts make the record more "commercially palatable". In their year-end list, Sounds magazine placed The Idiot at number 12.

Similar to other reviewers, Kris Needs of ZigZag magazine was perplexed upon hearing The Idiot for the first time, noting the major difference between it and Pop's work with the Stooges. Calling it "a very strange, morbid, obscure and unsettling [album]", Needs praised the record, stating he listened to it on repeat for hours at a time, and it "chill[ed] [him] to the marrow". John Rockwell of The New York Times called it "a powerful record", describing Pop's vocals as a blend of Morrison and Lou Reed and Bowie's music as "Germano‐British progressivisms". Record Mirror's Jim Evans found "little emotion" in Pop's vocal performances but considered the music innovative and compulsive, particularly on side two, which he deemed borderline heavy metal. In a more mixed review, Stephen Demorest of Phonograph Record said he enjoyed the record, due to its "completely schizophrenic" nature. He called "China Girl" the highlight of the album, but felt other tracks were not among Pop's finest: "It's a mixture of bluff ... and beauty."

Retrospective reviews have been largely positive, with many noting Pop's artistic evolution. Mark Deming of AllMusic praised the record, writing that The Idiot showcased a different side of Pop that had yet to be seen, and if fans at the time were expecting Raw Power 2.0, it "made it clear" that Pop had evolved: "it's a flawed but powerful and emotionally absorbing work." The biographer Paul Trynka writes that over time, The Idiot would be classified as an album that was "more respected than loved", but acknowledged its influence on the "soul" of post-punk. Writing for Clash magazine on the record's 35th anniversary, Amanda Arber stated: "The Idiot stands as a dark, dense and desolate display of an artist confronting his demons head-on, and growing up in the process. It was bleakly revolutionary then, and it is now." Reviewing the album as part of the 2020 box set The Bowie Years, Sasha Geffen of Pitchfork praised it, stating: "The Idiot may lack fury, but it compensates with sardonic humor and perfectly tuned melodrama – both tools that [became] wildly popular across all artistic media in the 1980s."

== Influence and legacy ==
[The Idiot was my] album of freedom. I'm not saying that it's a great album or some fantastic work of art, but I love it and it means a lot to me.

— Iggy Pop on The Idiot

Although reviewers consider The Idiot good in its own right, Pop's fans have criticized the album as unrepresentative of his repertoire and as evidence of his being "co-opted" by Bowie for the latter's own ends. In his contemporary review of the record, Riegel comments, "As the star of The Idiot ... Iggy Pop seems more under David Bowie's manipulative thumb than ever before, a condition that can be taken as positive or negative." Furthermore, Jones described it as his "second favorite David Bowie album". When reviewing Lust for Life, Pete Makowski of Sounds magazine felt The Idiot suffered from "being a part of Bowie's come down," calling it "a Low disco platter". O'Leary considers The Idiot a Bowie album just as much as a Pop one. Although Bowie's "Berlin Trilogy" is said to consist of Low, "Heroes", and Lodger (1979), O'Leary argues the true "Berlin Trilogy" consists of The Idiot, Low, and "Heroes", with Lust for Life a "supplement" and Lodger an "epilogue". Bowie himself later admitted:

Poor [Iggy], in a way, became a guinea pig for what I wanted to do with sound. I didn't have the material at the time, and I didn't feel like writing at all. I felt much more like laying back and getting behind someone else's work, so that album was opportune, creatively.

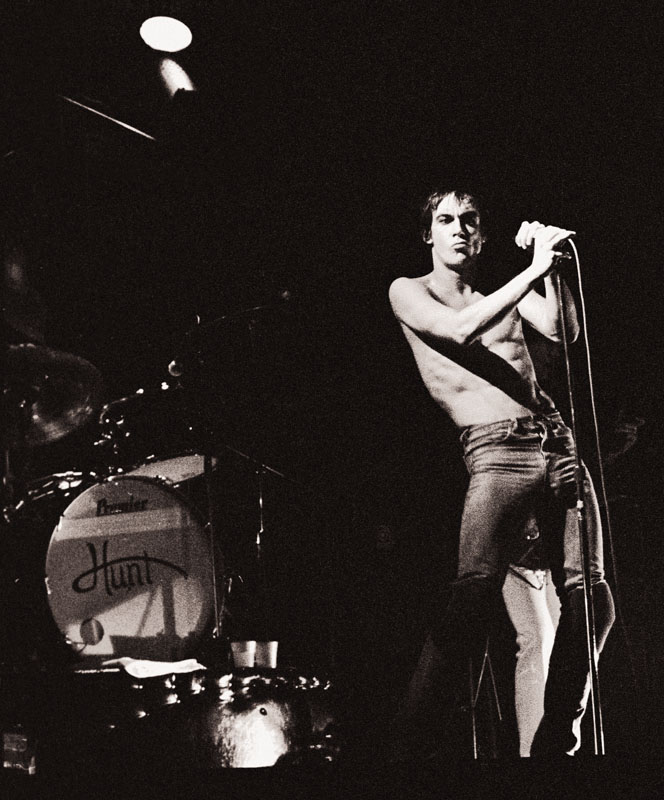
Pop performed songs from The Idiot during the Lust for Life tour in late 1977.

Bowie later re-worked "Sister Midnight" with new lyrics as "Red Money" on Lodger, while his version of "China Girl" on Let's Dance (1983) became a major hit.

Siouxsie Sioux of Siouxsie and the Banshees described The Idiot as a "re-affirmation that our suspicions were true – the man was a genius and what a voice! The sound and production is so direct and uncompromised." The album has been cited as a major influence on post-punk, industrial, and gothic rock artists, including Depeche Mode, Nine Inch Nails, and Joy Division. The album particularly influenced Joy Division, who formed in the months between the releases of Low and The Idiot. Their debut album Unknown Pleasures (1979) drew heavily on the "industrial soundscapes" and "relentless percussion" of tracks like "Nightclubbing" and "Mass Production". Ian Curtis killed himself whilst listening to The Idiot.

In addition, Seabrook cites "Mass Production" as an influence on modern alternative rock acts like the Smashing Pumpkins and Radiohead. In 2011, Killing Joke's Youth described The Idiot as one of his 13 favorite albums. Pitchfork later ranked The Idiot number 96 in its list of the 100 Best Albums of the 1970s in 2004. The album was also included in the 2018 edition of Robert Dimery's book 1001 Albums You Must Hear Before You Die.

=== 2020 deluxe edition ===
On April 10, 2020, Pop released an alternate mix of "China Girl" to promote the forthcoming release of The Bowie Years, a seven-disc deluxe box set featuring expanded remastered versions of The Idiot and Lust for Life. The box set, released on May 29, includes remastered versions of both albums along with outtakes, alternate mixes, and a 40-page booklet. The two original albums were also re-released individually, each paired with an additional album of live material to create separate stand-alone two-disc deluxe editions.

== Track listing ==
All tracks are written by Iggy Pop and David Bowie, except "Sister Midnight", by Pop, Bowie, and Carlos Alomar.

Side one
No.	Title	Length
1.	"Sister Midnight"	4:19
2.	"Nightclubbing"	4:14
3.	"Funtime"	2:54
4.	"Baby"	3:24
5.	"China Girl"	5:08

Side two
No.	Title	Length
1.	"Dum Dum Boys"	7:12
2.	"Tiny Girls"	2:59
3.	"Mass Production"	8:24

== Personnel ==
According to Thomas Jerome Seabrook:

- Iggy Pop – vocals
- David Bowie – keyboards, synthesizer, guitar, piano, saxophone, xylophone, backing vocals, Roland drum machine on "Nightclubbing"
- Carlos Alomar – guitar
- Phil Palmer – guitar
- Laurent Thibault – bass guitar
- George Murray – bass guitar
- Michel Santangeli – drums
- Dennis Davis – drums

Technical

- David Bowie – producer, arranger
- Tony Visconti – mixer
- Laurent Thibault – engineer

== Charts ==
1977 chart performance for The Idiot
Chart (1977)	Peak position
Australian Albums (Kent Music Report)	88
UK Albums (Official Charts)	30
US Billboard Top LPs & Tape	72
