= You Don't Want My Name... You Want My Action =

Live album by The Stooges
- Released: September 30, 2009
- Recorded: May–April 1971
- Genre: Hard rock Protopunk; Punk rock
- Label: Easy Action

Professional ratings
Review scores
Source	Rating
AllMusic	4/5 stars

You Don't Want My Name... You Want My Action is a live compilation album by rock band The Stooges. Released as a 4-CD box-set by British reissue label Easy Action, it documents the time period in between Fun House and Raw Power, when the group was a five-piece outfit including a young James Williamson.

== History ==
After being dropped by Elektra Records, the band was self-managed and still touring. Much of the year 1971 for the band is undocumented, considering the luxury of booking a studio was lost. There were four known audience recordings including performances at the Electric Circus in New York City, The Factory in St. Louis, and the Vanity Ballroom in Detroit. All recording contains the same 6-song set that they ran through every time they went on stage. Most members of the band were addicted to heroin, and most of the money that they earned they paid for drugs with it. By the end of the year, the Stooges broke up into obscurity until their revival in 1972 when the remaining Stooges recorded Raw Power.

== Songlist ==
Disc One: May 14, 1971, Electric Circus, New York City

1. I Got a Right [False Start]
2. You Don't Want My Name
3. The Shadow of Your Smile [Iggy Solo]
4. Fresh Rag (Or New York Pussy Smells Like Dog Shit)
5. Dead Body (Or Over My Dead Body)/Who Do You Love
6. BigTime Bum
7. Do You Want Me Love?/Feedback/Goodnight
8. The Children of the Night

Disc Two: May 15, 1971, Electric Circus, New York City

1. I Got a Right
2. You Don't Want My Name
3. Fresh Rag (Or New York Pussy Tastes Like a Dog)
4. Dead Body/Who Do You Love?
5. BigTime Bum (Over My Dead Cock)
6. Do You Want Me Love?

Disc Three: May 27, 1971, The Factory, St. Louis

1. I Got a Right
2. You Don't Want My Name (Or St. Louis Adolescent Nightmare)
3. Fresh Rag (Or Sweet Revenge for Treating Me Like a Piece of Shit)
4. Dead Body/Who Do You Love?
5. BigTime Bum
6. Do You Want My Love [Band Leave Stage Early Due to Ron's Injury]

Disc Four: April 13, 1971, The Vanity Ballroom, Detroit

1. I Got a Right
2. You Don't Want My Name
3. Fresh Rag
4. Dead Body (Or Black Like Me)/Who Do You Love?
5. BigTime Bum
6. Do You Want My Love?
7. Band Talk with the Audience
8. What You Gonna Do?

== Personnel ==
The Stooges

- Iggy Pop – lead vocals
- Ron Asheton – guitar, backing vocals
- James Williamson – guitar
- Jimmy Recca – bass guitar
- Scott Asheton – drums
