= Metallic K.O. =

Live album by the Stooges
- Released: 1976, 1988, 1998
- Recorded: October 1973 & February 1974
- Venue: Michigan Palace, Detroit
- Genre: Proto-punk; hard rock; punk rock
- Length: 37:14 (1976); 58:31 (1988); 82:39 (1998)
- Label: Skydog; Jungle
- Producer: Iggy Pop

The Stooges chronology
Raw Power (1973)	Metallic K.O. (1976)	Open Up and Bleed (1995)

Professional ratings
Review scores
Source	Rating
AllMusic	5/5 stars
Christgau's Record Guide	C+
Tom Hull – on the Web	B+

Metallic K.O. is a live recording by American rock band the Stooges. In its original form, the album was purported to contain the last half of a performance at the Michigan Palace in Detroit, on February 9, 1974—the band's final live performance until their reformation in 2003. The performance was notable for the level of audience hostility, with the band being constantly pelted with pieces of ice, eggs, beer bottles and jelly beans, among other things, in response to Iggy Pop's audience-baiting.

Subsequent investigation of the master tapes and the May 1988 release of the double album Metallic 2X K.O. reveals that the original album contained the last half of the February 9, 1974, show, but opened with the first half of an earlier show (from October 6, 1973) at the same venue. The 2X K.O. version features the full shows from both dates.

In 1998, the album was re-released under the original title with a reverse show order, (mostly) expanded track lengths and even more complete set-lists.

== History ==
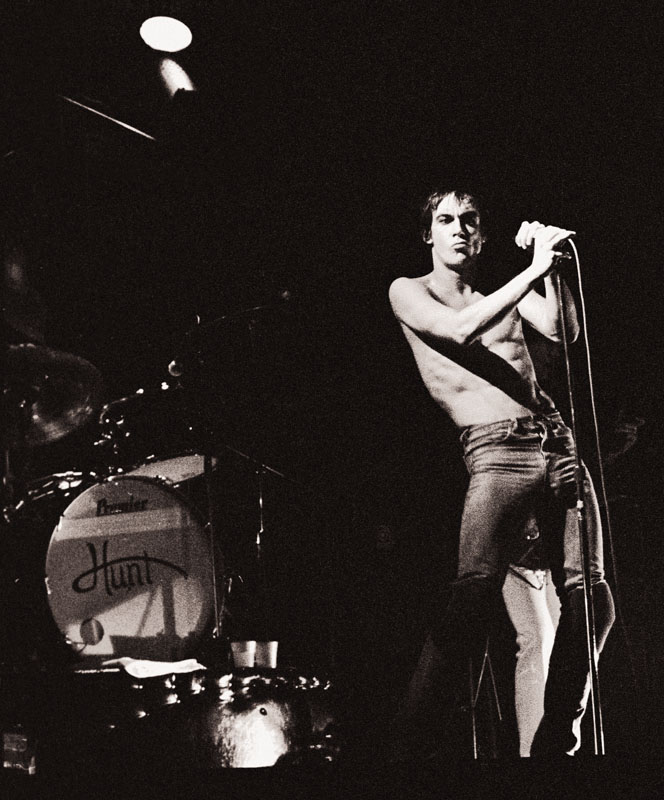
Iggy Pop in 1977

The album was recorded on a reel-to-reel tape machine by Michael Tipton, later obtained by Stooges guitarist James Williamson. Williamson's involvement and Iggy's endorsement meant it was considered a "semi-official" bootleg, when released on the Skydog label in 1976.

The album is mostly composed of previously unreleased material. Studio demo and rehearsal recordings of some of its songs later turned up on similarly semi-official posthumous Stooges compilations.

"I went to the radio station and challenged the Scorpions [motorcycle club] to come down and do their worst at my big show in Detroit," Iggy explained. "Which they proceeded to do. You can hear all sorts of things on the tape flying through the air: shovels, four-gallon jugs, M-80s… but our lady fans in the front rows threw a lot of beautiful underwear, which I thought was sweet."

The album proved popular, due to its release in the first era of punk rock and the Stooges' growing legend as protopunks. It outsold the Stooges' major label official releases, selling over 100,000 copies in America as an import in its first year alone.

== Musical style ==
The album is notable for Iggy Pop's vulgar rendition of "Louie, Louie", which deviates wildly from the song's original lyrics. Overall, the playing on the album is ragged, and during "Rich Bitch" the band go out of time with each other, having to be coached back into the song by Iggy – "Gimme just the drums! It's the only way you're ever gonna get it right, take it down to the drums!" He then counts the other players back into the beat. In addition to long-time Stooges members Pop, Ron Asheton (bass guitar), Scott Asheton (drums), and Williamson (guitar), the line-up on the album features Scott Thurston on piano, who had become an official member of the band by this point.

== Context by Lester Bangs ==
In the essay "Iggy Pop: Blowtorch in Bondage" critic Lester Bangs calls the album a "documentation of the Iggy holocaust at its most nihilistically out of control." He describes the Stooges concert he attended that immediately preceded the Metallic K.O. performances:

The audience, which consisted largely of bikers, was unusually hostile, and Iggy, as usual, fed on that hostility, soaked it up and gave it back and absorbed it all over again in an eerie, frightening symbiosis. "All right," he finally said, stopping a song in the middle, "you assholes wanta hear 'Louie, Louie,' we'll give you 'Louie, Louie.'" So the Stooges played a forty-five-minute version of "Louie Louie," including new lyrics improvised by the Pop on the spot consisting of "You can suck my ass / You biker faggot sissies," etc. By now the hatred in the room is one huge livid wave, and Iggy singles out one heckler who has been particularly abusive: "Listen, asshole, you heckle me one more time and I'm gonna come down there and kick your ass." "Fuck you, you little punk," responds the biker. So Iggy jumps off the stage, runs through the middle of the crowd, and the guy beats the shit out of him, ending the evening's musical festivities by sending the lead singer back to his motel room and a doctor. I walk into the dressing room, where I encounter the manager of the club offering to punch out anybody in the band who will take him on. The next day the bike gang, who call themselves the Scorpions, will phone WABX-FM and promise to kill Iggy and the Stooges if they play the Michigan Palace on Thursday night. They do (play, that is), and nobody gets killed, but Metallic K.O. is the only rock album I know where you can actually hear hurled beer bottles breaking against guitar strings.

== Track listing ==
All songs written by Iggy Pop and James Williamson, except where noted.

=== Original 1976 release ===
There have been many wildly varying releases of Metallic K.O. over the years on many different labels. This track listing is based on the first release, the 1976 Skydog LP.

All tracks were recorded in Detroit's Michigan Palace. Side one was recorded on October 6, 1973; side two was recorded on February 9, 1974. The 1974 show was the final Stooges show until the band's reunion in 2003.

==== Side one: first half of the October 6, 1973, show ====
1. "Raw Power" – (5:29)
2. "Head On" – (7:23)
3. "Gimme Danger" – (6:45)

==== Side two: second half of the February 9, 1974, show ====
1. "Rich Bitch" – (10:52)
2. "Cock in My Pocket" – (3:21)
3. "Louie Louie" (Richard Berry) – (3:24)

=== Metallic 2X K.O. 1988 release ===
This expanded version of the album includes the complete shows from both 1973 and 1974. The 1973 show is presented on sides one and two; the 1974 show is presented on sides three and four. The track times are taken from the original, vinyl release and do not include Iggy's audience baiting.

==== Side one: October 6, 1973, show ====
1. "Raw Power" – (5:40)
2. "Head On" – (7:26)
3. "Gimme Danger" – (7:26)

==== Side two: October 6, 1973, show ====
1. "Search and Destroy" – (4:35)
2. "Heavy Liquid" – (6:23)
3. "I Wanna Be Your Dog" – (1:00)

==== Side three: February 9, 1974, show ====
1. "Open Up and Bleed" – (4:15)
2. "I Got Nothin'" – (4:18)

==== Side four: February 9, 1974, show ====
1. "Rich Bitch" – (10:45)
2. "Cock in My Pocket" – (3:23)
3. "Louie Louie" (Richard Berry) – (3:20)

=== Metallic K.O. 1998 re-release (82:39) ===
In 1998, Jungle Records re-released the album with a reverse show order, (mostly) expanded track lengths and more complete set-lists.

==== Disc one: February 9, 1974, show (38:40) ====
1. "Heavy Liquid" – (3.24)
2. "I Got Nothin'" – (4:29)
3. "Rich Bitch" – (11:46)
4. "Gimme Danger" – (8:12)
5. "Cock in My Pocket" – (7:08)
6. "Louie Louie" (Richard Berry) – (3:41)

==== Disc two: October 6, 1973, show (43:59) ====
1. "Raw Power" – (5:47)
2. "Head On" – (8:30)
3. "Gimme Danger" – (7:11)
4. "Search and Destroy" – (8:44)
5. "Heavy Liquid" (including "I Wanna Be Your Dog") – (9:52)
6. "Open Up and Bleed" – (3.55)

=== 2007 remaster and From K.O. To Chaos box set (2020) ===
The original tapes for both the 1976 and 1988 versions of the album were remastered by ex-Spacemen 3 member Sterling Roswell. These versions corrected tape speed errors that made the music sound between a quarter and three-quarters off key, and have been the basis for all represses of Metallic K.O. And Metallic 2X K.O. since, including the 2020 box set From K.O. To Chaos (which includes both versions of the album as well as three other Iggy Pop solo live releases on Skydog/Jungle and Telluric Chaos, the 2005 live album chronicling the Stooges closing date of their 2004 Japanese tour.

== Personnel ==
The Stooges

- Iggy Pop – lead vocals
- James Williamson – guitar, backing vocals
- Ron Asheton – bass
- Scott Asheton – drums
- Scott Thurston – electric piano
