= Live in Detroit (The Stooges album) =

Live album by The Stooges
- Released: March 23, 2004
- Recorded: August 25, 2003
- Genres: Hard rock, punk rock
- Length: 100 minutes
- Label: Music Video Distributors (MVD)

The Stooges chronology
Open Up and Bleed (1995)	Live in Detroit (2004)	Telluric Chaos (2005)

Live in Detroit a 2004 DVD release of a live performance by the band The Stooges. The surviving original members of the Stooges reunited in 2003—nearly thirty years after they had disbanded—and scheduled a handful of live shows, including an August 14 concert in their hometown of Detroit. The gig was postponed due to a widespread North America blackout, but the band played at the DTE Energy Music Theatre eleven days later. (The DVD's liner notes contain a facetious remark about the blackout being caused by Ron Asheton playing his guitar during soundcheck the day of the original show.) The performance was released on DVD in March 2004.

== Critical reception ==
Allmusic's Greg Prato called Live in Detroit "essential viewing for Stooges fans one and all." Michael Molenda of Guitar Player praised the film's "clear and punchy" sound and said the performance "isn’t so much about watching old men relive their youth, as it is about being pummeled into submission by 50-year-old thugs." Michael Dwyer of The Age observed, "both the static framing and occasionally damaged video transfer are appalling from an audio-visual perspective, but that actually serves the Stooges' archetypal rock minimalism to perfection." Brian James of PopMatters also criticized the video quality, and said the performance itself "feels a bit hollow, too. The very feeling that drove the band’s music—some kind of loathing that was spread amorphously inwards and outwards—is absent, replaced instead by a lovefest between Iggy and the crowd."

== Track listing ==
All songs written by Iggy Pop, Ron Asheton, Scott Asheton, and Dave Alexander except where noted.

1. "Loose"
2. "Down On the Street"
3. "1969"
4. "I Wanna Be Your Dog"
5. "TV Eye"
6. "Dirt"
7. "Real Cool Time"
8. "No Fun"
9. "1970"
10. "Funhouse"
11. "Skull Ring"
12. "Not Right"
13. "Little Doll"
14. "I Wanna Be Your Dog"

Bonus - Live In New York

1. Intro
2. "Loose"
3. "Down On the Street"
4. "1969"
5. "I Wanna Be Your Dog"
6. "Real Cool Time"
7. "TV Eye"
8. "No Fun"
9. "Dead Rock Star" (Pop/Asheton/Asheton)
10. "Skull Ring" (Pop/Asheton/Asheton)
11. "Not Right"
