= Sick of You =

Sick of You may refer to:

- "Sick of You" (Cake song), 2010
- "Sick of You" (Gwar song), 1990
- "Sick of You", a song from the Selena Gomez and the Scene album A Year Without Rain, 2010
- "I'm Sick of You", a single by The Stooges, 1977
