= Heavy Liquid =

Heavy Liquid may refer to:

- Heavy liquid
- Heavy Liquid (album)
- Heavy Liquid (comics)
