= Zeke Zettner =

American roadie and musician (1948–1973)

- Born: September 21, 1948
- Died: November 10, 1973 (aged 25)
- Genres: Rock
- Instrument: Bass guitar
- Formerly of: The Stooges

Thomas "Zeke" Zettner (September 21, 1948 – November 10, 1973) was a member of the American rock band the Stooges. Zettner had originally been a roadie for the band, but replaced original Stooges bassist Dave Alexander after their second album, Fun House, until the end of 1970. Alexander's drinking problem had made him an unreliable performer. Jimmy Recca soon replaced Zettner as bass player.

== Early life ==
Thomas “Zeke” Zettner was born on 21 September 1948 to a middle-class family in Detroit, Michigan, and had two younger brothers named Randall and James, whom he was close to. His family ended up living in the city of Inkster, Michigan.

== Career ==
Zettner started his musical life as a roadie for SRC, having appeared in the inner sleeve of their 1970 album, Traveler’s Tale. Their lead singer, Scott Richardson, was previously in a band called The Chosen Few, which included lead guitarist James Williamson, whom Zettner shared an apartment with during his tenure in The Stooges, and bassist Ron Asheton. After his tenure in SRC ended, Zettner became a roadie for The Stooges, and can be heard mentioned by members of the band between takes on the sessions for The Stooges’ 1970 album Fun House. After the departure of bassist Dave Alexander, Zettner was invited in as a replacement for Alexander, along with the addition of fellow roadie Bill Cheatham as their second guitarist. Zettner and Cheatham did not live in the ‘Fun House’ with the other band members, instead living in an apartment complex in Ann Arbor with James Williamson, who would go on to replace Cheatham by December 1970, due to, according to Williamson, a cited lack of technical prowess on guitar. Zettner was noted by Williamson as, similar to Cheatham, lacking the ability of his predecessor, though he was noted as being somewhat more proficient than Cheatham. Zettner’s tenure with The Stooges ended in around the beginning of 1971, after already having played a few gigs with Williamson on guitar. He moved back into his parents’ home on the eastern side of Detroit and left music for a career in the automotive industry.

== Death ==
Zettner was a heroin addict, similar to the rest of the band, with the notable exception of Ron Asheton, due to having been introduced to heroin by a member of their management in the latter half of 1970. Zettner died of a perforated peptic ulcer and a cerebral edema caused by a heroin overdose on 10 November 1973. He is buried at Mt. Olivet Cemetery in Detroit, Michigan. His death is mentioned in Iggy Pop's song "Dum Dum Boys" from The Idiot.
