= Live at the Whiskey a Go-Go (The Stooges album) =

Live album by Iggy Pop & The Stooges
- Released: 1988
- Recorded: 16 September 1973
- Genre: Protopunk, hard rock, punk rock
- Length: 59:33
- Label: Revenge Records
- Producer: Ron Asheton

Live at the Whiskey a Go-Go is a live album by The Stooges, produced by Ron Asheton and released in 1988. It is the recording of the Stooges show on 16 September 1973 at the Whisky a Go Go nightclub, Los Angeles, California.

== Track listing ==
All songs written by Iggy Pop and James Williamson except as noted.

1. "Raw Power" – 5:12
2. "Head On" – 8:01
3. "Search and Destroy" – 4:49
4. "I Need Somebody" – 5:59
5. "New Orleans" – 5:53
6. "She Creatures of Hollywood Hills" – 9:53
7. "Open Up and Bleed" – 12:55
8. "Gimme Danger" – 6:49

== Personnel ==
The Stooges

- Iggy Pop – vocals
- James Williamson – guitars
- Ron Asheton – bass, vocals
- Scott Asheton – drums
- Scott Thurston – piano, mouth harp
