= I Wanna Be Your Dog =

- Cover of the 1969 Italian single

Single by the Stooges

from the album The Stooges
- B-side: "1969"
- Released: July 1969
- Recorded: 1969
- Studio: The Hit Factory, New York City
- Genre: Garage rock; proto-punk
- Length: 3:09
- Label: Elektra
- Songwriters: Dave Alexander; Ron Asheton; Scott Asheton; Iggy Pop
- Producer: John Cale

The Stooges singles chronology
"I Wanna Be Your Dog" (1969)	"1969" (1969)

Audio
- "I Wanna Be Your Dog" on YouTube

"I Wanna Be Your Dog" is a song by American rock band the Stooges, released as the group's debut single from the band's 1969 self-titled debut studio album. The riff is composed of only three chords (G, F♯ and E), playing continuously except for two brief 4-bar bridges. The 3 minute 9 second song has a distortion-heavy guitar intro, single-note piano riff played by producer John Cale of the Velvet Underground, and steady, driving beat typifying an early heavy metal and punk sound.

In 2004, the song was ranked number 438 on Rolling Stone magazine's list of the "500 Greatest Songs of All Time", dropping to number 445 on its 2010 revision, then at number 314 on its 2021 list. Pitchfork Media placed it at number 16 on its list of "The 200 Greatest Songs of the 1960s".

== Personnel ==
- Iggy Pop – vocals
- Ron Asheton – guitar
- Dave Alexander – bass
- Scott Asheton – drums
- John Cale – piano, sleigh bells

== Cover versions ==
- Sid Vicious performed a version of the song on his debut album Sid Sings (1979). Actor Gary Oldman performed the song as Sid in the film Sid & Nancy (1986).
- Spanish female punk band Las Vulpes covered the song in 1983 with lyrics in Spanish. The song's title, "Me gusta ser una zorra", translates to English as "I like being a whore". They performed the song on the Spanish national state television broadcaster on a Saturday at noon in April 1983, causing a stir for the explicit and harsh lyrics.
- Joan Jett & the Blackhearts covered and released this song as part of their 1988 album, Up Your Alley.
- Sonic Youth covered this song live on their Confusion Is Sex LP and on David Sanborn's Night Music TV show in 1989.
- Uncle Tupelo released a cover of the song on their 89/93: An Anthology compilation album, having previously released a demo cover of the song on their March 16–20, 1992 LP.
- Émilie Simon covered the song in her 2003 debut self-titled album, leading to compliments from Iggy Pop.
- Matt Mays recorded a cover of the song on his 2020 album Dog City.
- Actor John McCrea sang a cover version heard in the 2021 film Cruella. McCrea also appeared in the film. Damiano David, lead vocalist of Måneskin, performed a cover of the song for the Italian dub of the film.
- Modern Life Is War released a cover in 2021 on their EP Tribulation Worksongs, Vol. 3.

== Certifications ==
Certifications and sales for "I Wanna Be Your Dog"
Region	Certification	Certified units/sales
United Kingdom (BPI) Sales since 2007	Silver	200,000^{‡}
^{‡} Sales+streaming figures based on certification alone.
