= Open Up and Bleed =

Open Up and Bleed!

Live album by Iggy and the Stooges
- Released: 1995
- Recorded: 1973
- Genres: Proto-punk, hard rock, punk rock
- Length: 64:33 (CD version)
- Label: BOMP! (cat# BCD 4051)

Iggy and the Stooges chronology
Metallic K.O. (1976)	Open Up and Bleed! (1995)	Live in Detroit (2003)

Professional ratings
Review scores
Source	Rating
AllMusic	3.5/5 stars

Open Up and Bleed! is a live album by Iggy and the Stooges that was released in 1995. Recorded in 1973, the cover bears the subtitle "The Great Lost Stooges Album?" and the album features a collection of songs that the band had been performing in their live shows, which might have appeared on a fourth studio album by the band that was never released.

== Track listing ==
All tracks are written by Iggy Pop and James Williamson, except where noted.

No.	Title	Writer(s)	Length
1.	"Rubber Legs"		5:22
2.	"Open Up and Bleed"		4:55
3.	"Johanna"		4:37
4.	"Cock in My Pocket"		3:51
5.	"Head On"	Williamson	5:42
6.	"Cry for Me"		6:47
7.	"Rich Bitch"	Pop	9:54
8.	"Wet My Bed"		5:36
9.	"I Got Nothing"	Pop	4:02
10.	"Heavy Liquid/New Orleans"		5:59
11.	"She Creatures of the Hollywood Hills"		4:48
12.	"Rubber Legs (Version 2)"	Williamson	5:40
Total length:			64:33

Note: Tracks 9, 10, and 12 are bonus tracks that do not appear on the vinyl version.

== Personnel ==
- Iggy Pop – lead vocals
- James Williamson – guitar
- Ron Asheton – bass, backing vocals
- Scott Asheton – drums
- Scott Thurston – piano

Technical

- Patrick Boissel – remastering
- Claude Gassian – photography
- Frank Meyer – liner notes
- Greg Shaw – graphic design
- Mike Wolf – remastering
