= The New Order (band) =

American rock band (1975–1976)

- Also known as: Ron Asheton's New Order
- Origin: Los Angeles, California, U.S.
- Genres: Hard rock, protopunk
- Years active: 1975–1976
- Labels: Fun; Isadora; Revenge; New Rose; Vivid Sound Corporation (limited edition Japanese import)
- Past members: Ron Asheton; Jimmy Recca; Scott Thurston; K.J. Knight; Jeff Spry; Dave Gilbert; Dennis "Machine Gun" Thompson; Ray Gunn

The New Order was an American hard rock and protopunk band. The band was based in Los Angeles and existed from early 1975 to October 1976.

Though the group was short-lived and never released a proper full-length album, they are known for being led by guitarist Ron Asheton of The Stooges.

== History ==
After The Stooges imploded in 1974, former Stooges lead guitarist Ron Asheton formed a new band, ultimately acquiring drummer Dennis "Machine Gun" Thompson, bass player Jimmy Recca and keyboardist Scott Thurston. For a while, the new band shared rehearsal space at a house owned by Ray Manzarek, during his collaboration with Stooges' lead singer Iggy Pop.

When The New Order's first singer Jeff Spry was forced to quit the band (due to jail time incurred from a drinking/quaalude-related DUI coupled with failure to perform community service), The New Order's first drummer, K.J. Knight, recommended Dave Gilbert as a replacement. K.J. and Gilbert had both been veterans of the 1971/1972 incarnations of Ted Nugent's Amboy Dukes. After keyboardist Scott Thurston quit, his position was filled by a second guitarist, Ray Gunn (not to be confused with the 2026 animated film), another Detroit veteran who was recommended by Dennis Thompson.

Leading up to the making of The New Order's first demo tapes, long time Blue Öyster Cult producer, Sandy Pearlman, was approached to produce the band but ultimately this didn't come together. The back cover of the Declaration of War album bears the inscription: "This album is dedicated to the CULT", furthering the links with the Blue Öyster Cult.

A projected collaboration with '60s and '70s rock impresario, Kim Fowley, was also talked about, but never came to fruition.

== After The New Order ==
After The New Order, Asheton and Thompson formed New Race with Radio Birdman's lead singer Rob Younger, lead guitarist Deniz Tek and bass player Warwick Gilbert. This band started and ended in 1981, with no studio material recorded, but three live albums released, with two of the three first released on Revenge Records, then re-released recently on Vivid Sound Corporation.

Singer Jeff Spry briefly left the band Felony to work with the New Order but returned back to the band to work with his guitarist brother, Joe Spry, which had a much played 1983 hit song ("The Fanatic") on the influential Los Angeles radio station, KROQ-FM. The song was featured on the soundtrack to the 1983 movie, Valley Girl. A video was made from "The Fanatic" "The Fanatic" video was shot in Hollywood, California in 1983 and aired on MTV. The Fanatic video includes a cameo of Jeffrey Spry with his first wife, SAG actress, Lucrecia Sarita Russo. On March 9, 1991, Jeff Spry shot himself, leaving behind his second wife, Tamara and daughters, Desirae & Natasha.

Following The New Order's split in the fall of 1976, Dave Gilbert eventually joined The Rockets, a band formed in 1972 out of Mitch Ryder and The Detroit Wheels. The Rockets recorded six albums, on three major labels, from 1977 to 1983. Dave Gilbert died in 2001 from cancer of the liver after a lifetime struggle with drugs and alcohol addictions, although he had embraced sobriety sometime before being diagnosed with cancer.

== Discography ==
=== Debut album and Declaration of War ===
The New Order recorded demos twice in Los Angeles: First in 1975 with Jeff Spry as lead singer and then in 1976 with Dave Gilbert as lead singer. Both recordings were later released with production by Neil Merryweather in 1977 as a single album "The New Order", on the Fun Records/Isadora label and distributed by RCA Records. The album's lo-fi quality was the result of it being produced from Ron Asheton's inferior cassette copies, instead of the original master tapes. The album was later reissued with different cover art and a bonus track as Declaration of War in 1987. Declaration of War was reissued again in 1991, this time on CD.

=== Victim of Circumstance ===
In 1989, Victim of Circumstance was released on vinyl and CD on the Revenge Records label. This release consisted of eight unreleased rehearsal recordings, with side one of the original vinyl release presented as four bonus tracks on the CD version. In April 2008, the CD was re-released on the Japanese import label, Vivid Sound Corporation. This new release has the same title and track listing as Victim of Circumstance, but has the same cover art as the original 1977 vinyl release - although "The New Order" logo's font has been revamped and changed. Vivid Sound Corporation also re-released the second and third live albums by the related Ron Asheton/Dennis Thompson band, New Race.
