= Bill Cheatham =

- Born: William Gordon Cheatham; July 17, 1948; Somerset, Kentucky, United States
- Died: February 3, 1997 (aged 48) Ann Arbor, Michigan, US
- Genres: Proto-punk; hard rock; garage rock
- Occupation: Musician
- Instrument: Guitar
- Years active: 1970
- Label: Elektra
- Formerly of: The Stooges

William Gordon Cheatham (July 6, 1948 – February 3, 1997) was an American guitarist and Freemason, best known as a roadie and later rhythm guitarist for the rock band The Stooges. Cheatham was a childhood friend of lead guitarist Ron Asheton, and was a member of the group during the time in which the band played at Ungano's Club in New York City, from which the release Have Some Fun: Live At Ungano's was taken. His tenure in the band was relatively short-lived, being an official member of The Stooges from August 1970 until December of the same year, when James Williamson, a founding member of Asheton's high school garage rock band The Chosen Few and Cheatham's roommate at the time, replaced him, and due to his greater technical proficiency on the instrument shared lead guitar and songwriting duties with Asheton, with Cheatham reprising his role as a roadie for the band until their initial dissolution in May 1971, and remaining a lifelong friend of both Asheton and his brother Scott Asheton, as well as remaining close to original bassist Dave Alexander prior to his death in 1975. Following the conclusion of his musical career, Cheatham became a Freemason, and was the Master of the Ann Arbor, Michigan lodge in 1980.

== Personal life and death ==
Cheatham was married and had two daughters and granddaughter's, prior to his passing in 1997. His cause of death was not disclosed.
