= Skydog Records =

Skydog Records was an independent record label established in Paris, France, in 1972 by Marc Zermati and Pieter Meulenbrocks.

Its first release was of a jam session between Jimi Hendrix, Jim Morrison, and Johnny Winter, released as Skyhigh. The label also released Grease by the Flamin' Groovies, as well as LPs by Kim Fowley and British band Ducks Deluxe. In 1976, the label became known internationally with the release of Metallic K.O. by Iggy and the Stooges, a "semi-official" recording owned by James Williamson of the band, of a purportedly 1974 performance (later revealed to comprise parts of two separate shows).

The label also issued, in 1976, a single of two early tracks by Lou Reed, "You're Driving Me Insane" and "Cycle Annie", released as by "Velour Souterrain". Skydog also linked with Stiff Records in the UK to release records by the Damned and Motörhead. Zermati set up Bizarre Distribution, an independent record distribution company, and actively promoted punk rock music in France by organising the 1976 festival at Mont-de-Marsan. The label also signed French punk band Shakin' Street, who later signed to CBS.

After Bizarre Distribution collapsed, Skydog relaunched in 1983 with new releases by the Flamin' Groovies, The Flying Padovanis, and Walter Lure, among others. By the 1990s, the label reissued some of its recordings on CD, and in 2003 released a compilation CD, Skydog Poubelles.
