= Jimmy Recca =

American musician (born 1953)

Jimmy Recca (born 1953) is an American musician known as a former bass player in The Stooges via an incarnation that existed from early 1971 until their first break-up on July 9, 1971.

After Zeke Zettner, a roadie for The Stooges, temporarily filled the vacant bass player slot in the band for a few months, including at their famous gig at the Ungano’s club in New York City, new co-lead guitarist James Williamson brought in Recca, who replaced original Stooges bassist Dave Alexander. This line-up featured Recca on bass supporting both Ron Asheton and James Williamson on twin lead guitars.

Recca was also a member of The New Order, the Los Angeles–based "Detroit super-group" that former Stooges guitarist Ron Asheton founded in early 1975 after the implosion of The Stooges. The band featured ex-MC5 drummer Dennis "Machine Gun" Thompson, former Stooges keyboardist Scott Thurston, and various other Detroit protopunk veterans.

Jimmy Recca has also been listed as "Jimi Recca" on some releases. During his time in The Stooges, the band had three members named James: James Osterberg (Iggy), James Williamson, and Recca.
