= The Stooges (album) =

1969 debut album by the Stooges

Studio album by the Stooges
- Released: August 5, 1969
- Recorded: April 1969
- Studios: The Hit Factory, New York City
- Genres: Proto-punk; garage rock; hard rock
- Length: 34:33
- Label: Elektra
- Producer: John Cale

The Stooges chronology
The Stooges (1969)	Fun House (1970)

Alternative cover
- 2020 "Vinyl Me, Please" reissue with the rejected John Cale mixes

Singles from The Stooges
- 1. "I Wanna Be Your Dog" Released: July 1969; 2. "1969" Released: 1969

The Stooges is the self-titled debut studio album by American rock band the Stooges, released on August 5, 1969, by Elektra Records. Considered a landmark proto-punk release, the album peaked at number 106 on the US Billboard Top 200 Albums chart. The tracks "I Wanna Be Your Dog" and "1969" were released as singles; "1969" was featured on Rolling Stone's list of the "100 Greatest Guitar Songs" at number 35. In 2020, the album was ranked number 488 on Rolling Stone's 500 Greatest Albums of All Time.

== Background and recording ==
For their first album, the Stooges had intended to record seven songs: "I'm Sick", "Asthma Attack", "The Dance Of Romance" / "Goodbye Bozos", "No Fun", "I Wanna Be Your Dog", and "1969". "I'm Sick" was a bolero that Iggy Pop had written on a Wurlitzer electronic piano and when performed live he would flop around on the stage going, "I'm sick! I'm siiiick! I'm sick! Blah!". "Asthma Attack" was a completely different composition than the version of the song utilizing the same song title that appears on the album reissue. According to Iggy Pop, "['Asthma Attack'] was a structured piece of repetitive descending chording that sounded a lot like 'Interstellar Overdrive.'" He elaborates further, "And it was B, A, G, E. Like a Who thing – and then I would wheeze and say, 'asthma attack.'" "Dance of the Romance" / "Goodbye Bozos" was an early version of what became known as "Little Doll" without the Ron Asheton guitar audio feedback cacophony known as "Goodbye Bozos" that originally ended the Psychedelic Stooges live performances of 1968.

"No Fun" took inspiration from the Johnny Cash country song "I Walk The Line" and the main guitar riff to "I Wanna Be Your Dog" took inspiration from the opening guitar riff to "Highway Chile" by the Jimi Hendrix Experience. Early versions of all seven songs were initially written from mid-late 1968 and early 1969. These seven songs were staples—and essentially the basis—of the Stooges' 1968 and early 1969 live set at the time. A typical Stooges song of the period would involve either two minutes of composed song followed by several minutes of improvisation or avant-garde, free-form workouts. However, having assumed that the seven songs as normally performed would cover requirements for the album, the Stooges were told by their record label Elektra that they needed more material. Jac Holzman, head of Elektra Records, is quoted having said to the band at The Hit Factory recording studio, "Are those three tracks ('1969', 'I Wanna Be Your Dog', 'No Fun') all you have? Do you guys have enough material? Do you have more songs?" Ron Asheton replied, "Yeah, we just showed you one part of the pie. We've got several more songs." Jac Holzman then reportedly said, "Good to hear. You fellas have 5 days." The band wrote three completely new compositions over the course of the five day recording sessions to complete the album. The songs were "We Will Fall" (based upon a musical chant by Dave Alexander), "Real Cool Time", and "Not Right".

== Production ==
After producer John Cale informed the band that they needed "one more song to complete the album", Iggy revised and extended "Ann", which was the first song he wrote for the Stooges and had been initially discarded by the band in 1968. Iggy Pop's vocal fragments such as chants, howls, screams, and yelps were lifted from three of the four improvisational avant-garde instrumental jam session recordings, and edited into pre-existing original songs with only the recording "Goodbye Bozos" of the two part "Dance Of The Romance" / "Goodbye Bozos" being completely discarded. The recording "I'm Sick" was now subsumed into the composition "Ann" and tacked on as a musical coda after the main song piece. "Dance Of The Romance", based upon the Bo Diddley beat, with an additional chord sequence and structured lyric now became revised as "Little Doll".

An initial mix by John Cale was rejected by Elektra. The mix as heard on the final product was done by Iggy Pop and Elektra president Jac Holzman. Four of Cale's original mixes would later appear on the bonus disc of a 2005 reissued version, with pitch correction applied to them. Five years later, all eight Cale mixes were released unaltered on the first disc of a 2010 collector's edition release of the album.

== Reception and legacy ==
Professional ratings
Review scores
Source	Rating
AllMusic	(Note: The album received 5 stars when included as part of The Stooges/Funhouse compilation album.)
Blender	5/5 stars
Chicago Tribune	3.5/4 stars
Entertainment Weekly	B+
Pitchfork	8.9/10
Q	4/5 stars
The Rolling Stone Album Guide	4/5 stars
Spin Alternative Record Guide	10/10
Uncut	5/5 stars
The Village Voice	B+

According to music historian Denise Sullivan, The Stooges was "disavowed" by most critics; Sullivan nonetheless called it "a rock'n'roll classic". In a contemporary review, Edmund O. Ward of Rolling Stone called it "loud, boring, tasteless, unimaginative and childish", while conceding that he "kind of liked it". Robert Christgau gave it a backhanded compliment in his column for The Village Voice, deeming it "stupid-rock at its best", but did give it a "B+" grade overall.

In retrospect, Will Hodgkinson called The Stooges "charged and brutal garage-rock", and Pitchfork critic Joe Tangari said it was one of the essential forerunners to the punk rock movement of the 1970s. It and the Stooges' next two albums were later deemed "proto-punk landmarks", according to Mojo journalist Manish Agarwal. Daryl Easlea, writing for BBC Music, called the album "rock at its most primordial. ... [the] album is the original punk rock rush on record, a long-held well-kept secret by those in the know." Mark Deming of AllMusic commented, "Part of the fun of The Stooges is, then as now, the band managed the difficult feat of sounding ahead of their time and entirely out of their time, all at once."

Tyler Kane of Paste magazine assessed: "The band's self-titled effort introduced the spastic, howling Iggy Pop behind a studio-tamed backing band." According to Phillip Sherburne of Pitchfork: "The album is unabashedly savage, fuzzy as a moldy peach, subtle as a hangover. Nevertheless, John Cale's production on the album harnesses just enough studio magic to make them sound positively otherworldly, from the swollen low end, dark as a bruise, to the blown-out sonics of Ron Asheton's guitar solos. Throughout, in unexpected pockets of silence, handclaps pop like fireworks."

In 2003, the album was placed at number 185 on Rolling Stone's list of the "500 Greatest Albums of All Time", maintaining the rating in its 2012 revised list, and dropping to number 488 in its 2020 list. The magazine also included "1969" in their list of the "100 Greatest Guitar Songs of All Time". Seth Jacobson, writing in 1001 Albums You Must Hear Before You Die, said that the album was "a collection of brilliant curios, which were neither full-on garage rock, nor out-and-out dirge." In 2005, Q magazine placed "I Wanna Be Your Dog" at number 13 in its list of the "100 Greatest Guitar Tracks".

Slash of Guns N' Roses noted it as one of his 15 his favorite studio albums. Michael Gira of Swans listed it as one of his 13 favorite albums.

== Reissues ==
On August 16, 2005, Elektra and Rhino Records jointly re-issued the album as a specially-priced double CD, with a remastered version of the album on disc one and alternate takes on disc two. On May 7, 2010, Rhino again released the album in their "Handmade" series as a collector's package including two CDs, a 7" record and a 7"x7"-sized booklet. The first disc features the main songs, the single version of "I Wanna Be Your Dog", and all original John Cale mixes of the eight songs. The second disc, and both sides of the 7" single, contain the previously unissued "Asthma Attack", a staple of the group's early live shows.

On November 8, 2019, Rhino released the 50th Anniversary Super Deluxe Edition of the album on digital services and streaming platforms. This "2019 Remaster" version mirrors the contents of the 2010 double-disc set and includes John Cale's rejected mix of the original album, released at the correct speed for the first time. In 2020, Vinyl Me, Please reissued the album on vinyl using the rejected John Cale mixes. This was the first time the tracks have ever appeared on a vinyl pressing.

== Track listing ==
=== Original release ===
All tracks are written by The Stooges.

Side A
No.	Title	Length
1.	"1969"	4:05
2.	"I Wanna Be Your Dog"	3:09
3.	"We Will Fall"	10:18

Side B
No.	Title	Length
1.	"No Fun"	5:14
2.	"Real Cool Time"	2:29
3.	"Ann"	3:00
4.	"Not Right"	2:50
5.	"Little Doll"	3:20

Notes

- All track titles are stylized in all lowercase on original release.

=== 2005 reissue ===
Bonus disc
No.	Title	Length
1.	"No Fun" (Original John Cale Mix)	4:43
2.	"1969" (Original John Cale Mix)	2:45
3.	"I Wanna Be Your Dog" (Original John Cale mix)	3:26
4.	"Little Doll" (Original John Cale Mix)	2:49
5.	"1969" (Alternate Vocal)	4:47
6.	"I Wanna Be Your Dog" (Alternate Vocal)	3:28
7.	"Not Right" (Alternate Vocal)	3:12
8.	"Real Cool Time" (Alternate Mix)	3:22
9.	"Ann" (Full Version)	7:52
10.	"No Fun" (Full Version)	6:49

=== 2010 collector's edition ===
Bonus tracks
No.	Title	Length
9.	"I Wanna Be Your Dog" (Single Version)	3:10
10.	"1969" (Original John Cale Mix)	2:57
11.	"Not Right" (Original John Cale Mix)	2:37
12.	"We Will Fall" (Original John Cale Mix)	11:10
13.	"No Fun" (Original John Cale Mix)	4:42
14.	"Real Cool Time" (Original John Cale Mix)	2:40
15.	"Ann" (Original John Cale Mix)	3:15
16.	"Little Doll" (Original John Cale Mix)	3:05
17.	"I Wanna Be Your Dog" (Original John Cale Mix)	3:42

Bonus disc
No.	Title	Length
1.	"Asthma Attack" (Album Version)	6:26
2.	"1969" (Alternate Vocal)	4:45
3.	"I Wanna Be Your Dog" (Alternate Vocal)	3:28
4.	"We Will Fall" (Alternate Vocal)	11:24
5.	"No Fun" (Full Version)	6:49
6.	"Real Cool Time" (Takes 1 & 2)	7:04
7.	"Ann" (Full Version)	8:00
8.	"Not Right" (Alternate Vocal)	3:08
9.	"Little Doll" (Takes 1–5)	10:24

=== 2020 reissue ===
Vinyl Me, Please John Cale Mix
No.	Title	Length
1.	"1969"	2:45
2.	"Not Right"	2:27
3.	"We Will Fall"	10:22
4.	"No Fun"	4:41
5.	"Real Cool Time"	2:34
6.	"Ann"	3:01
7.	"Little Doll"	2:52
8.	"I Wanna Be Your Dog"	3:27

== Personnel ==
The Stooges

- Iggy Stooge – vocals, handclaps
- Ron Asheton – guitar, handclaps
- Dave Alexander – bass, handclaps, vocals on "We Will Fall"
- Scott Asheton – drums, handclaps

Additional personnel

- John Cale – piano, sleigh bell on "I Wanna Be Your Dog", viola on "We Will Fall", production

Technical personnel

- Joel Brodsky – sleeve photography
- Danny Fields – liner notes (original album and 1989 CD release only)
- William S. Harvey – sleeve art direction
- Jac Holzman – production supervisor

2005 reissue personnel

- Bill Inglot – remastering
- Ben Edmonds – liner notes
- Dan Hersch – remastering
- Alice Cooper – liner notes

== Bibliography ==
- Dimery, Robert (2006). "The Stooges: The Stooges". In Dimery, Robert (ed.). 1001 Albums You Must Hear Before You Die. Universe Publishing. ISBN 0-7893-1371-5.
- Hodgkinson, Will (2006). Guitar Man. Da Capo Press. ISBN 0306815141.
- Reynolds, Simon (2007). "Ono, Eno, Arto: Nonmusicians and the Emergence of Concept Rock". In Molon, Dominic (ed.). Sympathy for the Devil: Art and Rock and Roll Since 1967. Yale University Press. ISBN 978-0300134261.
- Rubin, Mike (1995). "Stooges". In Weisbard, Eric; Marks, Craig (eds.). Spin Alternative Record Guide. Vintage Books. ISBN 0-679-75574-8.
- Seward, Scott (2004). "The Stooges". In Brackett, Nathan; Hoard, Christian (eds.). The New Rolling Stone Album Guide (4th ed.). Simon & Schuster. ISBN 0-7432-0169-8.
- Sullivan, Denise (2004). The White Stripes: Sweethearts of the Blues. Hal Leonard Corporation. ISBN 1617802271.
