= Heavy Liquid (album) =

Box set by The Stooges
- Released: 2005
- Recorded: July–October 1972, 1973, 1974
- Genre: Protopunk, punk rock
- Length: 5:59:00
- Label: Easy Action Records

The Stooges chronology
Skull Ring (2003)	Heavy Liquid (2005)	The Weirdness (2007)

Professional ratings
Review scores
Source	Rating
Allmusic	Link

Heavy Liquid is a six-CD limited edition boxed set that chronicles the rehearsals and sessions for Raw Power, the third album by rock band The Stooges. Spanning 1972–1974 it also contains live recordings and interviews.

== Description ==
Heavy Liquid was compiled from many tapes, including a recently discovered multi-track master tape that held every note and snippet of studio dialogue from July 1972, plus another recently discovered ¼" tape from March 1973. These two particular tapes were the main reason to get this boxed set since most of the other material had been released in semi-legal releases in various countries.

Three and a fourth partial of the six CDs in the box set hold every note, word, and sound from the sessions. The sessions discs span from spring of 1972 to July 1973.

== Reception ==
Heavy Liquid was cited as one of the Reissues of the Year for 2005 by The Wire magazine.

== Track listing ==
Disc one: The Olympic Studio Tapes, London, July 1972
No.	Title	Length
1.	"I Got a Right" (no guitar solo)	3:37
2.	"I Got a Right" (take #2 false start, no guitar solo)	0:39
3.	"I Got a Right"	3:10
4.	"Gimme Some Skin" (instrumental)	2:41
5.	"Gimme Some Skin"	2:48
6.	"I Got a Right" (instrumental)	3:44
7.	"I Got a Right" (includes guitar solo)	2:49
8.	"I Got a Right" (retake #2 instrumental, Leslied guitar, no solo, Scotty checks drums sound)	4:13
9.	"Louie Louie"	2:55
10.	"I Got a Right" (too slow)	1:00
11.	"I Got a Right" (two false starts)	4:12
12.	"I Got a Right" (not Leslied, no solo)	3:39
13.	"Money"	2:37
14.	"I Got a Right" (false starts)	1:25
15.	"I Got a Right" (different lyrics outro)	2:51
16.	"I Got a Right" (includes solo)	3:07
17.	"I Got a Right" (different drums, includes solo)	2:54
18.	"I'm Sick of You" (recorded London 1972, bonus track)	6:51
19.	"Tight Pants" (recorded London 1972, bonus track)	2:08
20.	"Scene of the Crime" (recorded London 1972, bonus track)	2:53

Disc two: Morgan Sound Studios, Ypsilanti, Michigan, March 1973
No.	Title	Length
1.	"Raw Power" (take 1)	0:27
2.	"Raw Power" (take 2)	6:17
3.	"Head On Curve" (take 1)	1:25
4.	"Head on Curve" (take 2)	6:37
5.	"I Need Somebody / Sweet Child / I Like the Way You Walk"	17:57
6.	"Search & Destroy"	5:01
7.	"Can't Turn You Loose"	1:25
8.	"I Need Somebody" (version 2)	6:52
9.	"Head On Curve" (version 2)	7:08
10.	"Gimme Danger"	8:02

Disc three: Los Angeles & Detroit Rehearsals, Spring 1973
No.	Title	Length
1.	"Raw Power"	4:39
2.	"Head On"	5:08
3.	"Wild Love"	5:06
4.	"Till the End of the Night"	6:58
5.	"Cock in My Pocket"	3:52
6.	"Gimme Danger"	5:55
7.	"Death Trip"	5:44
8.	"Search & Destroy"	3:50
9.	"How It Hurts (Rubber Legs)"	4:17
10.	"Johanna"	8:42
11.	"Open Up & Bleed"	4:58
12.	"Born in a Trailer"	7:26
13.	"Jesus Loves The Stooges"	4:24
14.	"Untitled (Hey Baby)"	3:34
15.	"She Creatures of the Hollywood Hills"	4:43

Disc four: The Return to New York: CBS Studios Rehearsals, July 1973
No.	Title	Length
1.	"Rubber Legs"	5:24
2.	"Cock in My Pocket"	3:52
3.	"Head On Curve"	5:42
4.	"Johanna"	4:37
5.	"Open Up & Bleed"	4:54
6.	"Cry for Me / Pinpoint Eyes"	6:46
7.	"Rubber Legs #2"	5:42

Disc four: The Return to New York: Live at Max's Kansas City, 30th July 1973
No.	Title	Length
8.	"Raw Power"	4:20
9.	"Head On"	6:00
10.	"Gimme Danger"	7:09
11.	"Cock in My Pocket"	4:14
12.	"Search & Destroy"	5:20
13.	"I Need Somebody"	5:02
14.	"Heavy Liquid"	5:43

Disc five: Whiskey A Go Go, Los Angeles, 17th October 1973 (First Set)
No.	Title	Length
1.	"Raw Power"	5:46
2.	"Head On"	8:29
3.	"Gimme Danger"	8:39
4.	"Search & Destroy"	4:53
5.	"I Need Somebody"	5:56
6.	"Heavy Liquid"	6:10
7.	"Cock In My Pocket"	3:57
8.	"Open Up & Bleed"	11:58

Disc six: 1974 E.P.: Bimbos 365 Club, San Francisco, January 1974
No.	Title	Length
1.	"Head On"	10:48
2.	"Wet My Bed"	6:02
3.	"I Got Nothing"	4:39
4.	"Open Up & Bleed"	12:38
5.	"Dick Clark Interview"	1:58
