= The Stooges =

American punk rock band

- The Stooges in 1969; L–R: Scott Asheton, Ron Asheton, Dave Alexander and Iggy Stooge

Background information
- Also known as: Iggy and the Stooges; Iggy Pop and the Stooges; the Psychedelic Stooges
- Origin: Ann Arbor, Michigan, U.S.
- Genres: Proto-punk; garage rock; hard rock; punk rock
- Years active: 1967–1971; 1972–1974; 2003–2016
- Labels: Elektra; Columbia; Virgin
- Past members: Iggy Pop; Scott Asheton; Ron Asheton; Dave Alexander; Bill Cheatham; Steve Mackay; James Williamson; Zeke Zettner; Jimmy Recca; Bob Sheff; Scott Thurston; Tornado Turner; Mike Watt; Toby Dammit
- Website: iggyandthestoogesmusic.com

The Stooges (also known as Iggy and the Stooges) were an American rock band formed in Ann Arbor, Michigan, in 1967 by singer Iggy Pop, guitarist Ron Asheton, drummer Scott Asheton, and bassist Dave Alexander. Initially playing a raw, primitive style of rock and roll, the band sold few records in their original incarnation and gained a reputation for their confrontational performances, which sometimes involved acts of stage diving and self-mutilation by Iggy Pop.

After releasing two albums – The Stooges (1969) and Fun House (1970) – the group disbanded briefly, and reformed with an altered lineup (with Ron Asheton replacing Dave Alexander on bass and James Williamson taking up guitar) to release a third album, Raw Power (1973), before breaking up again in 1974. The band reunited in 2003 with Ron Asheton moving back to guitar and Mike Watt on bass, and the addition of saxophonist Steve Mackay, who had played saxophone on Fun House. Ron Asheton died in 2009 and was replaced by James Williamson, and the band continued to play shows until 2013, when they also released their last album, Ready to Die. The Stooges formally announced their breakup in 2016 due to the deaths of Scott Asheton and saxophonist Steve Mackay.

The Stooges are widely regarded as a seminal proto-punk act. The band was inducted into the Rock and Roll Hall of Fame in 2010. In 2004, Rolling Stone ranked them 78th on their list of the 100 greatest artists of all time. In 2007, they were awarded the Mojo Lifetime Achievement Award at the Mojo Awards.

== History ==
=== Formation (1967–1968) ===
Iggy Pop (born James Newell Osterberg) played drums in several Ann Arbor–area bands as a teenager, including the Iguanas and, later, the Prime Movers. The Prime Movers nicknamed Osterberg "Iggy" in reference to his earlier band.

Osterberg was first inspired to form the Stooges after meeting blues drummer Sam Lay during a visit to Chicago. Upon returning to Detroit, Osterberg sought to create a new form of blues music that was not derivative of historical precedents, with influence from garage rock bands the Sonics and the Kinks. Ron Asheton (guitar) and Scott Asheton (drums), and Dave Alexander (bass guitar) comprised the rest of the band, with Osterberg as the main singer. Osterberg became interested in Ron Asheton after seeing him perform in a cover band called the Chosen Few, believing, "I've never met a convincing musician that didn't look kind of ill and kind of dirty, and Ron had those two things covered!" The three nicknamed Osterberg "Pop" after a local character whom he resembled. Shortly after witnessing an MC5 concert in Ann Arbor, Osterberg began using the stage name Iggy Pop, a name that he has used ever since.

Though the Stooges had formed, Iggy Pop attributes two key motivating influences to move the band forward. The first was seeing the Doors perform at a homecoming dance for the University of Michigan. The second was seeing an all-girls rock band from Princeton, New Jersey, called the Untouchable perform in the summer of 1967. In a 1995 interview with Bust Magazine, he relates:

I had the Stooges. And we did not have the balls to get out and do it. There were two things that made us do it; one was seeing that show (the Doors), we saw that show and I just thought, well, this is so brazen, there is no excuse for us not to do it anymore. And the other thing was we went to New York. We had gone to New York a couple of months before that just to check out the scene, and we had never been to a place like New York ... we went down around Eighth Street there where all the young tourists hang out, and we met these girls from New Jersey, from Princeton, they had a band called the Untouchable, and we're like, "Oh, you've got a band, sure, ha ha ha," and they said "Well, come to our house and see us play." And we didn't have anywhere to crash, and they played for us, and they completely rocked, and we were really ashamed.

The band's 1967 debut was at their communal State Street house on Halloween night, followed by their next live gig in January 1968. During this early period, the Stooges were originally billed as the "Psychedelic Stooges" at the Grande Ballroom in Detroit, and other venues, where they played with the band MC5 and others. At one of their early Grande Ballroom performances, Asheton's guitar neck separated from the body forcing the band to stop playing during the opening song, "I Wanna Be Your Dog". The first major commercial show for the Psychedelic Stooges was on March 3, 1968, at the Grande Ballroom, opening for Blood, Sweat & Tears. According to John Sinclair, who booked the show, the Psychedelic Stooges were substitutes for the MC5, who had a formidable Detroit reputation that made Blood, Sweat & Tears reluctant to follow them. A fan who saw several of their performances at that time said, "What they achieved was an almost orchestral drone or trance-like sound which was totally unique, valid and impressive."

The group's early sound differed from their later music, wrote critic Edwin Pouncey:

The Stooges' early musical experiments were more avant garde than punk rock, with Pop incorporating such household objects as a vacuum cleaner and a blender into an intense wall of feedback that one observer described as sounding like "an airplane was landing in the room." Homemade instruments were also incorporated to flesh out the overall sound. The 'Jim-a-phone' involved pushing feedback through a funnel device which was raised and lowered to achieve the best effect. There was also a cheap Hawaiian guitar which Pop and guitarist Ron Asheton would take turns in plucking to produce a simulated sitar drone, while drummer Scott Asheton pounded away at a set of oil drums with a ball hammer.

In 1968, Elektra Records sent DJ/publicist Danny Fields to scout the MC5, resulting in contracts for both that band and the Stooges. The contracts were at different pay rates: MC5 $20,000, the Stooges $5,000, as revealed in the 2016 Jim Jarmusch film, Gimme Danger.

=== The Stooges, Fun House, and first breakup (1969–1971) ===
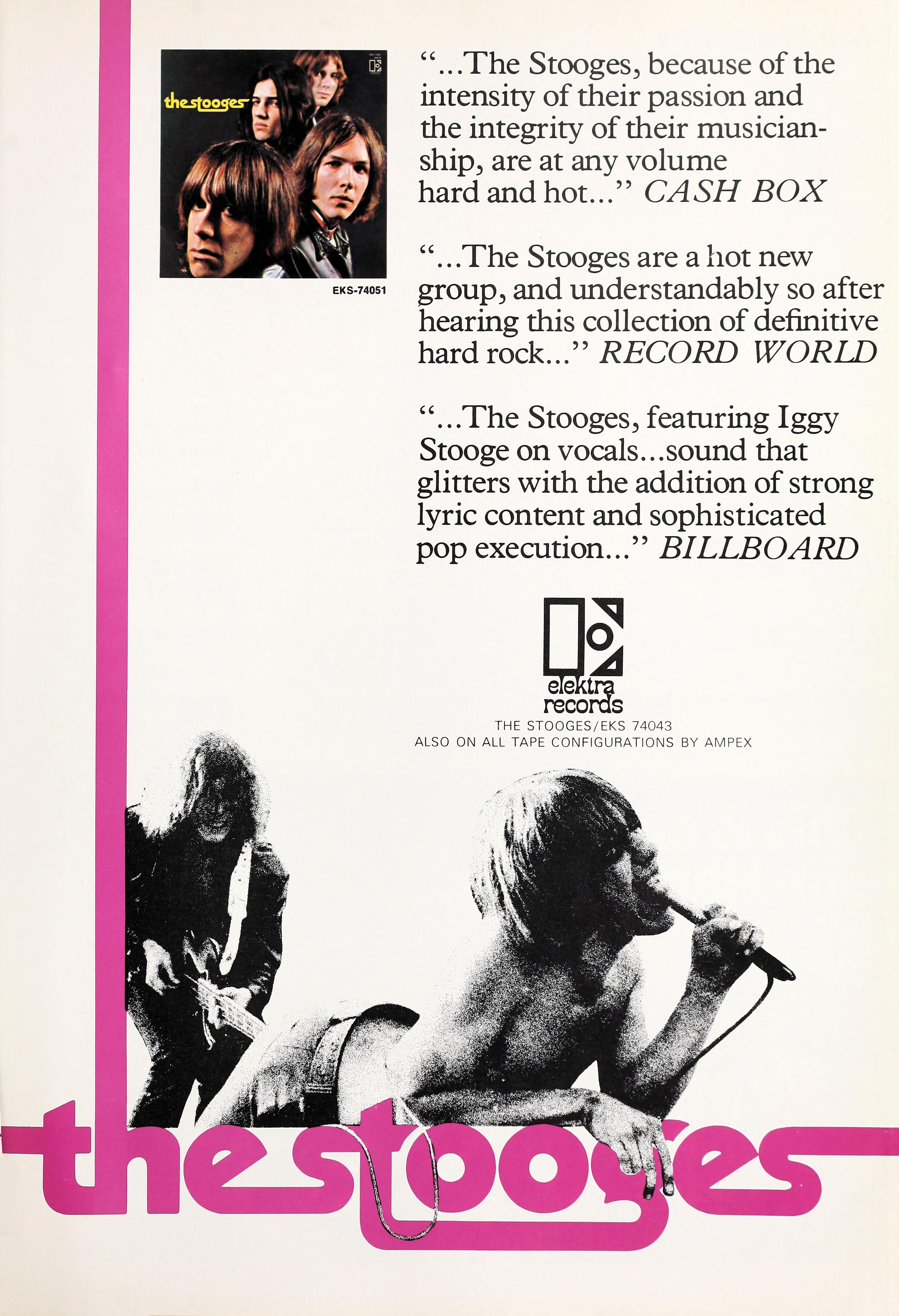
Cashbox advertisement, August 30, 1969

In 1969, the band released their self-titled debut album; sales were low and it was not well received by critics at the time. The Stooges soon gained a reputation for their wild, primitive live performances. Pop, especially, became known for his outrageous onstage behavior: smearing his bare chest with hamburger meat and peanut butter, cutting himself with shards of glass, and flashing his genitalia to the audience. Pop is sometimes credited with the invention or popularization of stage diving.

In 1970, their second album, Fun House, was released, featuring the addition of saxophonist Steve Mackay. On June 13 of that year, television recorded the band at the Cincinnati Pop Festival. While performing the songs "T.V. Eye" and "1970", Pop leaped into the crowd, where he was hoisted up on people's hands, and proceeded to smear peanut butter all over his chest. In a broadcast interview at WNUR Northwestern University radio station in Evanston, Illinois, in 1984, Stiv Bators of the Lords of the New Church and the Dead Boys confirmed the long-standing rumor that it was he who had provided the peanut butter, having carried a large tub from his home in Youngstown, Ohio, and handing it up to Iggy from the audience.

Fun House was also poorly received by critics and the general public. Alexander was dismissed in August 1970 after arriving at the Goose Lake International Music Festival too drunk to play. He was replaced by a succession of new bass players, including former roadie Zeke Zettner and James Recca. Around this time, the band expanded their lineup by adding a second guitar player, roadie Bill Cheatham, who was eventually replaced by James Williamson, a childhood friend of the Ashetons and Alexander.

By this time, the Stooges, with the notable exception of Ron Asheton, had all become serious heroin users. The drug was introduced to the band by new manager John Adams. Their performances became even more unpredictable, and Pop often had trouble standing up on stage due to his extreme drug abuse. Elektra soon eliminated the Stooges from its roster, and the band had a hiatus for several months. The final lineup was Pop, the Asheton brothers, Recca and Williamson.

The breakup of the Stooges was formally announced on July 9, 1971. With the band having broken up, Pop met David Bowie on September 7, 1971, at Max's Kansas City, and the pair quickly became good friends. The next day, on the advice of Bowie, Pop signed a recording contract with pop music manager Tony DeFries' company, MainMan. A few months later, Tony DeFries and Pop met Clive Davis from CBS/Columbia Records and got a two-album recording deal.

=== Raw Power and second breakup (1972–1974) ===
In March 1972, DeFries brought Pop and Williamson to the UK, and the pair attempted to reconstitute the Stooges with British musicians, but after finding no suitable additions, they brought the Asheton brothers back into the band. (This "second choice" decision rankled Ron Asheton, as did his change from guitar to bass.) This lineup, billed as Iggy & the Stooges, recorded their third album, the influential Raw Power, which was released in 1973.

At the time, the album faced the criticism that Bowie had mixed it poorly. (In subsequent years, various unofficial fan recordings were assembled and released as the album Rough Power; in 1997, the album was re-mixed by Iggy Pop and re-released.) Although the album sold rather poorly and was regarded as a commercial failure at the time of its release, Raw Power would go on to gain recognition from early punk rockers.

With the addition of a piano player (briefly Bob Sheff and then Scott Thurston), the Stooges toured for several months, starting in February 1973. Around this time they also made a number of recordings that became known as the Detroit Rehearsal Tapes, including a number of new songs that might have been included on a fourth studio album, had the band not been dropped by Columbia soon after the release of Raw Power. In 1973, James Williamson was briefly dismissed due to criticism from the band's management company (likely pertaining to his tempestuous relationship with Cyrinda Foxe, a close friend of road manager Leee Black Childers); guitarist Tornado Turner replaced him for a single gig (on June 15, 1973, at the Aragon Ballroom in Chicago), but Williamson soon returned to the group.

The Stooges disbanded in February 1974 as a result of dwindling professional opportunities; this factor was compounded by Pop's ever-present heroin addiction and erratic off-stage behavior. The last half of the band's last performance of this era on February 9, 1974, in Detroit, Michigan, was captured and was released in 1976 as the live album Metallic K.O., along with the first half of an earlier show on October 6, 1973, at the same venue. A 1988 expanded release of the album with the title Metallic 2X K.O. included the other two halves of each show. In 1998, the album was re-released under the original title with the order of the shows reversed, (mostly) expanded tracks and more complete set lists.

=== Post-breakup and reunion (1975–2003) ===
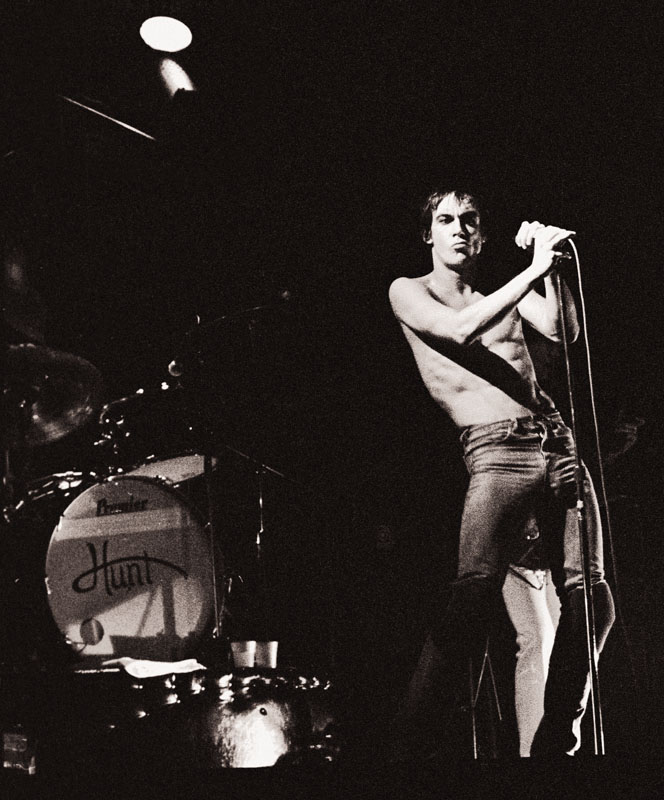
Iggy Pop on October 25, 1977, at the State Theatre, Minneapolis, Minnesota

After his first attempt at drug rehabilitation, Pop began a volatile yet ultimately successful solo career in 1977, commencing with the Bowie-produced albums The Idiot (1977) and Lust for Life (1977). Relocated to Los Angeles, California, Ron Asheton formed the short-lived band the New Order (not to be confused with the UK band New Order) with Stooges alumni Recca and Thurston before performing with the Ann Arbor–based "anti-rock" group Destroy All Monsters from 1977 to 1985. Until the Stooges' reformation, he supported himself as a working musician in various ensembles, including New Race, Dark Carnival and the Empty Set. Williamson worked with Pop as a producer and engineer during his early solo career – the Kill City and New Values albums are a product of this collaboration – but began a long break from the music industry in favor of a career in electronics engineering beginning in 1980. He received his degree from California State Polytechnic University, Pomona in 1982 and retired from Sony as vice president of technical standards in 2009. Scott Asheton performed with Sonic's Rendezvous Band and the Scott Morgan Group while pursuing various day jobs. Dave Alexander died of pulmonary edema related to his alcohol-induced pancreatitis in 1975.

In 1997, a reissue of Raw Power remixed by Pop was released. In 1999, reissue label Rhino Handmade released the seven-disc box set 1970: The Complete Fun House Sessions, composed of the entire recording sessions associated with the Fun House album. 3,000 copies were pressed, selling out in less than a year.

In 2000, indie rock music veterans J Mascis (of Dinosaur Jr) and Mike Watt (of the Minutemen and Firehose) teamed up with Ron Asheton and drummer George Berz to perform Stooges covers (and other material) live. Billed as J. Mascis and the Fog, the band performed sporadically before Pop became aware of them in 2003. Pop and the Ashetons also first reunited that year, sharing four songs on the Skull Ring album with Pop on vocals, Scott Asheton on drums, and Ron Asheton on both guitar and bass. Soon afterward, the Stooges reunited officially, performing a series of live shows in the United States and Europe, with Watt on bass at Ron Asheton's request, and Fun House–era saxophonist Steve Mackay. Their Detroit homecoming show, postponed by the 2003 North America blackout, was released as the DVD Live in Detroit.

=== The Weirdness, Ron Asheton's death, and James Williamson's return (2004–2009) ===
On August 16, 2005, Elektra Records and Rhino Records issued newly remastered two-CD editions of the first two Stooges albums, featuring the original album on disc one and outtakes (including alternate mixes, single versions, etc.) on disc two. Unlike the 1997 Raw Power reissue, which was a total remix from the original multitracks, these remasters are faithful to the original mixes.

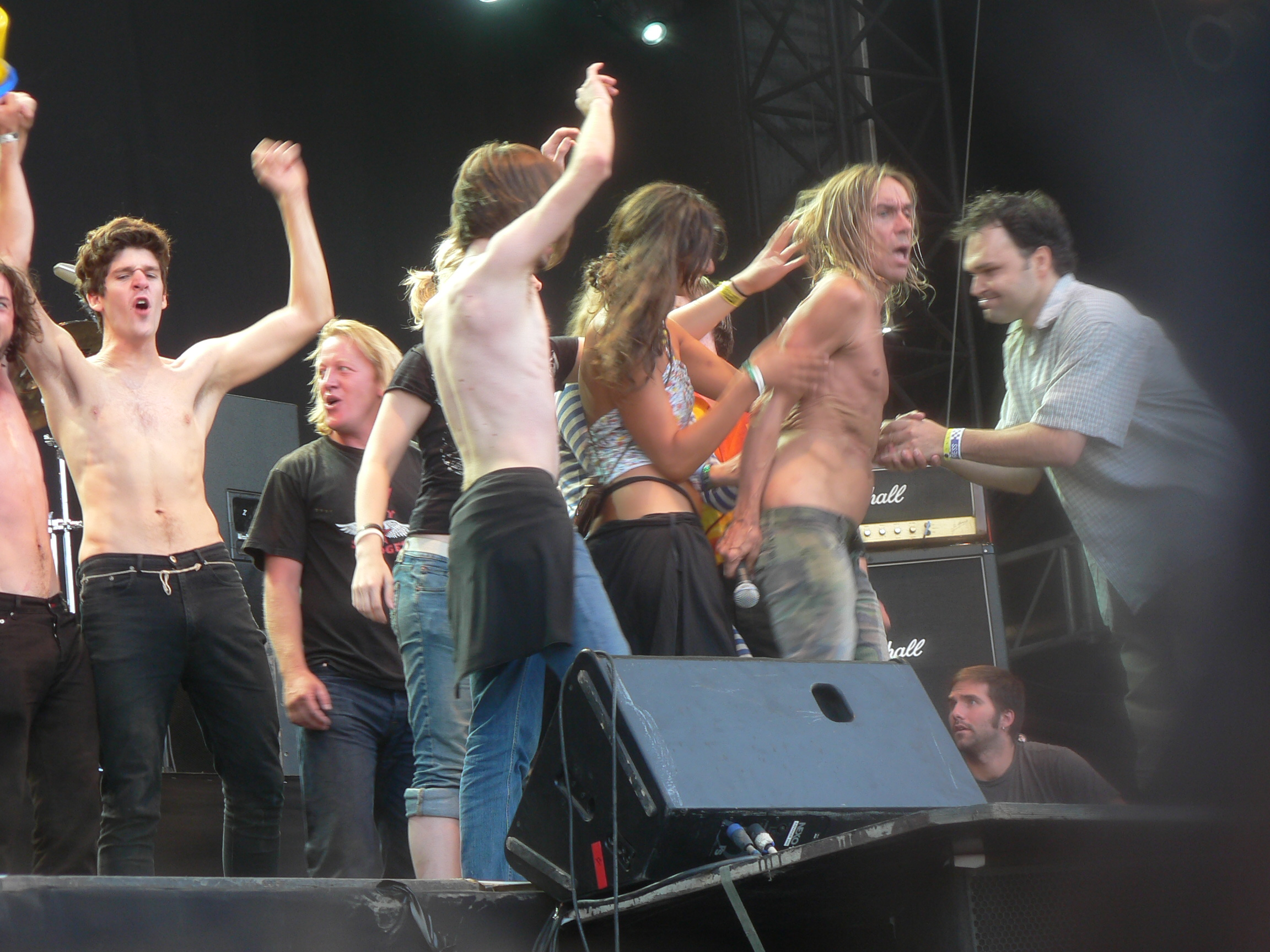
Iggy and the Stooges – Sziget Fesztivál, 2006.

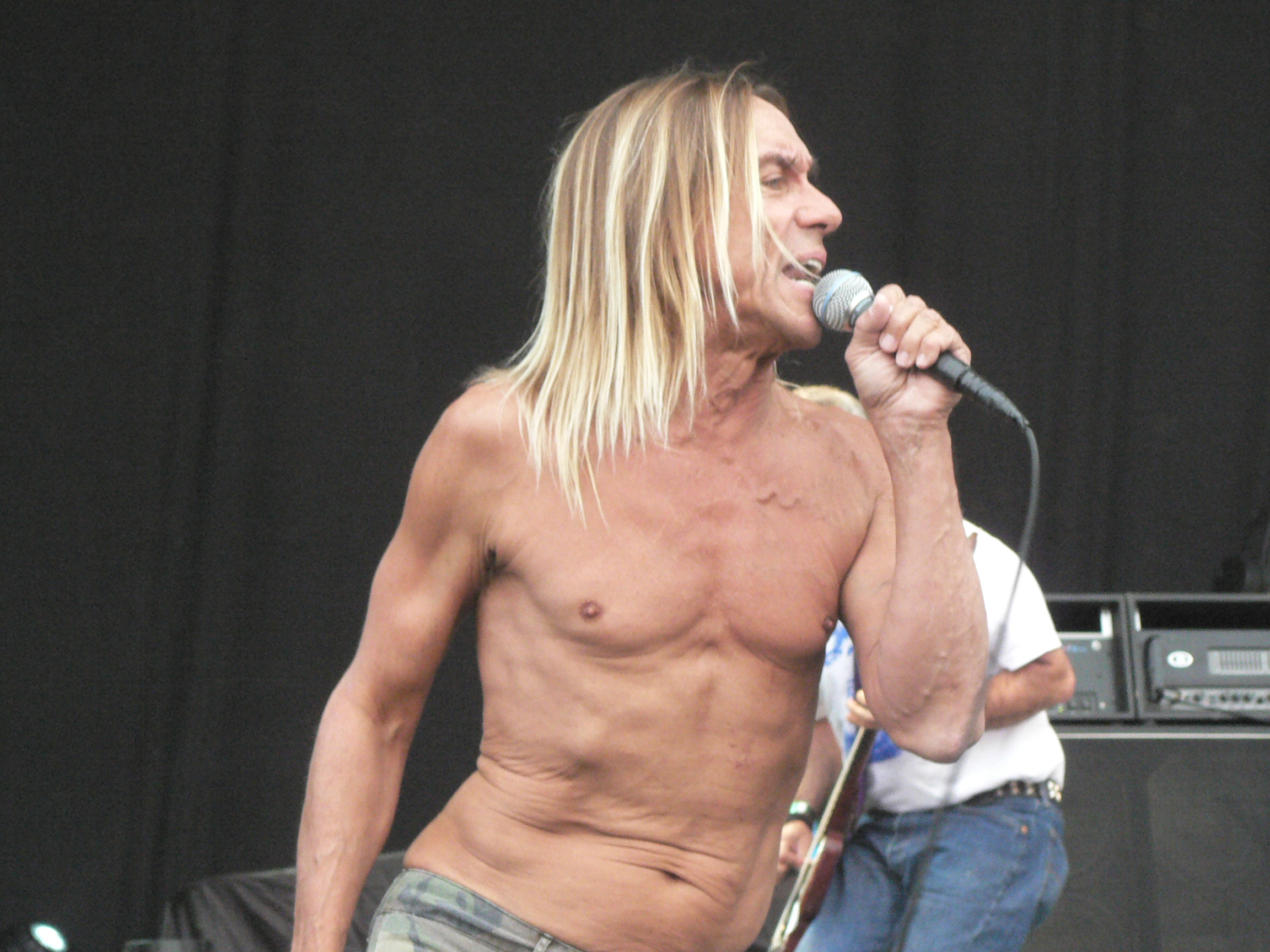
Iggy and the Stooges – Sziget Fesztivál, 2006.

In 2007, the band released an album of all-new material, The Weirdness, with Steve Albini recording, and mastering done at Abbey Road Studios in London, England. The album received mixed reviews from the press. The band also contributed a cover of Junior Kimbrough's "You Better Run" to a tribute album for the late blues artist.

The Stooges were voted into the Michigan Rock and Roll Legends Hall of Fame in 2008.

The Stooges spent the years between 2003 and 2008 touring extensively, playing shows on five different continents. Highlights included performances at several events involved with the All Tomorrow's Parties concert series, Pop's 60th birthday on the stage of San Francisco's Warfield Theater, touring with the Lollapalooza festival, and a performance of two Madonna covers at the Michigan-born singer's induction into the Rock and Roll Hall of Fame in protest of the Stooges' failure to receive an induction into said institution despite six nominations. (Two years later, the band was successfully inducted.) A low of this touring era occurred in August 2008 when the band's equipment was stolen in Montreal, Quebec. Initially, the reunited band's sets consisted solely of material from The Stooges, Fun House, Skull Ring and The Weirdness. By 2008, they had added "Search and Destroy", "I Got a Right" and "Raw Power" to its set lists. The band's final show with Ron Asheton was on September 29, 2008, in Ljubljana, Slovenia.

On January 6, 2009, Ron Asheton was found dead in his home, having reportedly suffered a heart attack several days earlier. He was 60 years old. In their official statement, the group called Asheton "irreplaceable".

On October 1, 2009, The Stooges: The Authorized and Illustrated Story by Robert Matheu and Jeffrey Morgan (authorized biographer of Alice Cooper) was published in hardcover by Abrams.

In a May 2009 interview, Pop announced the band's plans to continue performing with James Williamson returning as guitarist. Pop stated that "although 'the Stooges' died with Ron Asheton, there was still 'Iggy and the Stooges'". Their first concert occurred on November 7, 2009, in São Paulo, Brazil. The band added material from Raw Power and several of Pop's early solo albums to its repertoire.

=== Ready to Die and final breakup (2010–2016) ===
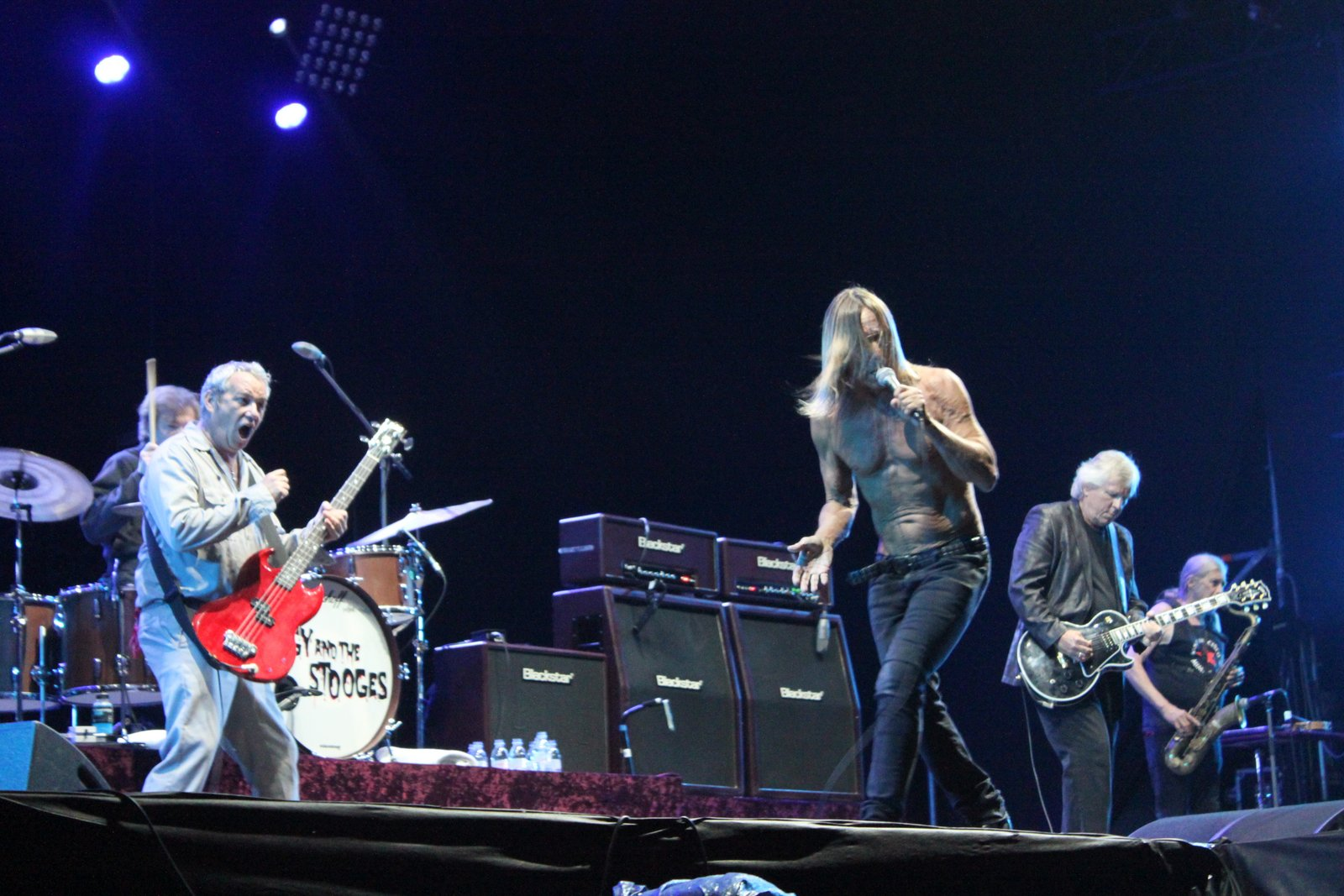
The Stooges, Katowice Off Festival, Poland, on August 4, 2012

The Rock and Roll Hall of Fame inducted the band in its Class of 2010, with Williamson, Pop, Alexander, Scott Asheton, and Ron Asheton as the inducted members. The band had previously been nominated for election seven times, each unsuccessful. Their performance for the event included a guest appearance by former keyboardist Scott Thurston. Performances with Williamson continued, including the 2010 All Tomorrow's Parties festival in Monticello, New York, where they performed Raw Power in its entirety. A re-release of Raw Power was released on April 10, 2010, including the first remastering of the David Bowie mix and a live 1973 performance. The following year, Detroit author Brett Callwood published The Stooges – Head On: A Journey Through The Michigan Underground, a book that focuses heavily on the Asheton brothers' activities after the initial decline of the Stooges.

On February 25, 2013, the band released what would become their last album, Ready to Die. The album was released on April 30 on Fat Possum. Iggy and the Stooges played the final date of their 25-city 2013 world tour with a performance at the C2SV Festival in San Jose on September 28, 2013.

On March 15, 2014, Scott Asheton died of a heart attack, aged 64. Saxophonist Steve Mackay died in October 2015 at the age of 66.

In 2016, Jim Jarmusch directed Gimme Danger, a documentary film about the band.

On June 22, 2016, guitarist Williamson made an official statement for the band saying that the Stooges are no more: "The Stooges is over. Basically, everybody's dead except Iggy and I. So it would be sort of ludicrous to try and tour as Iggy and the Stooges when there's only one Stooge in the band and then you have side guys. That doesn't make any sense to me." Williamson also expressed a desire to stop touring.

== Musical style ==
The Stooges are widely regarded as a seminal proto-punk act and as instrumental in the development of punk rock, alternative rock, heavy metal, and rock music in general. In the years before noise rock was named as a musical genre, the Stooges were combining noise with punk rock in the same vein.

== Legacy ==
The Stooges' brand of rabid proto-punk laid the foundation for countless punk rock bands over the decades. The Sex Pistols recorded the first high-profile Stooges cover, "No Fun", in 1976. Sid Vicious also regularly performed "I Wanna Be Your Dog", "Search and Destroy" and "Shake Appeal (Tight Pants)" in his post-Pistols solo shows, and included both on his Sid Sings album. According to Dee Dee Ramone, the members of the Ramones felt alienated from their community growing up and started hanging out with each other due to a common love of Stooges, a band everyone else they knew greatly disliked. A typical social experience was listening to the Stooges together while miming/imitating a performance by Iggy Pop. Joey Ramone's cover of the song "1969" appeared on his posthumous debut solo album, Don't Worry About Me. The Stooges were also a key early influence on Siouxsie and the Banshees frontwoman Siouxsie Sioux.

Several punk bands took their names from Stooges songs or lyrics, including Radio Birdman, Penetration, Raw Power, Shake Appeal and The Streetwalkin' Cheetahs. Australian band Radio Birdman which included fellow Ann Arbor native Deniz Tek, named an early venue "The Oxford Funhouse", while on their 1977 album Radios Appear, they covered the Stooges song "T.V. Eye" and name-checked the Stooges in the Deniz Tek song "Do the Pop". The band's name was itself taken, although incorrectly, from the lyrics of the Stooges song "1970".

Numerous other bands and artists spanning multiple genres have cited the Stooges as an influence, including Misfits, Sonic Youth, Bauhaus, Dinosaur Jr. frontman J Mascis, the Sisters of Mercy, the Jesus and Mary Chain, Buzzcocks, Ride, Mudhoney, Pere Ubu, Richard Hell and the Voidoids, and Crime. Former Tyrannosaurus Rex percussionist Steve Peregrin Took, interviewed by Charles Shaar Murray for the NME in 1972, cited Pop's stage act as an inspiration for his own chaotic onstage behavior during the band's late 1969 US tour (after which he was replaced by Mickey Finn).

Nirvana frontman Kurt Cobain, who consistently listed Raw Power as his favorite album of all time in the "Favorite Albums" lists that featured in his Journals. Various other artists have cited the Stooges as a favorite of theirs: Layne Staley of Alice in Chains, said that he was a big fan of The Stooges. Slash, of Guns N' Roses, included their self-titled debut amongst his favorite studio albums. Peter Hook of Joy Division and New Order included their live album Metallic K.O. amongst his favorite albums.

The band was championed by music journalist Lester Bangs: his piece "Of Pop and Pies and Fun" for Creem Magazine was published about the time of the Stooges' second album, Fun House. Another music journalist, Legs McNeil, was especially fond of Iggy and the Stooges and championed them in many of his writings.

In August 1995, all three Stooges albums were included in British music magazine Mojo's influential "100 Greatest Albums of All Time" feature. Fun House was placed the highest, at 16. In 2004, Rolling Stone ranked the Stooges No. 78 on their list of 100 of the most influential artists of the past 50 years.

=== Covers ===
Joan Jett covered "I Wanna Be Your Dog" for her platinum 1988 album, Up Your Alley. The first album by British punk band the Damned, Damned Damned Damned, concluded with "I Feel Alright", a cover of the Stooges' "1970" under its accepted alternate title. In 1982, the Birthday Party released Drunk on the Pope's Blood, a live EP with a version of "Loose". On multiple occasions, the Birthday Party performed entire sets of Stooges covers. Their live version of "Fun House" can be found on their live album, Live 1981–82. Sonic Youth covered "I Wanna Be Your Dog" on 1983's Confusion Is Sex. English space rock group Spacemen 3 covered "Little Doll" on their 1986 album Sound of Confusion. Uncle Tupelo covered "I Wanna Be Your Dog", although they did not release it while they were active. In 1993, Guns N' Roses covered the song "Raw Power" on their album The Spaghetti Incident? The Red Hot Chili Peppers recorded a cover of "Search and Destroy" during the sessions for Blood Sugar Sex Magik; the song appeared on the B-side of the "Give It Away" single, and later on the Iggy Pop tribute album We Will Fall, the compilation albums Under the Covers and The Beavis and Butt-Head Experience, and the compilation EP Rock & Roll Hall of Fame Covers EP. They also played "I Wanna Be Your Dog" live. Soundgarden covered "Search and Destroy" on their live album Live on I-5. Thrash metal band Slayer cover "I Wanna Be Your Dog" on their 1996 cover album Undisputed Attitude (naming it "I'm Gonna Be Your God"). Rage Against the Machine covered the song "Down on the Street" on their 2000 album, Renegades. In 2007, R.E.M. performed "I Wanna Be Your Dog" with Patti Smith in their induction to the Rock and Roll Hall of Fame.

The Stooges' "Search and Destroy" was featured in Harmonix's Guitar Hero II for the PlayStation 2.

Emanuel covered "Search and Destroy" on the Tony Hawk's American Wasteland soundtrack.

In 2009, Cage the Elephant gave away a free cover version of "I Wanna Be Your Dog" on their website if users registered with their mailing list service.

== Band members ==
=== Final lineup ===
Image	Name	Years active	Instruments	Release contributions
	Iggy Pop	1967–1971; 1972–1974; 2003–2016	lead vocals; keyboards (1972–1973)	all releases
	James Williamson	1970–1971; 1972–1974; 2009–2016	lead and rhythm guitar; backing vocals (1972–1974)	Raw Power (1973); Metallic K.O. (1976); Live at the Whiskey a Go-Go (1988); Open Up and Bleed (1995); all releases from You Don't Want My Name... You Want My Action (2009) onwards, except Have Some Fun: Live at Unganos (2010), Live at Goose Lake, August 8th, 1970 (2020)
	Mike Watt	2003–2016	bass guitar	all releases from Live in Detroit (2003) onwards, except You Don't Want My Name... You Want My Action (2009), Have Some Fun: Live at Unganos (2010), Live at Goose Lake, August 8th, 1970 (2020)
	Toby Dammit (Larry Mullins)	2011–2016	drums; percussion	Ready to Die (2013)

=== Former members ===
Image	Name	Years active	Instruments	Release contributions
	Scott Asheton	1967–1971; 1972–1974; 2003–2014 (until his death)	drums	all releases
	Ron Asheton	1967–1971; 1972–1974; 2003–2009 (until his death)	lead and rhythm guitar (1967–1971, 2003–2009); bass guitar (1972–1974); backing vocals (1967–1969, 1972–1974)	all releases from The Stooges (1969) to Have Some Fun: Live at Ungano's (2010)
	Dave Alexander	1967–1970 (died 1975)	bass guitar; backing vocals (1969)	The Stooges (1969); Fun House (1970)
	Steve Mackay	1970; 2003–2015 (until his death)	saxophone	Fun House (1970); all releases from Live in Detroit (2003) onwards, You Don't Want My Name... You Want My Action (2009), Have Some Fun: Live at Unganos (2010)
	Bill Cheatham	1970 (died 1997)	rhythm guitar	Have Some Fun: Live at Unganos (2010)
	Zeke Zettner	1970 (died 1973)	bass guitar	Have Some Fun: Live at Unganos (2010)
	Jimmy Recca	1971	bass guitar	You Don't Want My Name... You Want My Action (2009)
	Bob Sheff	1973 (died 2020)	keyboards	none
	Tornado Turner	1973	lead and rhythm guitar	none
	Scott Thurston	1973–1974 (2010, 2013 as guest)	keyboards; harmonica; backing vocals	Metallic K.O. (1976); Live at the Whiskey a Go-Go (1988); Open Up and Bleed (1995); California Bleeding (1997); Double Danger (2000); Michigan Palace (2000); Ready to Die (2013)

== Discography ==
- The Stooges (1969)
- Fun House (1970)
- Raw Power (1973)
- The Weirdness (2007)
- Ready to Die (2013)

== Videography ==
- Live in Detroit (2003)
- Iggy & the Stooges Reunion at Coachella! (2003)
- Escaped Maniacs (2007)
- Gimme Danger (2016)
