= Fun House (The Stooges album) =

Studio album by the Stooges
- Released: July 7, 1970
- Recorded: May 11–25, 1970
- Studios: Elektra, Los Angeles
- Genres: Proto-punk; hard rock; experimental rock; punk jazz; garage rock
- Length: 36:35
- Label: Elektra
- Producer: Don Gallucci

The Stooges chronology
The Stooges (1969)	Fun House (1970)	Raw Power (1973)

Singles from Fun House
- 1. "Down on the Street" / "I Feel Alright (1970)" Released: August 1970

Fun House is the second studio album by the American rock band the Stooges. It was released on July 7, 1970, by Elektra Records. Though initially commercially unsuccessful, Fun House has since developed a strong cult following. Like its predecessor (their 1969 self-titled debut album) and successor (1973's Raw Power), it is considered an integral work in the development of punk rock.

== Recording sessions ==
In 1969, Elektra Records had released the Stooges' debut album to mixed reviews and limited commercial success. Elektra head Jac Holzman believed that the MC5, another Michigan-based band, had more commercial potential than the Stooges. Holzman asked former Kingsmen keyboardist Don Gallucci to produce the Stooges' second album.

Having seen the group live, Gallucci told Holzman that the Stooges were an "interesting group, but I don't think you can get this feeling on tape". Holzman, however, had already reserved recording time for him with the band in Los Angeles. The album was recorded at Elektra Sound Recorders in Los Angeles from May 11 to 25 of 1970. The band stayed at the nearby Tropicana Motel.

Gallucci's plan was to record about a dozen takes of a particular song each day, and then to pick the one that would appear on the album. The first day consisted of soundchecks and run-throughs of all songs, with baffles between the amplifiers and drums and Iggy Pop singing through a studio-style microphone on a boom stand.

The band was not pleased with the resulting sound, and subsequently they and Gallucci stripped the entire studio of its usual equipment and soundproofing to emulate their live performances as closely as possible. Gallucci arranged the band in studio in the way they normally played at a concert, with Pop singing through a handheld dynamic microphone and no baffles between the amplifiers. The results were very raw when compared to contemporary records; for example, without the normal isolation baffles the vibrations from the bass amplifier cause audible rattling of the snare drum on several songs.

"We couldn't play unless it was loud – our limited ability demanded it. The recording was pretty quick: we did a track a day, in the order they appeared on the album, and I don't think we ever did more than four takes of anything. It was pretty extreme for the time and I was proud of it. But I didn't think of it being a loud record. It was just us, and we were loud." – Ron Asheton

Pop declared that blues singer Howlin' Wolf "was really pertinent for me on Fun House. "That stuff is Wolfy, at least as I could do it."

The Stooges intended "Loose" to be the first track, but Elektra felt "Down on the Street" would be the stronger opener. An alternate version of "Down on the Street", featuring a Doors-style organ overdub by Gallucci, was released as a single.

== Music and lyrics ==
At the time of its release, Billboard magazine regarded Fun House as being a hard rock album. Music critic Robert Christgau of The Village Voice characterized the album as "genuinely 'avant-garde' rock" because of the music's apt "repetitiveness", "solitary new-thing saxophone", and the closing track, "L.A. Blues", "trying to make art about chaos by reproducing same." Author Greg Kot has called Fun House a "punk jazz opus," and Tyler Kane of Paste Magazine characterized the album's sound by its "gritty, warts-and-all intensity." In 2020, Jordan Blum of Consequence assessed that the album "largely eschewed the more psychedelic and poppy elements of The Stooges in favor of a harsher, darker, and more investigative mindset (complete with bits of jazz)."

In 1001 Albums You Must Hear Before You Die (2005), music journalist Stevie Chick wrote that the sleazy tales of hedonism and reckless abandon on the album's first half are followed by "the comedown" on the second side, as evoked by looser song structures, Steve Mackay's saxophone, and "Iggy sounding like a scared, lost child, warning from bitter experience that 'The Fun House will steal your heart away.'" "L.A. Blues" concludes the album with a flurry of noise and disoriented dual drumming, which Stylus Magazine's Patrick McNally interpreted as the Stooges being "lost culturally and spiritually in the smoke and riots and confusion of Detroit and America at the dawn of the seventies, but also in the overwhelming squall and clatter of the sound that they—from nothing, from nowhere—managed to create." Kane said this track "sounds like Iggy and the boys crying out for help on the way to the loony bin—only this time, they’re using shrieking guitars; harsh, stick-splintering drums; and Pop’s unmistakable wail."

== Critical reception ==
Retrospective professional ratings
Review scores
Source	Rating
AllMusic	5/5 stars
Chicago Tribune	4/4 stars
Christgau's Record Guide	A−
Entertainment Weekly	A+
Mojo	5/5 stars
Pitchfork	9.4/10
Q	4/5 stars
The Rolling Stone Album Guide	5/5 stars
Spin Alternative Record Guide	10/10
Uncut	5/5 stars

In contemporaneous reviews, Charles Burton from Rolling Stone found Fun House to be "much more sophisticated" than the Stooges' debut album, writing that they sounded "so exquisitely horrible and down and out that they are the ultimate psychedelic rock band in 1970". Roy Hollingworth of Melody Maker was unimpressed however, calling it the worst record of the year and "a muddy load of sluggish, unimaginative rubbish heavily disguised by electricity and called American rock". Robert Christgau wrote in his original review for The Village Voice that the Stooges' successful use of repetition and incorporation of saxophone had intellectual appeal, but questioned whether it was healthy as a listener for "[me] to have to be in a certain mood of desperate abandon before I can get on with them musically". He later said his criticism had been based on the album's "inaccessibility" as popular music, and wrote in Christgau's Record Guide: Rock Albums of the Seventies (1981):

Now I regret all the times I've used words like 'power' and 'energy' to describe rock and roll, because this is what such rhetoric should have been saved for. Shall I compare it to an atom bomb? a wrecker's ball? a hydroelectric plant? Language wasn't designed for the job.

In retrospective reviews, Fun House is considered as a classic garage rock album, AllMusic's Mark Deming hailed Fun House as "the ideal document of the Stooges at their raw, sweaty, howling peak", and wrote that it features better songs than their debut, adept playing from each member, and Don Gallucci's energetic and immediate production. Dalton Ross of Entertainment Weekly wrote that the "radical" album sounded "primal, unpredictable, dangerous". Pitchfork critic Joe Tangari felt that the music's aggression has rarely been matched. He recommended it to "any rock fan with a sense of history" and asserted that, along with the Stooges' debut, Fun House is one of the most important predecessors to the punk rock movement. Barney Hoskyns called it a "proto-punk classic", and Jon Young of Spin hailed it as a "proto-punk landmark" that possessed a "magnificent chaos". According to Cleveland.com writer Troy L. Smith, "What was once dismissed as something too raw and primal, now sits as a work of unparalleled hard-rock genius", while music historian Simon Reynolds says "it clearly stands out as the most powerful hard-rock album of all time."

In 2003, Rolling Stone ranked Fun House number 191 on their list of 500 Greatest Albums of All Time, maintaining the rating in a 2012 revision, and moving it up to number 94 in the 2020 reboot of the list. Melody Maker said that it is, "no contest, the greatest rock n' roll album of all time". Lenny Kaye, writing for eMusic, called it a "rock and roll classic" and "one of the most frontal, aggressive, and joyously manic records ever". In The Rolling Stone Album Guide (2004), Scott Seward claimed that, although saying so "risks hyperbole", Fun House is "one of the greatest rock & roll records of all time" and that, "as great as they were, the Stones never went so deep, the Beatles never sounded so alive, and anyone would have a hard time matching Iggy Pop's ferocity as a vocalist." Commenting on the initial poor reception the record received from critics, radio and Elektra themselves, Reynolds explained: "Fun House was fatally out of synch with 1970, the downbeat year it came out, a year of singer-songwriters and tasty, bluesy licks. Only a few people then had any time for the sound of absolute abandon that The Stooges were making, or unleashing."

Rolling Stone listed Fun House at number 8 of the "100 Greatest Punk Albums of All Time" iin 2026.

== Legacy and influence ==
Australian band Radio Birdman chose their name based on mishearing the line "radio burnin' up above" in the song "1970". They also named their Oxford Street performance venue The Oxford Funhouse and covered "TV Eye" on their 1977 album Radios Appear.

John Zorn covered "T.V. Eye" for the compilation Rubáiyát: Elektra's 40th Anniversary: the same song was also covered for the 1998 film Velvet Goldmine by a supergroup featuring Stooges guitarist Ron Asheton, members of Sonic Youth, and Ewan McGregor. The Birthday Party covered "Loose" on their 1982 live album Drunk on the Pope's Blood and, also live, the song "Funhouse": a version with sax played by J.G. Thirlwell appears on the 1999 CD The Birthday Party Live 81–82. the Damned's 1977 debut album, Damned Damned Damned, features a cover of "1970", entitled "I Feel Alright". Depeche Mode covered "Dirt" on their I Feel Loved single. GBH covered "1970" (as "I Feel Alright") on their third album City Babys Revenge. A live version of "1970" appears on Mission of Burma's posthumous live album The Horrible Truth About Burma. "1969" goth-rock band The Sisters of Mercy in Alice EP, 1983. Hanoi Rocks cover "1970" (titled "I Feel Alright") on their 1984 live album All Those Wasted Years. Japanese rock band Sheena & The Rokkets covered "1970" with new lyrics and entitled "Omae Ga Hoshi (One More Time)" on their 1979 album "真空パック (Vacuum Pack)". Spacemen 3 adapted "T.V. Eye" into the near-cover "OD Catastrophe" on their debut album Sound of Confusion. Michael Monroe also covered the song for his Another Night in the Sun live album in 2010. In 1989 indie rock band Blake Babies covered "Loose" for their album Earwig. They sampled Pop's voice into the song. Rage Against the Machine recorded "Down on the Street" for their 2000 covers album Renegades, and the main riff from their song "Sleep Now in the Fire" was inspired by the one in "T.V. Eye." A cover of "Dirt" appears on disc one of Screeching Weasel's 1999 double CD compilation Thank You Very Little.

In 2010, Nigerian songwriter Billy Bao and his band went into the studio exactly 40 years after the recording of the album and recorded their album Buildings from Bilbao using all titles and song times for their own songs (except "1970", which is updated as "2010", and "L.A. Blues", which is called "LAGOS Blues"). "Down on the Street" briefly appears on the song "Maggot Death (Live at Brighton)" off of the Throbbing Gristle album The Second Annual Report, as a field recording of a club playing the song over the P.A. system.

Joey Ramone, Mark E. Smith, Jack White, Nick Cave, Michael Gira, Buzz Osborne, Aaron North, Henry Rollins and Steve Albini. are among the artists who cited Fun House as a favourite album. "The greatest rock 'n' roll record ever made," enthused White. "It is a brilliant, brilliant record. I don't think it'll ever be topped."

In 1999, Rhino Records released a limited edition box set, 1970: The Complete Fun House Sessions, featuring every take of every song from every day of the recording sessions, plus the single versions of "Down on the Street" and "1970". On August 16, 2005, the album was reissued by Elektra and Rhino as a two-CD set featuring a newly remastered version of the album on disc one and outtakes (essentially highlights from the Complete Fun House Sessions box set). Contributing a quote to Pop biographer Paul Trynka's liner notes for the reissue, Jack White dubbed Fun House "by proxy the definitive rock album of America".

In 2005, the Stooges performed the album live in its entirety as part of the All Tomorrow's Parties-curated Don't Look Back series. "Dirt" was ranked number 46 on Gibson's "Top 50 Guitar Solos" list in 2010.

In 2020, Jordan Blum of Consequence wrote: "Fun House accomplished precisely what a sophomore LP should: it continued the foundational vibe of its predecessor while also adding more growth and variety to the band’s palette. [...] Although it wasn’t immediately successful, it has since achieved quite a legacy as not only one of The Stooges’ best outings, but as a quintessential blueprint for what would become punk half a decade later."

The title track was on the soundtrack to the 2004 video game MTX Mototrax, "1970" appeared in Tony Hawk's Underground 2 the same year and "Down on the Street" appeared in Battlefield: Hardline in 2015 and Grand Theft Auto Online in 2020 during The Cayo Perico Heist Update on the station K.U.L.T 99.1 FM

The album had sold 89,000 copies through March 2000.

== Track listing ==
=== Original release ===
All tracks are written by The Stooges (Dave Alexander, Ron Asheton, Scott Asheton, and Iggy Pop).

Side one
No.	Title	Length
1.	"Down on the Street"	3:42
2.	"Loose"	3:34
3.	"T.V. Eye"	4:16
4.	"Dirt"	7:00

Side two
No.	Title	Length
1.	"1970"	5:14
2.	"Fun House"	7:45
3.	"L.A. Blues"	4:52

=== 2005 reissue ===
Disc two
No.	Title	Length
8.	"T.V. Eye" (Takes 7 & 8)	6:01
9.	"Loose" (Demo)	1:16
10.	"Loose" (Take 2)	3:42
11.	"Loose" (Take 22)	3:42
12.	"Lost in the Future" (Take 1)	5:50
13.	"Down on the Street" (Take 1)	2:22
14.	"Down on the Street" (Take 8)	4:10
15.	"Dirt" (Take 10)	7:09
16.	"Slide (Slidin' the Blues)" (Take 1)	4:38
17.	"1970" (Take 3)	7:29
18.	"Fun House" (Take 2)	9:30
19.	"Fun House" (Take 3)	11:29
20.	"Down on the Street" (Single mix)	2:43
21.	"1970" (Single mix)	3:21

== Personnel ==
The Stooges

- Iggy Pop – vocals
- Ron Asheton – guitar
- Dave Alexander – bass
- Scott Asheton – drums
- Steve Mackay – tenor saxophone (5–7)

Technical

- Don Gallucci – production, organ on single version of "Down on the Street"
- Brian Ross-Myring – remastering, engineer
- Tom Hummer – assistant engineer

== Charts ==
Chart performance for Fun House
Chart (2025)	Peak position
Hungarian Physical Albums (MAHASZ)	20

== See also ==
- 1970: The Complete Fun House Sessions

== Bibliography ==
- Chick, Stevie (2010). "The Stooges: Fun House". In Dimery, Robert (ed.). 1001 Albums You Must Hear Before You Die. Universe Publishing. ISBN 978-0789320742.
- Christgau, Robert (1981). Christgau's Record Guide: Rock Albums of the Seventies. Ticknor and Fields. ISBN 0-89919-026-X.
- Hoskyns, Barney (2009). Waiting for the Sun: A Rock 'n' Roll History of Los Angeles. Hal Leonard Corporation. ISBN 978-0879309435.
- Rubin, Mike (1995). "Stooges". In Weisbard, Eric; Marks, Craig (eds.). Spin Alternative Record Guide. Vintage Books. ISBN 0-679-75574-8.
- Seward, Scott (2004). "The Stooges". In Brackett, Nathan; Hoard, Christian (eds.). The New Rolling Stone Album Guide (4th ed.). Simon & Schuster. ISBN 0-7432-0169-8.
