= Dave Alexander (musician) =

American musician (1947–1975)

- Alexander in 1969

Background information
- Born: David Michael Alexander; June 3, 1947; Whitmore Lake, Michigan, U.S.
- Died: February 10, 1975 (aged 27) Ann Arbor, Michigan, U.S.
- Genres: Hard rock; garage rock; proto-punk
- Occupations: Musician; songwriter
- Instruments: Bass guitar
- Years active: 1967–1970
- Label: Elektra
- Formerly of: The Stooges

David Michael Alexander (June 3, 1947 – February 10, 1975) was an American musician, best known as the original bassist for influential proto-punk band The Stooges. He was posthumously inducted into the Rock and Roll Hall of Fame in 2010 as a member of The Stooges.

== Biography ==
After his family relocated to Ann Arbor, Michigan, from Whitmore Lake, Michigan, Alexander attended Pioneer High School in Ann Arbor, where he met brothers Ron and Scott Asheton. "Zander" (as Alexander was known) dropped out after 45 minutes on the first day of his senior year in 1965 to win a bet. Later in 1965, Ron sold his motorcycle and then went to England to see The Who and to "try and find The Beatles".

Alexander and the Asheton brothers soon met Iggy Pop and formed The Stooges in 1967. Although Alexander was a total novice on his instrument, he was a quick learner and subsequently had a hand in arranging, composing and performing all of the songs that appeared on the band's first two albums, The Stooges and Fun House. He is often credited by Pop and was credited by the late Ron Asheton in interviews with being the primary composer of the music for the Stooges songs "We Will Fall", "Little Doll" (both on The Stooges), "Dirt" and "1970" (both on Fun House).

Alexander was fired from the band in August 1970 due to performing whilst intoxicated at their appearance at the Goose Lake International Music Festival. After his dismissal, Alexander was replaced by bassists Zeke Zettner and Jimmy Recca, though Ron Asheton played bass on the first studio album post-Alexander, Raw Power. Alexander remained close friends with both Asheton brothers, as well as with Bill Cheatham, who was a roadie and high school friend of both Alexander and the Asheton brothers. Alexander did not join another band after his dismissal from The Stooges, instead mainly relying on money made from investments made in the stock market to make ends meet.

== Death and tribute ==
Alexander died of pulmonary edema in 1975, at the age of 27 in Ann Arbor, after being admitted to a hospital for pancreatitis, which was linked to his alcoholism. During The Stooges' induction into the Rock and Roll Hall of Fame in 2010, Iggy Pop paid tribute to Alexander during his speech.

== References in songs ==
Mike Watt mentions Alexander by name in his song "The Angel's Gate," on his 2004 album The Secondman's Middle Stand, by which time Watt had replaced Alexander in the reformed Stooges. At Watt's first performance with the Stooges at the Coachella Valley Music and Arts Festival in May 2003, he wore a Dave Alexander t-shirt as a tribute.

Iggy Pop references Alexander in the spoken intro to "Dum Dum Boys" on his 1977 album The Idiot:

How about Dave?
OD'd on alcohol

== Discography ==
=== With The Stooges ===
- The Stooges (1969)
- Fun House (1970)

== See also ==
- 27 Club
