= Scott Asheton =

American drummer (1949–2014)

- Asheton in 1969

Background information
- Also known as: Scott "Rock Action" Asheton
- Born: August 16, 1949; Washington, D.C., U.S.
- Died: March 15, 2014 (aged 64) Ann Arbor, Michigan, U.S.
- Genres: Proto-punk; garage rock; hard rock; punk rock
- Occupation: Drummer
- Years active: 1967–2014
- Formerly of: The Stooges; Sonic's Rendezvous Band; Scott Morgan Band; Scots Pirates

Scott Randolph Asheton (August 16, 1949 – March 15, 2014) was an American musician, best known as the drummer for the rock band the Stooges.

== Biography ==
Asheton was born in Washington, D.C., and moved to Ann Arbor, Michigan, with his family at the age of 14. He co-formed the Stooges in 1967 along with his older brother Ron Asheton, Iggy Pop, and Dave Alexander. The primitive sound that Asheton made was a template for many punk bands to come. The original incarnation of the band released two LPs on Elektra Records before moving through several lineup changes, releasing a third LP on Columbia Records in 1973 and disbanding the following year.

During the Stooges' separation he was among the few ex-members to play again with Pop, with the mini-reunion occurring during a 1978 European tour which also included Scott Thurston. Asheton also played drums with Scott Morgan in different bands, among which were the Scott Morgan Band, Scots Pirates and most notably Sonic's Rendezvous Band. He also recorded extensively with Sonny Vincent, playing drums on four full studio albums along with Captain Sensible on bass, as well as making special guest appearances on other Vincent releases. In addition to recording with Sonny, Asheton toured the U.S. and Europe with Sonny and Steve Baise (on bass) of the Devil Dogs. The Stooges reformed in 2003, and remained active until 2016, releasing a fourth album in 2007. Following the death of Ron Asheton, the group worked later with guitarist James Williamson. Other than Iggy Pop, Asheton was the only consistent member of the Stooges after the death of his brother, guitarist Ron Asheton, in 2009.

After the Hellfest Festival show of June 17, 2011, he went into temporary retirement from live duty. He was replaced by Larry Mullins (a.k.a. Toby Dammit), who had played in Iggy Pop's band in the 1990s.

== Death ==
Asheton died of a heart attack in March 2014 at the age of 64. He was survived by his daughter, Leanna Asheton, his wife Elizabeth, stepsons Simon and Aaron Wallis, and his sister Kathleen Asheton. In a statement on Asheton's death, Pop said: "He was like my brother".

== Discography ==
=== With the Stooges ===
- The Stooges (1969)
- Fun House (1970)
- Raw Power (1973)
- The Weirdness (2007)
- Ready to Die (2013)
- Rock Action Scotty Morgan 1988
