= Cat Power discography =

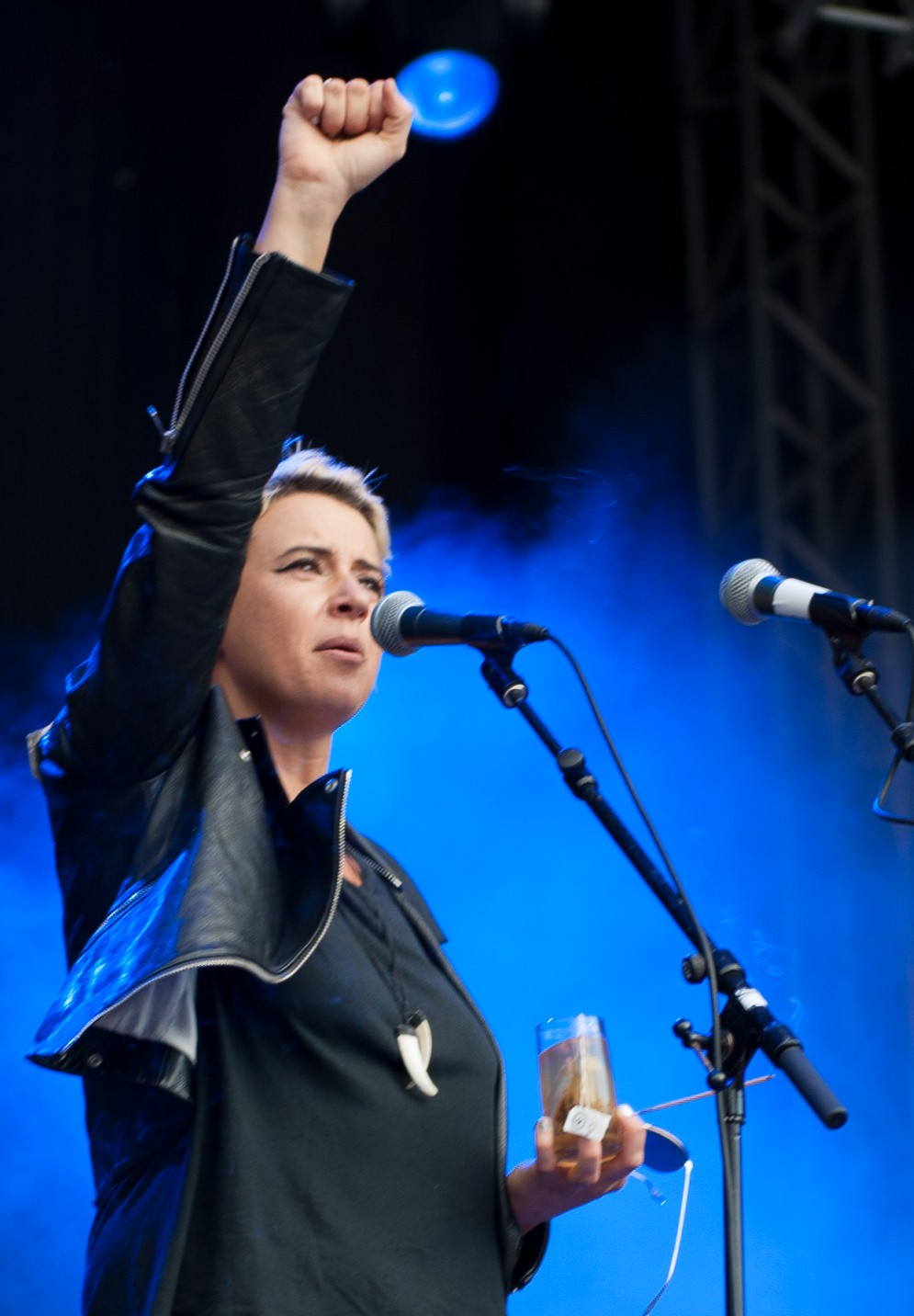
- Studio albums: 11
- Extended plays: 4
- Live albums: 1
- Singles: 23

The discography of the American singer-songwriter Cat Power consists of eleven studio albums, one live album, five EPs, eleven commercial singles, twelve promotional singles, two singles as a featured artist, and numerous music videos.

== Albums ==
=== Studio albums ===
List of studio albums, with selected chart positions and certifications
Title	Album details	Peak chart positions										Sales
Title	Album details	US	AUS	BEL (FL)	BEL (WA)	FRA	IRL	NOR	SWE	SWI	UK	Sales
Dear Sir	Released: October 23, 1995; Label: Runt; Formats: CD · LP	—	—	—	—	—	—	—	—	—	—	
Myra Lee	Released: March 4, 1996; Label: Smells Like; Formats: CD	—	—	—	—	—	—	—	—	—	—	
What Would the Community Think	Released: September 10, 1996; Label: Matador; Formats: CD · LP	—	—	—	—	—	—	—	—	—	—	
Moon Pix	Released: September 22, 1998; Label: Matador; Formats: CD · LP	—	—	—	—	163	—	—	—	—	—	US: 63,000
The Covers Record	Released: March 21, 2000; Label: Matador; Formats: CD · LP	— (Note: The Covers Record did not enter the Billboard 200, but peaked at number 44 on the Top Heatseekers chart.)	—	—	—	—	—	—	—	—	—	US: 52,000
You Are Free	Released: February 18, 2003; Label: Matador; Formats: CD · LP	105	71	—	—	67	—	—	—	—	157	US: 163,000; Europe: 30,000
The Greatest	Released: January 20, 2006; Label: Matador; Formats: CD · LP	34	25	25	56	20	44	35	50	57	45	US: 125,000; Europe: 100,000+
Jukebox	Released: January 22, 2008; Label: Matador; Formats: CD · LP · DL	12	35	7	34	4	35	30	27	20	32	US: 137,000; Europe: 100,000
Sun	Released: August 29, 2012; Label: Matador; Formats: CD · LP · DL	10	26	5	20	7	46	18	15	9	33	US: 114,000; Europe: 60,000+
Wanderer	Released: October 5, 2018; Label: Domino; Formats: CD · LP · DL	96	42	24	31	19	71	—	45	11	29	
Covers	Released: January 14, 2022; Label: Domino; Formats: CD · LP · DL	—	—	24	38	35	—	—	—	12	—	
"—" denotes the album failed to chart or was not released.

=== Live albums ===
List of live albums, with selected details
Title	Album details	Peak chart positions	
Title	Album details	BEL (FL)	BEL (WA)
Cat Power Sings Dylan: The 1966 Royal Albert Hall Concert	Released: November 10, 2023; Label: Domino; Formats: CD · LP · DL	127	70

== EPs ==
List of EPs with additional information
Title	Details	Peak chart positions	Further information
Title	Details	FRA	Further information
Undercover	Released: November 10, 1996; Label: Undercover Records; Format: 7"	—	Track listing: 1. "Psychic Hearts"; 2. "We Dance"; 3. "Johnny's Got a Gun"
iTunes Live Session EP	Released: September 5, 2006; Label: Matador; Format: DL	—	Track listing: 1. "Love and Communication (Acoustic Version)"; 2. "House of the Rising Sun"; 3. "Wild Is the Wind"; 4. "Who Knows Where the Time Goes?"
eMusic Session EP	Released: October 3, 2006; Label: Matador; Format: DL	—	Track listing: 1. "The Greatest"; 2. "Remember Me" (Otis Redding); 3. "Ramblin' Man"; 4. "Good Woman"
Dark End of the Street	Released: December 9, 2008; Label: Matador; Formats: 10" · DL	99	Track listing: 1. "Dark End of the Street"; 2. "Fortunate Son"; 3. "Ye Auld Triangle"; 4. "I've Been Loving You Too Long (To Stop Now)"; 5. "Who Knows Where the Time Goes?"; 6. "It Ain't Fair"
Redux	Released: January 23, 2026; Label: Domino; Formats: 10" DL	—	Track listing: 1. "Try Me"; 2. "Could We"; 3. "Nothing Compares 2 U"
"—" denotes an EP which failed to chart or was not released in that territory.

== Singles ==
Title	Year	Peak chart positions				Album
Title	Year	US AAA	US Rock Digital	BEL	FRA	Album
"Nude as the News"	1996	—	—	—	—	What Would the Community Think
"Lived in Bars"	2006	—	—	—	—	The Greatest
"Could We"	2006	—	—	—	—	The Greatest
"Song to Bobby"	2007	—	—	—	—	Jukebox
"King Rides By" (2011 Version) (Note: Released for a limited time on Cat Power's official website. All proceeds from sales of this song were donated to the Festival of Children Foundation, and the Ali Forney Center.)	2011	—	—	—	—	Non-album single
"Ruin"	2012	—	—	38	—	Sun
"Cherokee"	2012	—	—	—	151	Sun
"Have Yourself a Merry Little Christmas" (Note: "Have Yourself a Merry Little Christmas" also charted at number 42 on Billboard's Hot Rock Songs, and at number 72 on the Billboard Holiday 100.)	2013	—	31	—	147	Non-album single
"Wish I Was Here" (Cat Power and Coldplay)	2014	—	41	—	—	Wish I Was Here OST
"Woman" (featuring Lana Del Rey)	2018	20	—	—	—	Wanderer
"—" denotes a single which failed to chart or was not released in that territory.

=== Promotional singles ===
List of singles, showing year released and album name
Title	Year	Album
"Headlights" (Note: Cat Power's debut studio recording, limited to 500 copies and released exclusively on 7" vinyl by New York-based indie label The Making of Americans. This release contained the original, Craig Flanagin-produced versions of "Headlights" and "Darling Said Sir", featuring guitar by Bob Bannister and drums by Glen Thrasher. A re-recorded version of the a-side would later appear as the album closer on Power's 1996 studio album Myra Lee.)	1994	Non-album singles
"Great Expectations" / "Clear the Room" (Note: Limited edition split single with Guv'ner, featuring their cover version of the Cat Power track "Great Expectations" as the a-side, and Power's cover of the Guv'ner track "Clear the Room" as the b-side.)	1996	Non-album singles
"He War" (Note: Limited edition CD single released on April 14, 2003, exclusively in Europe, containing "Good Woman" and "(I Can't Get No) Satisfaction" as b-sides.)	2003	You Are Free
"Free" (Note: Released as an airplay-only single exclusively in the United States in July 2003.)	2003	You Are Free
"The Greatest" / "Hate" (Note: Released worldwide on pink 7" vinyl on December 6, 2005; limited to 1,500 copies.)	2005	The Greatest
"Living Proof" (Note: Released as an airplay-only single exclusively in Sweden on December 15, 2005.)	2005	The Greatest
"Love and Communication" (Note: An exclusive radio edit of the song; released as an airplay-only single in the United States on January 6, 2006.)	2006	The Greatest
"New York" (Note: Airplay-only single (Europe and North America).)	2008	Jukebox
"Back in the Days (for Christopher Wallace)" / "Fire" (Note: Limited edition 7" vinyl single sent as a free gift with orders of the deluxe edition of Sun from Matador Records' website.)	2012	Sun
"Silent Machine" (Note: Released as an airplay-only single exclusively in the United States.)	2013	Sun
"Manhattan" (Note: Released as an airplay-only single exclusively in the United Kingdom.)	2013	Sun
"Bully" (Note: Released for a limited period as a one-track digital single on April 9, 2013.)	2013	Sun

=== As featured artist ===
List of singles as a featured artist, showing primary musician, year released and album
Title	Year	Peak chart positions		Album
Title	Year	BEL	FRA	Album
"Go Up" (Cassius feat. Cat Power and Pharrell Williams)	2016	—	—	Ibifornia
"Action" (Cassius featuring Cat Power and Mike D)	2016	20	114	Ibifornia

== Collaborations and guest appearances ==
- "Pocketful of Sugar", "Pretty Spoiled", "Numbness & Tingling" and "Teenage Boyfriend" on Puss 02 by God Is My Co-Pilot (1995, Dark Beloved Cloud/The Making of Americans) (Marshall and Sharon Topper, God Is My Co-Pilot's lead vocalist, share vocal duties on all of these tracks, except "Teenage Boyfriend", which also features vocals from Yoshimi P-We)
- "Sad, Sad Song" on Transfiguration of Vincent by M. Ward (2003, Merge Records)
- "Haiku Ten" on Sixteen Haiku & Other Stories by Sigmatropic (2003, Thirsty Ear Recordings)
- "My Hoo Haa" on Still Lookin' Good to Me by The Band of Blacky Ranchette (2003, Thrill Jockey)
- "I've Been Thinking" on White People by Handsome Boy Modeling School (2004, Elektra)
- "Do the Romp" (performed by Cat Power with Entrance) on Sunday Nights: The Songs of Junior Kimbrough (2005, Fat Possum Records)
- "Great Waves" on Cinder by Dirty Three (2005, Touch and Go Records)
- "I Love You (Me Either)" (performed by Cat Power & Karen Elson) on Monsieur Gainsbourg Revisited (2006, Barclay Records/Virgin)
- "Disown, Delete" on Ensemble's self-titled album (2006, Fat Cat Records)
- "A Kind of Peace" on To All New Arrivals by Faithless (2006, Cheeky Records/Columbia)
- "Revelations" on Yes, I'm a Witch by Yoko Ono (2007, Apple Records/Astralwerks)
- "Poisenville Kids No Wins / Reprise (This Must Be Our Time)" on I'll Sleep When You're Dead by El-P (2007, Definitive Jux)
- "Orphans" and "Walls" on Modern Guilt by Beck (2008, Interscope)
- "Hold On, Hold On" on Easy Come, Easy Go by Marianne Faithfull (2008, Naïve Records)
- "Coming Through" on Nobody Knows. by Willis Earl Beal (2013, Hot Charity)
- "A Little Help" on The Westerner by John Doe (2016, Cool Rock)

== Soundtrack appearances ==
- "Metal Heart" from Moon Pix was featured on the soundtrack Desert Blue: Music from the Motion Picture (1999, Razor & Tie)
- "Naked, If I Want To" from The Covers Record was featured on Jackpot: Original Soundtrack Album (2001, Milan Records)
- "Paths of Victory" from The Covers Record was featured on Music from the Motion Picture North Country (2005, Sony Music)
- "Cross Bones Style" from Moon Pix was featured on Jim White Presents: Music from Searching For the Wrong-Eyed Jesus (2005, Luaka Bop)
- "I Found a Reason" from The Covers Record was featured on V for Vendetta: Music from the Motion Picture (2006, Astralwerks)
- "Sea of Love" from The Covers Record was featured on Juno: Music from the Motion Picture (2007, Rhino Entertainment)
- "It's Alright to Fail" (original composition written by Jesse Harris and sung by Marshall) appeared on The Hottest State: Music from the Motion Picture (2007, Hickory Records)
- "Stuck Inside of Mobile with the Memphis Blues Again" appeared on I'm Not There: Original Soundtrack (2007, Columbia)
- Exclusive song "Anthem" appeared in the 2015 short film Skateboarding in Pine Ridge.

== Miscellaneous ==
- Album versions of "Nude As The News" and "Back of Your Head" appeared on the 1997 compilation What's Up Matador
- A live version of "We Dance" appeared on the 1999 Kill Rock Stars compilation Drinking from Puddles: A Radio History
- The songs "Cross Bones Style" and "Sea of Love", and music videos for "Cross Bones Style" and "Nude as the News", featured on the 1999 compilation Everything Is Nice - The Matador Records 10th Anniversary Anthology
- Samples of "In This Hole", "Fate of the Human Carbine" and "American Flag" were incorporated into "Archive Fever" by Matmos; a sample of "Back of Your Head" featured on the "Matador Megamix" created by DJ Eclipse, both of which were released on This CD Is Not Nice (1999, Matador Records) (Note: This two-track album was given as a free gift to all attendees of the Matador Records-hosted events 'A Nice Weekend in London' (September 3–5, 1999) and 'A Nice Weekend in New York' (September 23–25, 1999). The album has never received a wider release.)
- The Covers Record out-take "Come On in My Kitchen" (Robert Johnson) appeared on All Tomorrow's Parties 1.1: Sonic Youth Curated (2001, ATP Recordings)
- Live versions of "Good Woman" (as "To Be A Good Woman") and "Troubled Waters" (recorded for Sydney radio station 2SER) appeared on Live & Direct (2001, Spunk)
- You Are Free out-take "The Party" appeared on 2003's Comes with a Smile Vol. 8 - Like Others Need Oxygen and 2004's Matador at Fifteen
- The song "Cross Bones Style" was featured on the podcast "In Plain Sight: Lady Bird Johnson" from ABC News (2021)

== Videos ==
=== DVDs ===
- Speaking for Trees (2004)

=== Films ===
- Speaking for Trees: A Film by Mark Borthwick (2004, Mark Borthwick)

In addition, she appears in two documentary films: The Fearless Freaks (2005, Bradley Beesley) and Two Headed Cow (2006, Tony Gayton); a video installation: Sleepwalkers (2007, Doug Aitken); and two feature films My Blueberry Nights (2007, Wong Kar-wai) and American Widow (2008, C.S. Leigh).

=== Music videos ===
- "Nude As The News" (1997, Brett Vapnek)
- "Cross Bones Style" (1998, Brett Vapnek)
- "He War" (2003, Brett Vapnek)
- "From Fur City" (2003, Jem Cohen)
- "Maybe Not" (2004, Mark Borthwick)
- "Free" (2004, Mark Borthwick)
- "Half of You" (2004, Mark Borthwick)
- w/ Dirty Three - "Great Waves" (2005, Braden King)
- "Maybe Not" (2005, Oliver Pietsch) (spec)
- "Living Proof" (2006, Harmony Korine)
- "Lived in Bars" (2006, Robert Gordon)
- w/ Ensemble - "Disown, Delete" (2006, Karina Garcia Casanova)
- "Where Is My Love?" (version 1) (2006, Anne-Laure Keib)
- "Where Is My Love?" (version 2) (2007, Josh & Xander)

=== Television ===
- Austin City Limits, December 30, 2006
  "The Greatest"
  "Living Proof"
  "Lived in Bars"
  "Could We"
  "I Don't Blame You"
  "Cross Bones Style"
  "(I Can't Get No) Satisfaction"
- "Morning Surprise", De Beers commercial, 2006 Christmas
  "How Can I Tell You" (Adapted cover of Cat Stevens song; not formally released as a single since only 30 seconds were recorded specifically for the commercial)
- Rescue Me 5x13
- Unforgettable
  "New York"

== Songs used in movies ==
- "Maybe Not"
  The Quiet (2005, Jamie Babbit); Everything Is Fine (Tout est parfait) (2008, Yves Christian Fournier)
- "Naked, If I Want To" (Jerry A. Miller Jr.)
  Jackpot (2001, Michael Polish) (as "Naked If I Want To Be")
- "Metal Heart"
  Desert Blue (1998, Morgan J. Freeman)
- "Rockets"
  Trance (1998, Michael Almereyda)
- "I Found a Reason" (Lou Reed)
  Habibti min elskede (2002, Pernille Fischer Christensen); The Secret Lives of Dentists (2002, Alan Rudolph); Saving Face (2004, Alice Wu); Dandelion (2004, Mark Milgard); V for Vendetta (2005, James McTeigue)
- "Sea of Love" (John Phillip Baptiste & George Khoury)
  Subrosa (2000, Helen Lee); Juno (2007, Jason Reitman)
- "In This Hole"
  New Rose Hotel (1998, Abel Ferrara); Under Heaven (1998, Meg Richman); Jackpot (2001, Michael Polish)
- "Paths of Victory" (Bob Dylan)
  North Country (2005, Niki Caro)
- "Cross Bones Style"
  Searching for the Wrong-Eyed Jesus (2005, Andrew Douglas)
- "Nude as the News"
  Winter Passing (2005, Adam Rapp)
- "Troubled Waters" (Sam Coslow & Arthur Johnston)
  Perfect Stranger (2007, James Foley); Everything Is Fine (Tout est parfait) (2008, Yves Christian Fournier)
- "The Greatest"
  My Blueberry Nights (2007); 17 Again (2009); Mammoth (2009); The Family (2013)
- "Living Proof"
  My Blueberry Nights (2007)
- "Werewolf"
  Powder Blue (2009, Timothy Linh Bui); Los abrazos rotos (2009, Pedro Almodóvar)
- Unknown which song(s)
  Vern (2004, Suzi Yoonessi)
