= Sun (Cat Power album) =

Studio album by Cat Power
- Released: August 29, 2012
- Recorded: 2007–2012
- Studios: Bison (Malibu, California); The Boat (Silver Lake, California); Motorbass (Paris); South Beach (Miami)
- Genres: Electronic; pop; dance-rock
- Length: 48:50
- Label: Matador
- Producer: Cat Power

Cat Power chronology
Dark End of the Street (2008)	Sun (2012)	Wanderer (2018)

Singles from Sun
- 1. "Ruin" Released: 2012; 2. "Cherokee" Released: 2012

Alternative cover
- Limited edition deluxe vinyl cover

Sun is the ninth studio album by American musician Cat Power. Her first album of all-original material since 2006's The Greatest, it was released on September 3, 2012, in the United Kingdom and in the United States on September 4, 2012, via Matador Records. The album was issued in a variety of formats, including a limited edition deluxe LP containing a 7-inch vinyl of bonus tracks.

The album's lead single, "Ruin", was released for free download at Matador Record's store on June 20, 2012. A music video for album opener "Cherokee", directed by Marshall, was later released, while an ambient remix of the song by Nicolas Jaar was available to download from Cat Power's official website. The song was premièred on NPR's All Songs Considered on June 26, whose host Bob Boilen described the album as "[going in] yet another direction. A lot more drive, a lot more electronics, drum machines, synths—it's very bold."

On April 10, 2013, Cat Power performed the previously unreleased track "Bully" on the premiere episode of the 42nd series of Later... with Jools Holland. Immediately following the broadcast, a new version of the album containing "Bully" as a bonus track was made available for download through iTunes.

== Background and recording ==
Work on the album initially began soon after the release of The Greatest, with Marshall announcing the album's title as far back as 2006 in an interview with The New York Times, where she also claimed that the entire album had already been written. Marshall decided to finance the recording of Sun herself, following financial difficulties arising from the cancellation of a lengthy tour in 2006 due to her hospitalisation. She was later declared bankrupt, claiming "I had my house in foreclosure and I hadn't paid taxes in two years. So to get away from people second guessing me and wondering what I was going to do with the advance for this album, I said, 'I'm going to fucking pay for this shit myself.' I knew that'd be the only way I could control things. So I cashed out my retirement fund." Recording began sometime in 2007, with Marshall building a studio in her Malibu home to record and produce new songs herself. However, much of the material recorded up to this point was later abandoned when Marshall decided it was "too painful and personal to put out", stating "I was writing all these really slow guitar songs, and my friend said, 'This is like depressing old Cat Power,' which made me feel like I got shot. I didn't work for eight months after that."

Progress on the album was delayed again with the recording and release of her second covers album Jukebox in 2008, and later by her relationship with Giovanni Ribisi. Following the tour in support of Jukebox, Marshall resumed recording at The Boat Studio in Silverlake, California, where she began work on newly written, electronic material, with Marshall claiming, "I had no fucking idea what to do, but I knew I was not going to even look at a piano or touch a guitar. So I started out with a weird synthesizer. Eventually I had these skeletons of songs, but then I felt like a failure because I thought, 'This is not fucking good, I don't know what I'm doing.' And I didn't know what I was doing. I had lyrics and a beat and notes, but I didn't have anything else. It sounded like a naked, shivering alien." This period of inactivity placed a strain on Marshall's relationship with her label Matador who, concerned by the lack of progress, began pressuring Marshall to work with a producer. Marshall—who hadn't worked with a producer since Ed Douglas recorded both Dear Sir and Myra Lee on the same day in December 1994—resisted, stating "Telling [a musician] they need a producer is like telling someone that they need a nose job. It activates something in you that makes you feel like a loser."

It was around this time that Marshall regrouped at her home in Malibu with members of her backing band, the Dirty Delta Blues, to start preparation for a tour in the beginning of 2011. Rehearsing many of the "skeletal" new compositions she had written, the band would go on to perform ten previously unreleased songs over the course of the tour; including "Cherokee", "Ruin", "Real Life" and "Human Being", as well as another six that would later be excluded from the album—"Bully", "Brave Liar", "Horizon", "Let Me Go", "Monster" and "Woman of My Word". Hoping to rerecord these songs with the band following completion of the tour, these sessions, according to Marshall, "didn't work out the way [she] hoped", noting that "Ruin" is the only song on the album to feature contributions from the Dirty Delta Blues band.

Production for the album continued at South Beach Studios in Miami, where Marshall began rerecording the instrumentation from the aborted Dirty Blues Band sessions. After hearing a song from the Beastie Boys album Hot Sauce Committee Part Two on the radio, she contacted that album's mixer, Cassius member Philippe Zdar, in the hope of a potential collaboration. Unable to pay Zdar for his mixing work until the album was finalised and presented to Matador for release, she transferred her work to Zdar's recording studio in France—where he worked pro bono—until sessions for the album finally concluded in April 2012.

== Critical reception ==
Professional ratings
Aggregate scores
Source	Rating
AnyDecentMusic?	7.5/10
Metacritic	78/100
Review scores
Source	Rating
AllMusic	4/5 stars
The A.V. Club	B
Entertainment Weekly	A−
The Guardian	4/5 stars
The Independent	3/5 stars
Los Angeles Times	3.5/4 stars
NME	7/10
Pitchfork	7.9/10
Rolling Stone	4/5 stars
Spin	8/10

Sun received generally positive reviews from music critics. At Metacritic, which assigns a normalized rating out of 100 to reviews from mainstream publications, the album received an average score of 78, based on 44 reviews, which indicates "generally favorable reviews". AllMusic editor Heather Phares, in a very positive review, commented that the album's "remarkably spare production aesthetic sounds all the more striking coming after The Greatest's lushness" and said that Marshall's "willingness and ability to mix, bend, and blend old and new sounds isn't such a far cry from the more sonically adventurous moments on Moon Pix and especially You Are Free; she's just expanding on that instinct and adding a more hopeful songwriting bent." Magnet commented that "this is easily her fullest-sounding, most animated record to date". Similarly, Drowned in Sound reviewer Hayley Avron referred to Sun as "the most rounded and accomplished [album] of Cat Power's career", elaborating that "it seemed that she may have reached a creative peak with The Greatest, which signified a definitive leap in her musical evolution. That wheel kept on turning though, and Sun marks an even bolder step forward; the songs sound light and layered with space and sound and is rich with an air of experimentation, with none of the pitfalls of amateurism that often accompany such forays into musical exploration." Rolling Stone's Rob Sheffield said that "Marshall has always been one of the most emotionally intense songwriters around, but with Sun she has made her riskiest, most vital album, not to mention one of her greatest." Melissa Maerz of Entertainment Weekly stated that Marshall has "never sounded more confident or in control than she does on Sun." Sarah Grant of Consequence of Sound called Sun a "passionate pop album of electronic music filtered through a singer-songwriter's soul", while The Fly reviewer Sophie Thomsett said that the album has "transformation and catharsis seeping through every note", before summarising that "at its peak, Sun reaches greatness, specifically with both "Manhattan" and the 11-minute opus 'Nothin' But Time', which count easily amongst some of the best material she's ever penned", with both writers awarding the album 4.5 out of 5 stars. Stephen Deusner of Paste said that the album was "absolutely fascinating in its humanity and compassion", awarding the album 8.0 out of 10. Matthew Foster of The Quietus, in a positive review, said that Sun "is about as cathartic as pop gets" and described the album as "the light at the end of one hell of a tunnel, a record brimming with an assurance and playfulness."

Anna Wilson of Clash said the album was "a robust, respectable detour, but will leave some fans pining for the smoky chanteuse of old." Andy Gill of The Independent commented on Marshall's change in musical direction, saying that she "abandoned her soul charm for something much less appealing," while claiming that the overdubbing process "turns tracks like 'Nothin' But Time' into trudges." awarding the album 3 stars out of 5. Under the Radar writer Austin Trunick said that the album "isn't likely to land among the singer-songwriter's best records, but it's clear, however, that her heart went into it", rating the album 3 out of 5.

=== Accolades ===
The album was included in several year-end lists by music critics and publications. Rolling Stone magazine, in their list of the "50 Best Albums of 2012", ranked it at 16th place, writing "the idea of the brilliantly morose Chan Marshall making a dance-rock record is almost absurd. Yet the groove-powered Sun is a perfect fit." The A.V. Club placed the album at number 22 on their list of the "Best Albums of 2012." Billboard also placed the album at number nine in their list of the "10 Best Albums of 2012". The Los Angeles Times and Filter magazine both placed the album at number six in their lists of the best albums of 2012. Sun was also included on two separate "Best Music of 2012" lists compiled by NPR, appearing at number five on the list compiled by Bob Boilen, while topping the list compiled by Robin Hilton. The album was also listed twenty-eighth on Stereogum's list of top 50 albums of 2012.

== Commercial performance ==
Sun entered the Billboard 200 at number 10 with sales of over 23,000 copies, making it Marshall's first top-10 album in the United States. The record also debuted at number two on Billboard's Alternative Albums and Independent Albums charts, and sold 54,000 copies in the US within three months of release, according to Nielsen SoundScan. In September 2018, The New York Times reported sales of over 114,000 in the US alone. In Europe, it sold over 40,000 copies.

== Track listing ==
All tracks are written by Chan Marshall.

No.	Title	Length
1.	"Cherokee"	4:45
2.	"Sun"	3:19
3.	"Ruin"	4:33
4.	"3,6,9"	4:00
5.	"Always on My Own"	2:23
6.	"Real Life"	2:37
7.	"Human Being"	3:28
8.	"Manhattan"	5:16
9.	"Silent Machine"	4:00
10.	"Nothin' But Time" (featuring Iggy Pop)	10:55
11.	"Peace and Love"	3:37
Total length:		48:50

iTunes Store deluxe edition bonus tracks
No.	Title	Length
12.	"Fire"	4:12
13.	"Back in the Days (For Christopher Wallace)" (pre-order only)	3:55
Total length:		56:07

Amazon MP3 exclusive version bonus track
No.	Title	Length
12.	"King Rides By" (2011 Version)	7:09
Total length:		55:59

Deluxe LP 7-inch vinyl
No.	Title	Length
1.	"Fire"	4:12
2.	"Back in the Days (For Christopher Wallace)"	3:55

Japanese edition bonus tracks
No.	Title	Length
12.	"Fire"	4:12
13.	"Back in the Days (For Christopher Wallace)" (Instrumental)	3:55
14.	"King Rides By" (2011 Version)	7:09
Total length:		63:16

2013 digital bonus tracks
No.	Title	Length
12.	"Fire"	4:12
13.	"Bully"	5:58
Total length:		58:10

== Personnel ==
Credits adapted from AllMusic and the liner notes of Sun.

Musicians

- Chan Marshall – vocals, production, all instrumentation except:
  - Judah Bauer – guitar on "Ruin", additional guitar on "Cherokee"
  - Gregg Foreman – piano on "Ruin"
  - Erik Paparazzi – bass on "Cherokee" and "Ruin"
  - Iggy Pop – vocals on "Nothin' But Time"
  - Jim White – drums on "Ruin"

Technical personnel

- Jordan Boulay – assistant engineer (South Beach Studios)
- Joe Brady – assistant engineer
- Phillip Broussard, Jnr. – engineer (The Boat Studio)
- Nick Brown – assistant engineer
- Rick Bryant – engineer (South Beach Studios)
- Jeff Dominguez – arranger, engineer (Motorbass Studio)
- Alex Graupera – assistant engineer (Motorbass Studio)
- Matt Knoble – engineer
- Mike Laza – engineer (The Boat Studio)
- Brian LeBarton – engineer (Malibu)
- Marc Lee – engineer, beat samples (South Beach Studios)
- Drew Manne – engineer (The Boat Studio)
- Julien Naudin – assistant engineer (Motorbass Studio)
- Alyssa Pittaluga – assistant engineer (The Boat Studio)
- Jon Tehel – assistant engineer (The Boat Studio)
- Bastien Vandevelde – assistant engineer (Motorbass Studio)
- Chris Warren – assistant engineer
- Philippe Zdar – mixing

== Charts ==
Chart (2012)	Peak position
Australian Albums (ARIA)	26
Austrian Albums (Ö3 Austria)	21
Belgian Albums (Ultratop Flanders)	5
Belgian Albums (Ultratop Wallonia)	20
Canadian Albums (Billboard)	12
Danish Albums (Hitlisten)	9
Dutch Albums (Album Top 100)	49
Finnish Albums (Suomen virallinen lista)	34
French Albums (SNEP)	7
German Albums (Offizielle Top 100)	19
Irish Albums (IRMA)	46
Irish Independent Albums (IRMA)	10
Italian Albums (FIMI)	29
Japanese Albums (Oricon)	194
New Zealand Albums (RMNZ)	23
Norwegian Albums (VG-lista)	18
Portuguese Albums (AFP)	11
Scottish Albums (Official Charts)	33
Spanish Albums (Promusicae)	18
Swedish Albums (Sverigetopplistan)	15
Swiss Albums (Schweizer Hitparade)	9
UK Albums (Official Charts)	33
UK Independent Albums (Official Charts)	3
US Billboard 200	10
US Independent Albums (Billboard)	2
US Top Alternative Albums (Billboard)	2
US Top Rock Albums (Billboard)	3

== Release history ==
Region	Date	Format	Label	Catalog	Ref.
Japan	August 29, 2012	CD; LP; digital download	Hostess	BGJ-10155	
Australia	August 31, 2012	CD; LP; digital download	Inertia	OLE-773-2	
Germany	August 31, 2012	CD; LP; digital download	Matador	OLE-773-2	
Ireland	August 31, 2012	CD; LP; digital download	Matador	OLE-773-2	
France	September 3, 2012	CD; LP; digital download	Matador	OLE-773-2	
United Kingdom	September 3, 2012	CD; LP; digital download	Matador	OLE-773-2	
United States	September 4, 2012	CD; LP; digital download	Matador	OLE-773-2	
