= EMusic Session EP =

eMusic Session EP

EP by Cat Power
- Released: October 3, 2006
- Recorded: June 2006
- Genre: Folk rock, indie rock
- Length: 13:12
- Label: Matador Records

Cat Power chronology
Live Session EP (2006)	eMusic Session EP (2006)	Jukebox (2007)

Professional ratings
Review scores
Source	Rating
Entertainment Weekly	B+
Urb	(not rated)

eMusic Session EP is an album by American singer-songwriter Cat Power published in 2006 by Matador Records exclusively for the eMusic online music store. The recording is an edited portion of Power's appearance on KCRW's Morning Becomes Eclectic broadcast in June 2006. It includes two songs from Power's previous albums The Greatest and You Are Free as well as two previously unreleased cover songs.

== Track listing ==
eMusic Session EP track listing
No.	Title	Writer(s)	Length
1.	"The Greatest" (originally from The Greatest, 2006)	Chan Marshall	3:50
2.	"Remember Me" (cover of one of the last songs written by Otis Redding, originally released in his posthumous 1968 compilation, The Immortal Otis Redding.)	Otis Redding	3:51
3.	"Ramblin' Man" (originally performed by Hank Williams with His Drifting Cowboys as a B-side on the Take These Chains from My Heart single in 1953. Also covered by Marshall in her 2007 album, Jukebox, as "Ramblin' (Wo)man".)	Hank Williams	2:45
4.	"Good Woman" (originally from You Are Free, 2003)	Chan Marshall	3:52
Total length:			13:12
