= Covers (Cat Power album) =

Studio album by Cat Power
- Released: January 14, 2022
- Recorded: 2021
- Studio: Mant Sounds, New York
- Genre: Rock
- Length: 43:15
- Label: Domino
- Producer: Chan Marshall

Cat Power chronology
Wanderer (2018)	Covers (2022)	Cat Power Sings Dylan: The 1966 Royal Albert Hall Concert (2023)

Singles from Covers
- 1. "Bad Religion"/"A Pair of Brown Eyes" Released: October 7, 2021; 2. "I'll Be Seeing You"/"Unhate" Released: December 14, 2021

Covers is the eleventh studio album by the American musician Cat Power, the stage name of American singer-songwriter Chan Marshall. Her third collection of cover songs, following 2000's The Covers Record and 2008's Jukebox, the album was released worldwide on January 14, 2022, by Domino Recording Company.

== Recording and production ==
Covers is Marshall's third collection of cover songs, following 2000's The Covers Record and 2008's Jukebox. The album was recorded alongside Marshall's live band: guitarist Adeline Jasso, bassist and keyboardist Erik Paparozzi, and drummer Alianna Kalaba. Marshall was not planning on recording a covers album, and was originally intent on recording original compositions. She explained: "I got in the studio and I wanted the band to relax, so I started composing improvisationally, just getting them to play certain things that sounded good together. For the first four songs we recorded that day, I had no idea what the vocals would be or what the song would be. They were four songs that I had no intention of covering. I just wanted the band to warm up, and when I got them to play something that I liked the sound of, I went to the vocal booth and I said, 'Just don't stop.' Then I was like, 'What cover should I sing over this music that is playing?'.

"Unhate" is a new recording of "Hate", a song from Marshall's 2006 album The Greatest. A re-recording of one of Marshall's older songs has appeared on each of her cover albums. This has been inspired by the live performances of Bob Dylan, who frequently rearranges the majority of his own work when touring. Marshall explained: "The amount of live shows that I've played, I won't play a song for 20 years or something, and then I'll come back around and there'll be something in my life, present time, later in life, that will make me want to play something that I wrote before, but there's a whole 'nother set of life experiences why I want to play it again. That informs the music and the change of lyrics at times."

The melody to her cover of Frank Ocean's "Bad Religion" is similar to the melody of "In Your Face", a song from her previous album Wanderer. Marshall said that she "started feeling more and more angry inside" while performing the latter song live, a track she described as "basically a ballad to the white 1% male". She said: "Every time I sang that song live, it didn't matter if I was calm or relaxed or whatever. I kept getting more and more angry with the reality of what it made me think about, and so just one night switched the lyrics to 'Bad Religion' and I felt so much better." The cover of The Pogues' "A Pair of Brown Eyes" was recorded by Marshall alone using a Mellotron.

== Release and promotion ==
She performed "Bad Religion" on The Late Late Show with James Corden on October 6, 2021. The song was released on streaming platforms as a double A-side single with "A Pair of Brown Eyes" the following day. A music video for "Pa Pa Power" was directed by Gren Hunt and released on November 1. A music video for "I'll Be Seeing You" was released on December 14, the same day the song was released as a double A-side single with "Unhate". The album was supported by a US and European tour beginning in April 2022.

== Critical reception ==
Professional ratings
Aggregate scores
Source	Rating
AnyDecentMusic?	7.3/10
Metacritic	79/100
Review scores
Source	Rating
AllMusic	3.5/5 stars
Beats Per Minute	75%
Clash	8/10
The Guardian	3/5 stars
MusicOMH	3/5 stars
NME	4/5 stars
No Ripcord	7/1/0
Pitchfork	7.7/10
Record Collector	4/5 stars
Under the Radar	7/10 stars

Covers received generally positive reviews from music critics. At Metacritic, which assigns a normalized rating out of 100 to reviews from mainstream critics, the album has an average score of 79 based on 16 reviews, indicating "generally favorable reviews". Aggregator AnyDecentMusic? gave the album 7.3 out of 10, based on their assessment of the critical consensus. It appeared at number thirteen on Les Inrockuptibles list of the 100 best albums of 2022.

== Track listing ==
Covers track listing
No.	Title	Writer(s)	Original artist(s)	Length
1.	"Bad Religion"	Christopher Breaux; Monte Neuble; Charlie Gambetta; Kevin Risto; Waynne Nugent; Chan Marshall	Frank Ocean	4:20
2.	"Unhate"	Marshall	Cat Power	2:44
3.	"Pa Pa Power"	Ryan Gosling; Zach Sheilds	Dead Man's Bones	3:10
4.	"White Mustang"	Lana Del Rey; Rick Nowels	Lana Del Rey	3:00
5.	"A Pair of Brown Eyes"	Shane MacGowan	The Pogues	3:42
6.	"Against the Wind"	Bob Seger	Bob Seger	3:13
7.	"Endless Sea"	Iggy Pop	Iggy Pop	3:35
8.	"These Days"	Jackson Browne	Nico	3:44
9.	"It Wasn't God Who Made Honky Tonk Angels"	J. D. "Jay" Miller	Kitty Wells	2:33
10.	"I Had a Dream, Joe"	Nick Cave	Nick Cave and the Bad Seeds	4:39
11.	"Here Comes a Regular"	Paul Westerberg	The Replacements	5:14
12.	"I'll Be Seeing You"	Sammy Fain; Irving Kahal	Billie Holiday	3:22
Total length:				43:15

Covers – Japanese bonus track
No.	Title	Writer(s)	Original artist(s)	Length
13.	"You Got the Silver"	Jagger/Richards	The Rolling Stones	3:00
Total length:				46:27

Covers – Domino Mart-exclusive bonus 7" vinyl
No.	Title	Writer(s)	Length
1.	"You Got the Silver" (Stereo)	Jagger/Richards
2.	"You Got the Silver" (Mono)	Jagger/Richards

== Credits and personnel ==
- Chan Marshall – vocals, instrumentation, production
- Mark Chalecki – mastering
- Adeline Jasso – guitar
- Alianna Kalaba – drums
- Erik Paparazzi – keyboards, bass, guitar
- Matt Pynn – pedal steel guitar
- Matt Schuessler – assistant engineer
- Rob Schnapf – engineering, mixing
- Mario Sorrenti – photography

== Charts ==
Chart performance for Covers
Chart (2022)	Peak position
Austrian Albums (Ö3 Austria)	23
Belgian Albums (Ultratop Flanders)	24
Belgian Albums (Ultratop Wallonia)	38
French Albums (SNEP)	35
German Albums (Offizielle Top 100)	17
Portuguese Albums (AFP)	15
Scottish Albums (OCC)	16
Spanish Albums (PROMUSICAE)	71
Swiss Albums (Schweizer Hitparade)	12
UK Independent Albums (OCC)	5
