= Speaking for Trees =

Live album by Cat Power
- Released: October 26, 2004
- Genre: Indie rock

Professional ratings
Review scores
Source	Rating
Pitchfork Media	6.1/10 link

Speaking for Trees: A Film by Mark Borthwick is a DVD/CD package by the American singer-songwriter Cat Power (a.k.a. Chan Marshall), released on October 26, 2004.

== Content ==
The DVD features footage of Cat Power singing and playing electric guitar in a forest at West Kill Mountain, New York, filmed by British photographer Mark Borthwick in mostly static shots lasting for approximately one hour and 40 minutes. Marshall does not sing into a microphone, but her guitar is plugged into an offscreen guitar amp.

The DVD also contains three short films by Borthwick, set to the songs "Maybe Not", "Free" and "Half of You," from Cat Power's 2003 album, You Are Free.

The CD contains the single song "Willie Deadwilder," an 18-minute outtake from the You Are Free sessions featuring American singer-songwriter M. Ward on guitar. The song was reworked as "Willie", a six-minute track on Cat Power's 2006 album, The Greatest.

== Reception ==
Stephen M. Deusner of Pitchfork described the film as "too dull...to be of much use to any but the most obsessive fans" and wrote that despite Marshall's "haunting voice and more-than-capable guitar playing," the film's true focus seemed to be "Borthwick's ingenious concept" itself. However, he praised "Willie Deadwilder" as "not just listenable but deeply intriguing," comparing it to the 1995 Sonic Youth song "The Diamond Sea" in that "every aspect of the track-- its lyrics, length, sense of performance-- conveys this idea: 'This is...our song/ And it will go on and on/ A moment in time traveling on/ Even if it is too long, I don't care.'"

== Track listing ==
=== DVD ===
All tracks by Chan Marshall except where noted.

1. "Time Is on My Side" (Jerry Ragovoy as Norman Meade)
2. "Night Time/ Back of Your Head" (Alex Chilton/ Marshall)
3. "Rule the Islands"
4. "You"
5. "Knockin' on Heaven's Door" (Bob Dylan)
6. "From Fur City"
7. "I Want"
8. "Dream/ Blue Moon/ Try a Little Tenderness" James Campbell/ Reginald Connelly/ Lorenz Hart/ Marshall/ Richard Rodgers/ Harry M. Woods
9. "You"
10. "From Fur City"
11. "Knockin' on Heaven's Door" (Dylan)
12. "Farewell My Enemy"
13. "Sad, Sad, Song" (M. Ward))
14. "Rule the Islands"
15. "Evolution"
16. "Night Time/ Back of Your Head" (Alex Chilton/ Marshall)
17. "Sophisticated Lady" (Duke Ellington/ Irving Mills/ Mitchell Parish)
18. "I Don't Blame You"
19. "Dream/ Blue Moon/ Try a Little Tenderness" (James Campbell/ Reginald Connelly/ Lorenz Hart/ Marshall/ Richard Rodgers/ Harry M. Woods)
20. "The Party"
21. "Funny Things"
22. "Love and Communication"
23. "From Fur City"
24. "Sad, Sad, Song" (M. Ward)
25. "Night Time/ Back of Your Head" (Chilton/ Marshall)
26. "Sophisticated Lady" (Ellington/ Mills/ Parish)
27. "I Want"
28. "Knockin' on Heaven's Door" (Dylan)
29. "Lord, Help the Poor and Needy" (Traditional)

Recorded and produced by Trevor Kampmann.

=== CD ===
1. "Willie Deadwilder"
