= The Dark End of the Street (disambiguation) =

"The Dark End of the Street" is a 1967 soul song written by songwriters Dan Penn and Chips Moman.

The Dark End of the Street may refer to:

- Dark End of the Street (Moving Hearts album), a 1982 album by Irish folk rock band Moving Hearts
- Dark End of the Street (EP), a 2008 EP album by American singer/songwriter Chan Marshall, also known as Cat Power
- The Dark End of the Street (1981 film), an American drama film
- The Dark End of the Street (2020 film), an American drama film
