= Wanderer (Cat Power album) =

Studio album by Cat Power
- Released: October 5, 2018
- Studio: The Pink House, Miami; 10K Islands, Miami; Mant, Los Angeles
- Genre: Country blues
- Length: 37:55
- Label: Domino
- Producer: Cat Power

Cat Power chronology
Sun (2012)	Wanderer (2018)	Covers (2022)

Singles from Wanderer
- 1. "Wanderer" Released: July 18, 2018; 2. "Woman" Released: August 15, 2018; 3. "Stay" Released: September 18, 2018

Wanderer is the tenth studio album by Cat Power, the stage name and eponymous band of the American singer-songwriter Chan Marshall. It was released on October 5, 2018, by Domino.

== Background and recording ==
The album is the first Cat Power release since 1996's Myra Lee not to be issued under Matador Records. According to Power – real name Chan Marshall – executives at Matador outright rejected the completed album, and told her to "Do it again. Do it over." Following this incident, Marshall hired Andy Slater, her first manager, who confirmed that Matador told him Wanderer was "not good enough, not strong enough to put out." Marshall said she received similar criticism from the label during the recording of her 2012 album Sun: "It was like, 'We need hits!' And I did it—[Sun reached the] Top 10 [of the Billboard 200.] I did the best I could to give them 'hits' [on Sun]."

Marshall also said that, while she was recording Wanderer, an executive from Matador came to the studio specifically to ask her to listen to Adele's 25, telling her that "this is how a record is supposed to sound". She explained: "Looking back, I know they [Matador] were using me. I understand [now] that I was a product, but I always thought I was a person." She credited her manager for telling her "that I have a lot to be proud of. It's not pretentious to be called an 'artist'. It's not corny to sing songs that maybe other people think are 'depressing'. It's not embarrassing." The only song recorded for the album after Marshall's split with Matador is "Woman", a duet with Lana Del Rey (whom Marshall opened for on the European leg of her LA to the Moon Tour), which has been described by The New York Times as "a middle finger to her ex-label".

Wanderer was produced entirely by Marshall herself and was written and recorded in Miami's the Pink House and 10K Islands and Los Angeles' Mant Studio over the past few years. Marshall stated: "The course my life has taken in this journey—going from town to town, with my guitar, telling my tale; with reverence to the people who did this generations before me. Folk singers, blues singers, and everything in between. They were all wanderers, and I am lucky to be among them." It was engineered and mixed by Rob Schnapf, who said Marshall "did not want to make a 'big' record—absolutely not … [Sometimes] her eyes would roll back and she'd just channel and go [into the recording booth]. You can't make that happen. Either you've got the genie in the bottle, or you've just got the bottle."

The record includes a cover version of Rihanna's "Stay", which Marshall explained had "stuck with me ever since I'd heard it in an old boyfriend's car. He was picking me up and he opened the door and that song was on the radio. He said, 'Oh, there's my girl,' and I thought he was talking about me, you know? Then the song ended and he turned off the radio, and I realized he was talking about Rihanna."

== Release and promotion ==
Marshall announced Wanderer on July 18, 2018, alongside a music video of the title track, which set as an introduction to the record. The second single, "Woman" featuring Lana Del Rey, was released on August 15, and the third single, a cover of Rihanna's "Stay", was released on September 18. The album was released on CD, LP, digital download and streaming services on October 5, 2018, through Domino Recording Company. It is her first album to not be released on Matador Records since 1996.

In promotion of the album, Marshall embarked on a world tour which began in September at Riot Fest. On October 4, she performed the single "Woman" on The Late Show with Stephen Colbert.

== Critical reception ==
Professional ratings
Aggregate scores
Source	Rating
AnyDecentMusic?	7.4/10
Metacritic	79/100
Review scores
Source	Rating
AllMusic	4.5/5 stars
The A.V. Club	C+
The Daily Telegraph	3/5 stars
The Guardian	4/5 stars
The Independent	4/5 stars
NME	4/5 stars
Pitchfork	7.4/10
Q	4/5 stars
Rolling Stone	4/5 stars
Uncut	8/10

Wanderer received positive reviews upon release. At Metacritic, which assigns a normalized rating out of 100 to reviews from mainstream critics, it received an average score of 79 out of 100, based on 27 publications, which indicates "generally favorable reviews". The record also received an average rating of 7.4 out of 10 at AnyDecentMusic?. In his review for Rolling Stone, critic Will Hermes wrote, "Cat Power, lays full claim to the title of her tenth album, Wanderer with the authority of a blueswoman who's seen some shit, alternately conjuring trances and slapping you out of them, projecting clear-eyed, uncompromising strength on one of the most fragile-sounding sets she's ever made." Katie Moulton from Consequence of Sound opined that "Wanderer is neither as harrowing as Moon Pix nor as kaleidoscopic as Sun, but it shows a mature artist who rides the waves of tumultuous experience—no less excellent for containing her multitudes." Jordan Bassett of NME stated that "this album is a quiet triumph, the understated work of an artist honouring herself and her creativity."

Alexis Petridis of The Guardian said, "These are complex songs, striking but low-key: their constant references to motion and travel seem to have as much to do with Marshall's determination to go her own way artistically – whatever expectations others have of her – as they do with the peripatetic life of a touring musician. There's a quiet confidence and poise about Wanderer that suggests Marshall is exactly where she wants to be." AllMusic writer Heather Phares wrote, "As tender as it is uncompromising, Wanderer is exactly the album Marshall needed to make at this point in her career and life. It's some of her most essential music, in both senses of the word." The Independent's Elisa Bray said, "Understated, beautifully crafted and always emotionally involving, Wanderer shows an artist who has found strength in her convictions, and a new pace of life." Hal Horowitz of American Songwriter called the album "an intimate, multifaceted reflection of her always complex, frequently indistinct character. These often inscrutable songs offer kaleidoscopic glimpses into what seems like a complicated persona."

Jayson Greene of Pitchfork said "Wanderer drags just the tiniest bit. It speaks softly from the echoes of the best Cat Power moments, which means it doesn't ice-pick you in the center of your most treasured insecurities the way some of her most celebrated music has." The Telegraph's Neil McCormick wrote, "Wanderer is an album of peculiar little songs that you won't hear in anyone else's catalogue. It is ungainly, odd, and at times almost amateurish. For some, Cat Power will always sound slightly unfinished. For others, it is exactly that quality that makes her records ring with raw truth." In a more mixed review, The A.V. Club critic Annie Zaleski stated that "there's nothing inherently wrong about Wanderer being mannered—but, unfortunately, the album's subtlety is also often its undoing."

== Track listing ==
All tracks are written by Chan Marshall, except track 6 by Mikky Ekko and Justin Parker.

No.	Title	Length
1.	"Wanderer"	1:14
2.	"In Your Face"	4:10
3.	"You Get"	3:43
4.	"Woman" (featuring Lana Del Rey)	4:50
5.	"Horizon"	4:24
6.	"Stay"	3:58
7.	"Black"	3:56
8.	"Robbin Hood"	2:10
9.	"Nothing Really Matters"	3:12
10.	"Me voy"	4:00
11.	"Wanderer / Exit"	2:18
Total length:		37:55

Wanderer – UK HMV-exclusive bonus track
No.	Title	Writer(s)	Length
12.	"What the World Needs Now"	Hal David; Burt Bacharach	2:29

Wanderer – Limited edition 7" vinyl
No.	Title	Writer(s)	Length
12.	"Woman" (single version)		4:05
13.	"What the World Needs Now"	David; Bacharach	2:29

== Credits and personnel ==
Credits adapted from the liner notes of Wanderer.

Musicians

- Chan Marshall – all vocals, instrumentation and production, except:
- Lana Del Rey – vocals (track 4)
- Nico Segal – trumpet (track 11)
- Patrick Warren – string arrangements, violin and cello

Technical

- Jef Dominguez – engineering
- Ted Jensen – mastering
- Brian Lebarton – additional engineering
- Pablo Mekler – photography
- Brian Rosemeyer – additional engineering
- Rob Schnapf – engineering and mixing

== Charts ==
Chart (2018)	Peak position
Australian Albums (ARIA)	42
Austrian Albums (Ö3 Austria)	21
Belgian Albums (Ultratop Flanders)	24
Belgian Albums (Ultratop Wallonia)	31
Dutch Albums (Album Top 100)	90
French Albums (SNEP)	19
German Albums (Offizielle Top 100)	18
Irish Albums (IRMA)	71
Italian Albums (FIMI)	93
Portuguese Albums (AFP)	10
Scottish Albums (OCC)	18
Spanish Albums (PROMUSICAE)	24
Swedish Albums (Sverigetopplistan)	45
Swiss Albums (Schweizer Hitparade)	11
UK Albums (OCC)	29
US Billboard 200	96
US Top Alternative Albums (Billboard)	10
US Independent Albums (Billboard)	4
US Top Rock Albums (Billboard)	18
