= V for Vendetta: Music from the Motion Picture =

V for Vendetta: Music From The Motion Picture

Soundtrack album by Various Artists
- Released: March 21, 2006
- Genre: Soundtrack
- Length: 63:00
- Label: Astralwerks

Professional ratings
Review scores
Source	Rating
AllMusic	3.5/5 stars
ScoreNotes	8.5/10 stars

V for Vendetta: Music from the Motion Picture is the soundtrack from the 2006 film V for Vendetta, released by Astralwerks Records on March 21, 2006. Most of the music was written by Dario Marianelli. Other artists include Julie London, Cat Power and Antony and the Johnsons.

== Music ==
The track "Remember, Remember" uses the "national anthem" part of the 1812 Overture by Tchaikovsky, and "Knives And Bullets (And Cannons Too)" incorporates the piece in its final two minutes.

The second track in the ending credits is "BKAB" by independent producer Ethan Stoller. It features excerpts of speeches by Malcolm X and Gloria Steinem, and Martin Luther King Jr. It also samples two Bollywood songs, "Pardesi Pardesi" composed by music director duo Nadeem-Shravan and "Chura ke dil meraaa .. goriya chali" composed by music director Anu Malik.

Several songs used in the film were omitted from the soundtrack. These included the first track to be played in the background of the movie's ending credits, "Street Fighting Man" by The Rolling Stones, Beethoven's 5th Symphony, and "Long Black Train" by Richard Hawley. "Yakety Sax" by Boots Randolph and James Rich are also omitted. Also the beginning of the eggie in a basket scene the jukebox played "The Girl From Ipanema."

== Track listing ==
All tracks are written by Dario Marianelli, except where noted.

No.	Title	Length
1.	"Remember Remember"	6:42
2.	"Cry Me a River" (Written by Arthur Hamilton. Performed by Julie London.)	2:48
3.	"...Governments Should Be Afraid of Their People..."	3:11
4.	"Evey's Story"	2:48
5.	"Lust at the Abbey"	3:17
6.	"The Red Diary"	7:33
7.	"Valerie"	8:48
8.	"Evey Reborn"	3:50
9.	"I Found a Reason" (Written by Lou Reed. Performed by Cat Power.)	2:02
10.	"England Prevails"	5:45
11.	"The Dominoes Fall"	5:28
12.	"Bird Gerhl" (Written by Antony Hegarty. Performed by Antony and the Johnsons.)	3:17
13.	"Knives and Bullets (And Cannons Too)" (Written by Dario Marianelli and Pyotr Ilyich Tchaikovsky.)	7:33
Total length:		63:00

== Use in popular media ==
The track "Evey Reborn" is used in the trailer for the 2010 film Buried and the second trailer for the 2014 film Interstellar.
