= Maria Cornejo =

Chilean-American fashion designer (born 1962)

- Cornejo in 2014 at Cooper Hewitt
- Born: 1962 (age 63–64); Chile
- Education: Ravensbourne College
- Occupation: Fashion designer
- Label: Zero + Maria Cornejo
- Spouse: Mark Borthwick (m. 1988; div. 2021)
- Children: 2
- Awards: Cooper Hewitt National Design Award (2006); Fashion Group International Sustainability Award (2018); CFDA Geoffrey Beene Lifetime Achievement Award (2023)

Maria Cornejo (born 1962) is a Chilean-born American fashion designer based in New York and known for her Zero + Maria Cornejo collection. She has been awarded Cooper Hewitt National Design Award and CFDA's Lifetime Achievement Award.

== Life and career ==
Cornejo was born in Chile in 1962. After the 1973 Chilean coup d'état, her parents, who had worked at a publishing company, lost their jobs. After staying in Peru for a year and London for six months, at the age of 12, she and her family relocated to Manchester, England during Pinochet's dictatorship. In 1977, her mother died. In 1984, she graduated from Ravensbourne College in London, and with John Richmond, created the Richmond/Cornejo label. She then moved to Paris and married Mark Borthwick in 1988.

In 1996, Cornejo and her family moved to New York City. Two years later, in 1998, she opened a store called Zero which she converted from a garage space on Mott Street; the store was later renamed Zero + Maria Cornejo.

== Clients ==
Cornejo's clients include Michelle Obama, Tilda Swinton, Christy Turlington and Cindy Sherman.

== Honors ==
Cornejo was the Fashion Prize winner of the 2006 Smithsonian Cooper Hewitt National Design Awards after being selected as a finalist in 2005. Cornejo has been a member of the Council of Fashion Designers of America (CFDA) since 2003 and an original member of the CFDA Sustainability Committee. In 2010, Cornejo won the first CFDA Lexus Eco Fashion Challenge and in 2017 was awarded one of the top three prizes in the CFDA + Lexus Fashion* Initiative, a 17-month long business development program aimed at accomplishing measurable sustainability changes within the business. In 2018, Cornejo was honored with the Fashion Group International’s Sustainability Award at their Night of the Stars Gala in New York City. In 2019, Cornejo was appointed to the CFDA board of directors by the new chairman, Tom Ford. In 2023, she received the Geoffrey Beene Lifetime Achievement Award from the CFDA.

Cornejo is a naturalized American citizen and a 2019 honoree of Carnegie Foundation's Great Immigrants, Great Americans Award.
