= Woman (Cat Power song) =

2018 song by Børns

Single by Cat Power featuring Lana Del Rey

from the album Wanderer
- Released: August 15, 2018
- Recorded: 2016–2018
- Studio: 10K Islands (Los Angeles, CA); The Pink House Recording Studio (Portland, OR)
- Length: 4:50
- Label: Domino Recording Company
- Songwriter: Chan Marshall
- Producer: Cat Power

Cat Power singles chronology
"Action" (2016)	"Woman" (2018)

Lana Del Rey singles chronology
"You Must Love Me" (2017)	"Woman" (2018)	"Mariners Apartment Complex" (2018)

Music video
- "Woman" on YouTube

"Woman" is a song by American musician Cat Power, featuring guest vocals from singer-songwriter Lana Del Rey. The track was released on August 15, 2018 as a single from Power's 2018 album, Wanderer (2018).

== Background ==
In an interview with The Current, Cat Power said: "[Woman] was the first song I started recording and it was the last song I finished and it was never included on the album for my ex-label when I delivered the album to them — and they rejected it, so there was a year of time where I needed to find what I was going to do with my life... During that time, Lana Del Rey reached out to me personally... Right before I was supposed to master the record, Lana asked me to go on tour with her, so I waited on the mastering. When I got home from that tour I realized I should ask Domino Records if they would allow me to attach this song called 'Woman,' because of exactly what's going on. Don't you feel a lot better standing in the street with your protest sign with someone else standing there next to you than standing there by yourself? Then it's just a sad Cat Power song about my perspective. So that's why I asked Lana. When we're together things look better. They're different, they can push a feeling harder. It sort of creates an abstract illusion of multi-dimensionalism, which we are. We are all over the world and we are brave and strong and kind and resilient and compassionate, multi-dimensional! We're just coming to get this communion together."

== Critical reception ==
Sasha Geffen of Pitchfork praised the song, claiming it "positions these two singers as a natural pair" and praised the fierce lyrics. The New York Times described the song as "a middle finger to her ex-label". Gil Kaufamn of Billboard called the song "a classic Cat Power mid-tempo sizzler, opening with a gentle acoustic guitar strum and funky keyboard vamp under the lines."

== Promotion and release ==
Cat Power promoted the song through various outlets, including a solo appearance on The Late Show with Stephen Colbert. She then embarked on a promotional tour for the album, which featured the song in its set list.

== Music video ==
An official video for the song was released on YouTube on August 15, 2018. The video was directed by Greg Hunt, and does not feature Del Rey. Jon Blistein of Rolling Stone described the video as "the simple clip captures Cat Power and her band performing the simmering track on a rooftop at sunset and in a studio where the light moves dramatically between blue and pink."

== Charts ==
Chart (2018)	Peak position
US Triple A Songs	20
