= Cat Power Sings Dylan: The 1966 Royal Albert Hall Concert =

Live album by Cat Power
- Released: November 10, 2023
- Recorded: November 5, 2022
- Venues: Royal Albert Hall, London
- Length: 88:34
- Label: Domino

Cat Power chronology
Covers (2022)	Cat Power Sings Dylan: The 1966 Royal Albert Hall Concert (2023)

Cat Power Sings Dylan: The 1966 Royal Albert Hall Concert is a live album by the American singer-songwriter Cat Power, released on November 10, 2023, through Domino Recording Company. It was recorded on November 5, 2022, at the Royal Albert Hall in London, with Cat Power recreating Bob Dylan's show at the Manchester Free Trade Hall in May 1966, which was bootlegged and mistakenly labeled as having been recorded at the Royal Albert Hall. It received positive reviews from critics.

== Content ==
The album is a faithful recreation of Dylan's set at the Manchester Free Trade Hall on May 17, 1966, down to the switch to electric instruments half-way through. The show includes an audience member shouting "Judas!" at Cat Power in the same manner that a person did to Dylan during his Manchester concert.

== Critical reception ==
Professional ratings
Aggregate scores
Source	Rating
Metacritic	78/100
Review scores
Source	Rating
American Songwriter	3.5/5 stars
Exclaim!	8/10
The Line of Best Fit	7/10
Mojo	4/5 stars
Pitchfork	7.3/10
Uncut	7/10

Cat Power Sings Dylan: The 1966 Royal Albert Hall Concert received a score of 78 out of 100 on review aggregator Metacritic based on nine critics' reviews, indicating "generally favorable" reception. Uncut stated that "for the acoustic half, she genuflects a little too readily, but the limberness of her voice shades new contours for the songs; the electric half takes a while to ignite, but 'Like a Rolling Stone' is gorgeous". Mojo wrote that "the crackle of original Dylan electrifies Marshall's voice, she finds her own phrasing, both robust and reverent, as she ringmasters 'Ballad of a Thin Man''s mystic forces, or brings a limpid empathy to 'Like a Rolling Stone'". Nicholas Sokic of Exclaim! felt that "Marshall's embodiment is largely faithful, even reverent, to Dylan's interpretations, except on the occasions that she injects a little subversion into the setlist", summarizing that it "showcases Marshall as devotee, student and messenger".

Writing for The Line of Best Fit, Janne Oinonen found there to be "no revisionist re-interpretations to irk even the biggest Dylan purist" as although Marshall's "steadfast adherence to the original 1966 arrangements can also seem like a missed opportunity to dust off the classics" due to her previous covers, "Marshall proves that her reputation as a masterful interpreter (solidified over a series of covers albums) is fully justified". American Songwriter's Hal Horowitz opined that "Marshall applies her stamp on material she loves, the live atmosphere enhances the enthusiasm, the audio is crisp and the show successfully accomplishes what it sets out to do". Andy Cush of Pitchfork wrote that "her band doesn't nearly approach the unhinged vehemence of Dylan's, which is a shame" and "rather than in volume and intensity, Sings Dylan finds subversion in its very form, as a covers album that celebrates and estranges its source material at once".

== Track listing ==
All tracks are written by Bob Dylan, except "Baby, Let Me Follow You Down", written by Reverend Gary Davis, Dave van Ronk and Eric von Schmidt.

Cat Power Sings Dylan: The 1966 Royal Albert Hall Concert track listing
No.	Title	Length
1.	"She Belongs to Me"	4:49
2.	"Fourth Time Around"	4:45
3.	"Visions of Johanna"	9:29
4.	"It's All Over Now, Baby Blue"	5:10
5.	"Desolation Row"	12:29
6.	"Just Like a Woman"	5:55
7.	"Mr. Tambourine Man"	6:29
8.	"Tell Me, Momma"	4:46
9.	"I Don't Believe You (She Acts Like We Never Have Met)"	5:33
10.	"Baby, Let Me Follow You Down"	2:47
11.	"Just Like Tom Thumb's Blues"	5:51
12.	"Leopard-Skin Pill-Box Hat"	3:42
13.	"One Too Many Mornings"	4:02
14.	"Ballad of a Thin Man"	6:11
15.	"Like a Rolling Stone"	6:36
Total length:		88:34

== Charts ==
Chart performance for Cat Power Sings Dylan: The 1966 Royal Albert Hall Concert
Chart (2023)	Peak position
Austrian Albums (Ö3 Austria)	14
Belgian Albums (Ultratop Flanders)	127
Belgian Albums (Ultratop Wallonia)	70
Dutch Albums (Album Top 100)	88
French Albums (SNEP)	37
German Albums (Offizielle Top 100)	22
Portuguese Albums (AFP)	14
Scottish Albums (Official Charts)	17
Swiss Albums (Schweizer Hitparade)	20
UK Album Downloads (Official Charts)	18
UK Independent Albums (Official Charts)	4

== See also ==
- The Bootleg Series Vol. 4: Bob Dylan Live 1966, The "Royal Albert Hall" Concert, a 1998 live album by Dylan of his May 1966 show
