= Dark End of the Street (EP) =

EP by Cat Power
- Released: December 9, 2008
- Genre: Indie rock
- Label: Matador
- Producer: Stuart Sikes

Cat Power chronology
Jukebox (2008)	Dark End of the Street (2008)	Sun (2012)

Professional ratings
Aggregate scores
Source	Rating
Metacritic	62/100
Review scores
Source	Rating
The A.V. Club	B
Drowned in Sound	5/10 stars
musicOMH	3/5 stars
NME	8/10 stars
Now	2/5 stars
Pitchfork Media	(3.8/10)
PopMatters	5/10 stars
Rolling Stone	4/5 stars
Spin	3/5 stars
Uncut	3/5 stars

Dark End of the Street is an EP album by American singer-songwriter Chan Marshall, also known as Cat Power. It was released on 9 December 2008 by Matador Records.

Dark End of the Street was released both digitally and on a limited edition double 10". It contains six songs originally by Brendan Behan, James Carr, Sandy Denny, Creedence Clearwater Revival, Otis Redding, and Aretha Franklin, which were recorded during Cat Power's Jukebox sessions. Among the six, four were previously unpublished tracks.

== Track listing ==
1. "Dark End of the Street" (Chips Moman, Dan Penn) *
2. "Fortunate Son" (John Fogerty)
3. "Ye Auld Triangle" (Dominic Behan) *
4. "I've Been Loving You Too Long (To Stop Now)" (Otis Redding, Jerry Butler)
5. "Who Knows Where the Time Goes?" (Sandy Denny) *
6. "It Ain't Fair" (Ronnie Miller) *

* previously unreleased

== Personnel ==
- Chan Marshall – vocals
- Judah Bauer, Teenie Hodges – guitar
- Erik Paparazzi – bass
- Gregg Foreman, Spooner Oldham – piano, organ
- Dylan Willemsa – viola
- Jim White – drums
- Larry McDonald – percussion
