= Dear Sir =

1995 studio album by Cat Power

Studio album by Cat Power
- Released: October 23, 1995; July 3, 2001 (reissue)
- Recorded: December 1994
- Studio: Mott Street studio space, New York City, U.S.
- Genre: Lo-fi; indie rock
- Length: 27:40; 31:53 (2001 reissue)
- Label: Runt; Plain Recordings (2001 reissue)
- Producer: Ed Douglas

Cat Power chronology
Dear Sir (1995)	Myra Lee (1996)

Dear Sir is the debut studio album by American singer-songwriter Chan Marshall, also known as Cat Power, released in October 1995 on Runt Records. Recorded in New York City in December 1994 during studio sessions with Tim Foljahn and Steve Shelley (which also produced the material on her second album, Myra Lee, released one year later), the album displays Marshall's sparse guitar playing and early lo-fi influence. The album had originally been conceived as an EP, and features covers of songs by Tom Waits and This Kind of Punishment.

The album was reissued by Plain Recordings in 2001 on CD and vinyl, with an alternate recording of the song "Great Expectations" as the eighth track.

== Recording and production ==
Marshall recorded Dear Sir in December 1994 in a small basement studio near Mott Street in New York City at the same time she recorded Myra Lee (1996), which was released nearly two years later, with guitarist Tim Foljahn and Sonic Youth drummer Steve Shelley; Marshall and Shelley had initially met after she played a show opening for Liz Phair in 1993. A total of 20 songs were recorded in a single day by the trio, all of which were split into two records, making up Dear Sir and Myra Lee.

According to Foljahn, the recording session was "mellow" and "quick," and he referred to their recording space— purportedly a moist basement lined with musical equipment and empty beer cans— as "literally the third subbasement. It was so New York." Contrarily, Marshall described the recording session as "anxiety-ridden." "Most of the time Steve and Tim ended up looking at each other like, "What do we do"?" said Marshall. "I wasn't sure what to tell them since I had never really written songs with a band in mind."

Although Dear Sir is considered Marshall's debut album, she said in a 1996 interview that she considered it an EP.

== Artwork ==
The cover artwork for the album features a man's torso with apparent stream of consciousness prose superimposed over it. The text reads:

dear CAT POWER sir i have heaviness with a dr. molkner sir it's rabbit stew with you it's you it's you sir we've got the rabbit stew this time – and i'm in you i'm in you sir with a heavy line a very fine line indeed mr. wolfe it's heavy – stew it's heavy stroot like it it's god i would like you to meet and marry and have many smaller ones with my cousin pete you're a lot alike believe it about mr. warner tell him to change the stuff fuck this shit i'm hit that's bobby clayton for ya that's bobby please come to dinner some nite with molkner we're having rabbit stew call pete say hello and eat him then put him into a rabbit with bobby molkner and eat him raw with dr. molkner dr. molkner's no joke – he's heavy like me we've got heaviness with a doctor it's doctortorial molk's no joke love you sissy ass candy person CAT POWER sir --

According to Marshall, the text came from a letter given to her friend by a mentally ill elderly man who lived in the same hotel as she did:

"My friend Jennifer used to live in the hotel and there was this old man and I guess he was crazy and nobody wanted to say hello to him and she would always say hello to him and you know, kind of took a liking to him. One day, she saw him being taken away by the proverbial white coat, as one might say. He was really sad and reached into his pocket and gave her the note before they took him away. It was three rectangular pieces of paper taped together that were very dated, and the paper was very dated, disintegrating..."

Marshall said that she added in her band name, Cat Power, but the rest of the text was lifted entirely from the letter. "It said everything that was there. It may have been in Savannah, actually. It's sort of in memory of him. Like, where is he now? If that was written to him, then does that mean that he was gay?"

== Release ==
Dear Sir was released in October 1995 on Runt Records, an independent Italian label. This release featured a total of only eight tracks.

On July 3, 2001, Plain Recordings reissued the album with the additional track "Great Expectations", giving the album a total of nine tracks (note that another version of the song "Great Expectations" is also featured on Cat Power's second album, Myra Lee). Both versions of Dear Sir end with the song "Headlights", which is a re-recording of an early song by Marshall's first backing band, and had previously been released as a 7" single in 1993.

As of 1999, the album has sold around 10,000 copies.

== Reception ==
Professional ratings
Review scores
Source	Rating
AllMusic	3/5 stars
Rolling Stone	3/5 stars
Treble Magazine	7.4/10 stars
The Rolling Stone Album Guide	3/5 stars

Rob Sheffield of Rolling Stone awarded the album three out of five stars. Heather Phares of AllMusic wrote that the album "spotlights Chan Marshall's demanding but rewarding songwriting. Her distinctive blend of blues, country, folk and punk creates songs like the dark, noisy "Itchyhead" and "Rockets," which mixes tension and hope, and tops it with Marshall's earnest, expressive vocals."

Writing for Treble magazine, Jeff Terich described the album as having a "a bluesy, melancholy approach that comes wrapped up in a lot of soul and a lot of tears. Aesthetically, though, Dear Sir is mostly a low-key, lo-fi indie rock album that displays Chan Marshall’s songwriting at its rawest."

== Track listing ==
All tracks are written by Chan Marshall, except where noted.

1995 release (Runt6)
No.	Title	Writer(s)	Length
1.	"3 Times"		4:13
2.	"Rockets"		4:43
3.	"Itchyhead"		2:44
4.	"Yesterday Is Here"	Tom Waits; Kathleen Brennan	3:34
5.	"The Sleepwalker"	Chris Matthews	4:02
6.	"Mr. Gallo"		3:19
7.	"No Matter" (instrumental)		1:02
8.	"Headlights"		4:03
Total length:			27:40

2001 reissue (Plain102)
No.	Title	Writer(s)	Length
1.	"3 Times"		4:13
2.	"Rockets"		4:43
3.	"Itchyhead"		2:44
4.	"Yesterday Is Here"	Tom Waits; Kathleen Brennan	3:34
5.	"The Sleepwalker"	Chris Matthews	4:02
6.	"Mr. Gallo"		3:19
7.	"No Matter" (instrumental)		1:02
8.	"Great Expectations"		4:13
9.	"Headlights"		4:03
Total length:			31:53

== Personnel ==
- Chan Marshall – vocals, guitar
- Tim Foljahn – guitar
- Steve Shelley – drums, percussion

Technical

- Ed Douglas – recording, mixing

== Sources ==
- Goodman, Elizabeth (2009). Cat Power: A Good Woman. Three Rivers Press. ISBN 978-0-307-39636-5.
