= What Would the Community Think =

Studio album by Cat Power
- Released: September 10, 1996
- Recorded: February 1996
- Studios: Easley Studios, Memphis, Tennessee, U.S.
- Genres: Alternative rock; indie rock; folk rock; electric blues
- Length: 47:48
- Label: Matador
- Producer: Steve Shelley

Cat Power chronology
Myra Lee (1996)	What Would the Community Think (1996)	Moon Pix (1998)

Singles from What Would the Community Think
- 1. "Nude as the News" Released: December 12, 1996

What Would the Community Think is the third studio album by Cat Power, the stage name and eponymous band of American singer-songwriter Chan Marshall. Recorded at Easley Studios in Memphis, Tennessee, the album was released in 1996 on Matador Records, and was her first release on the label.

The album was produced by Sonic Youth drummer Steve Shelley, who also provided drums during the recording sessions. What Would the Community Think has been noted for its variety of musical styles, ranging from alternative rock to folk and blues. Though not a commercial hit, the album received unanimous critical acclaim.

== Recording ==
What Would the Community Think was recorded in February 1996 at Easley Studios in Memphis, Tennessee. The sessions marked the first time Marshall had recorded in a professional recording space, as her previous two releases had been recorded in a makeshift studio in New York City. During the recording sessions, Marshall was reportedly ill with a cold, which required her to strain her voice during the recording sessions. Many of the vocal and guitar tracks were recorded by Marshall in single takes.

Recounting the recording process, Marshall recalled: "I got to do things, I got to direct it a little. The other times we just pressed the record—this time I got to branch out and figure out where I thought it should go."

== Songs ==
The tracks on What Would The Community Think have been noted for their blending of blues, alternative rock, and country, as well as for their largely melancholy lyrical subject matter. The songs on the album range from "rhythmic dirges" (such as "Good Clean Fun") to down-tempo tracks ("Taking People," "Water & Air"). Marshall also incorporated elements of hymns and old blues standards: the track "They Tell Me" specifically contains Southern-inspired lyrics sung over a classic blues guitar riff. The album features two cover songs: "The Fate of the Human Carbine," an "angry singsong" cover written by New Zealand singer-songwriter Peter Jefferies, and "Bathysphere" by Bill Callahan, whom Marshall had formerly dated.

The lead single, "Nude as the News" was Cat Power's first song to receive an official music video in 1997, directed by Brett Vapnek. In retrospect, Marshall has divulged that the ambiguous lyrics to the song were written about an abortion she had in 1992, and the names "Jackson" and "Jesse" in the song are references to Patti Smith's two children.

== Cover artwork ==
The cover artwork for the album was created by Chan Marshall out of a postcard: "I just needed a cover and I had this postcard that I've had for a long time. It's this woman from the '70s in New York and they did this collage of cigarette ads and she whited out the eyes and instead of a cigarette she had a whistle. It's no big deal, I just cut out the center of her face and put mine on top. It made it look more real."

== Reception ==
Professional ratings
Review scores
Source	Rating
AllMusic	4/5 stars
Alternative Press	5/5
Entertainment Weekly	A
NME	6/10
The Rolling Stone Album Guide	4/5 stars
Spin	4/5 stars
The Tampa Tribune	3/4 stars

Michele Romero of Entertainment Weekly wrote that Marshall "raises goose bumps on What Would the Community Think with bluesy, traumatized songs on which she whispers laments over a spare arrangement of guitar and drums. A sudden fervent holler — to the father of her unborn child or to her own lacking papa — interrupts the calm like thoughts of mortality in the night." Rolling Stone's Rob Sheffield called the album "leaner and tougher" than her previous releases, adding: "It's a quiet album, but the songs get more powerful the closer you listen, as Marshall testifies to her unbearable longing for an unbearable love."

Music critic Mark Groescher wrote of the album: "Listening to What Would The Community Think is like watching a friend on the verge of losing her mind. It is a wild and sometimes disturbing ride, but it is completely honest. And like any great blues album, it is contagious." Biographer Elizabeth Goodman referred to the album as Marshall's "most violent, angry work, a deranged epic filled with sadness, guilt, and defiance."

Rommie Johnson of The Tampa Tribune described the album as "Quiet, [but not] mellow... Cat Power builds tension through repetition, then eerily cuts things off without a trace of resolution... her understated tales of epistemological doubt may just be missives to herself. More often than not, Marshall sounds like a woman alone with her thoughts."

Marshall claimed in a 2022 interview that she was offered a million dollars by a "guy who went on to manage Gwen Stefani" to buy the album, which she refused.

== Track listing ==
All tracks are written by Chan Marshall, except where noted.

No.	Title	Writer(s)	Length
1.	"In This Hole"		4:59
2.	"Good Clean Fun"		4:46
3.	"What Would the Community Think"		4:30
4.	"Nude as the News"		4:23
5.	"They Tell Me"		2:53
6.	"Taking People"		3:25
7.	"The Fate of the Human Carbine"	Peter Jefferies	2:58
8.	"King Rides By"		4:03
9.	"Bathysphere"	Bill Callahan	3:01
10.	"Water & Air"		4:43
11.	"Enough"		4:25
12.	"The Coat Is Always On"		3:34
Total length:			47:40

== Personnel ==
- Chan Marshall – vocals, guitar, piano
- Tim Foljahn – guitar
- Steve Shelley – drums, xylophone, production
- Doug Easley – pedal steel

== Sources ==
- Goodman, Elizabeth (2009). Cat Power: A Good Woman. Three Rivers Press. ISBN 978-0-307-39636-5.
