= The Covers Record =

Studio album by Cat Power
- Released: March 21, 2000
- Recorded: 1998–1999
- Studios: Night Owl, Kampo and Rare Book Room (New York City)
- Genre: Indie rock
- Length: 40:58
- Label: Matador
- Producer: Cat Power

Cat Power chronology
Moon Pix (1998)	The Covers Record (2000)	You Are Free (2003)

The Covers Record is the fifth studio album by Cat Power, the stage name and eponymous band of American singer-songwriter Chan Marshall. It was released in 2000 on Matador Records.

The album consists entirely of cover songs, with the exception of a new version of Marshall's song "In this Hole," which initially appeared on Cat Power's 1996 album What Would the Community Think.

== Background ==
The success of Cat Power's fourth album, Moon Pix (1998), led to high expectations for her follow-up, and made it difficult for her to live what she called “a normal life.” She elected to release an album of covers in part because she felt more comfortable playing covers than her own material. Between Moon Pix and what became The Covers Record, she scheduled a number of solo shows during which she played only covers. In order to take attention away from herself, she projected the 1928 French silent film The Passion of Joan of Arc behind her onstage.

Marshall's decision to release a covers album was reportedly disappointing to Matador, who considered her a “genius songwriter” and wanted to capitalize on the success of Moon Pix. According to Gerard Cosloy, the promotional campaign for The Covers Record, which he calls “a great album,” was intentionally “muted,” in order to allow it to “find its audience.” However, Marshall saw The Covers Record as a personal and important release, and interpreted this as lack of faith on the record company's behalf in the record's ability to connect with her audience.

Marshall's contract for The Covers Record was allegedly drafted on the spot on a Post-it note.

== Recording ==
The Covers Record features sparse instrumentation, with only Marshall on vocals and guitar or piano. The song “Salty Dog” features guitar by American musician Matt Sweeney.

The album was recorded at Night Owl Studios, Kampo Studios and Rare Book Room Studios, in New York City, in 1998 and 1999. According to Marshall, “I ended up in the studio recording with this young man at this place called Night Owl Studios across from Penn Station. I did most of the songs there just very, very, very, very quickly, and there’s like four songs that are from different recording sessions.”

== Reception and legacy ==
Professional ratings
Aggregate scores
Source	Rating
Metacritic	81/100
Review scores
Source	Rating
AllMusic	3.5/5 stars
Alternative Press	3/5
Entertainment Weekly	B+
The Guardian	4/5 stars
Houston Chronicle	4/5
NME	7/10
Pitchfork	7.6/10
Rolling Stone	3/5 stars
The Rolling Stone Album Guide	4/5 stars
Spin	7/10

Rob Sheffield of Rolling Stone called the album "a stopgap" until the release of her next album of original material, but described her stripped-down version of the Rolling Stones' "Satisfaction" as "powerful." Spin called the album "essential," and wrote, "With only a guitar or piano, and a voice that is developing into one of the most expressive in rock, Marshall crafts deeply textured explorations of heartache, terror, longing, dismay, and emotions I'm pretty sure I've not found yet.... Rock will see few finer releases this year." Rhapsody (online music service) praised the album, calling it one of their favorite cover albums.

Dave Grohl, vocalist and guitarist of the Foo Fighters and former drummer of Nirvana, cited the album in a 2000 issue of NME, saying, "'Satisfaction' is the hit off that record, or so everybody thinks. But for me, it's that Velvet Underground song, "I Found a Reason". It's beautiful, beautiful, beautiful. My favourite." Grohl would work with Marshall on Cat Power's subsequent release, You Are Free (2003).

In 2005 the album was performed live in its entirety as part of the All Tomorrow's Parties-curated Don't Look Back series.

Several songs on the album have been used in films, including "I Found a Reason" (Saving Face, Dandelion and V for Vendetta), "Sea of Love" (Juno), and "Wild Is the Wind" (Into the Forest).

== Track listing ==
No.	Title	Writer(s)	Original artist(s)	Length
1.	"(I Can't Get No) Satisfaction"	Mick Jagger, Keith Richards	The Rolling Stones	3:05
2.	"Kingsport Town"	Traditional	Bob Dylan	4:54
3.	"Troubled Waters"	Arthur Johnston, Sam Coslow	Mae West with Duke Ellington's Orchestra	3:29
4.	"Naked, If I Want To"	Jerry A. Miller Jr.	Moby Grape	2:47
5.	"Sweedeedee"	Michael Hurley	Michael Hurley	3:53
6.	"In This Hole"	Chan Marshall	Cat Power	4:26
7.	"I Found a Reason"	Lou Reed	The Velvet Underground	2:00
8.	"Wild Is the Wind"	Dimitri Tiomkin, Ned Washington	Johnny Mathis	4:10
9.	"Red Apples"	Bill Callahan	Smog	4:24
10.	"Paths of Victory"	Bob Dylan	Bob Dylan	3:24
11.	"Salty Dog"	Traditional	Papa Charlie Jackson	2:07
12.	"Sea of Love"	Philip Baptiste, George Khoury	Phil Phillips	2:19
Total length:				40:58

Japanese bonus track
No.	Title	Length
13.	"Love to Be Silly"	1:34
Total length:		42:32

== Personnel ==
- Chan Marshall – vocals, guitar, piano
- Matt Sweeney – guitar ("Salty Dog")

== Charts ==
Album – Billboard

Year	Chart	Position
2000	Heatseekers	44

As of March 2003, it has sold 52,000 units in the United States. Combined sales of The Covers Record and Moon Pix are 200,000 copies, as of 2001. As of 2023, "Sea of Love" was certified gold in Canada.
