= Cat Power =

American singer-songwriter

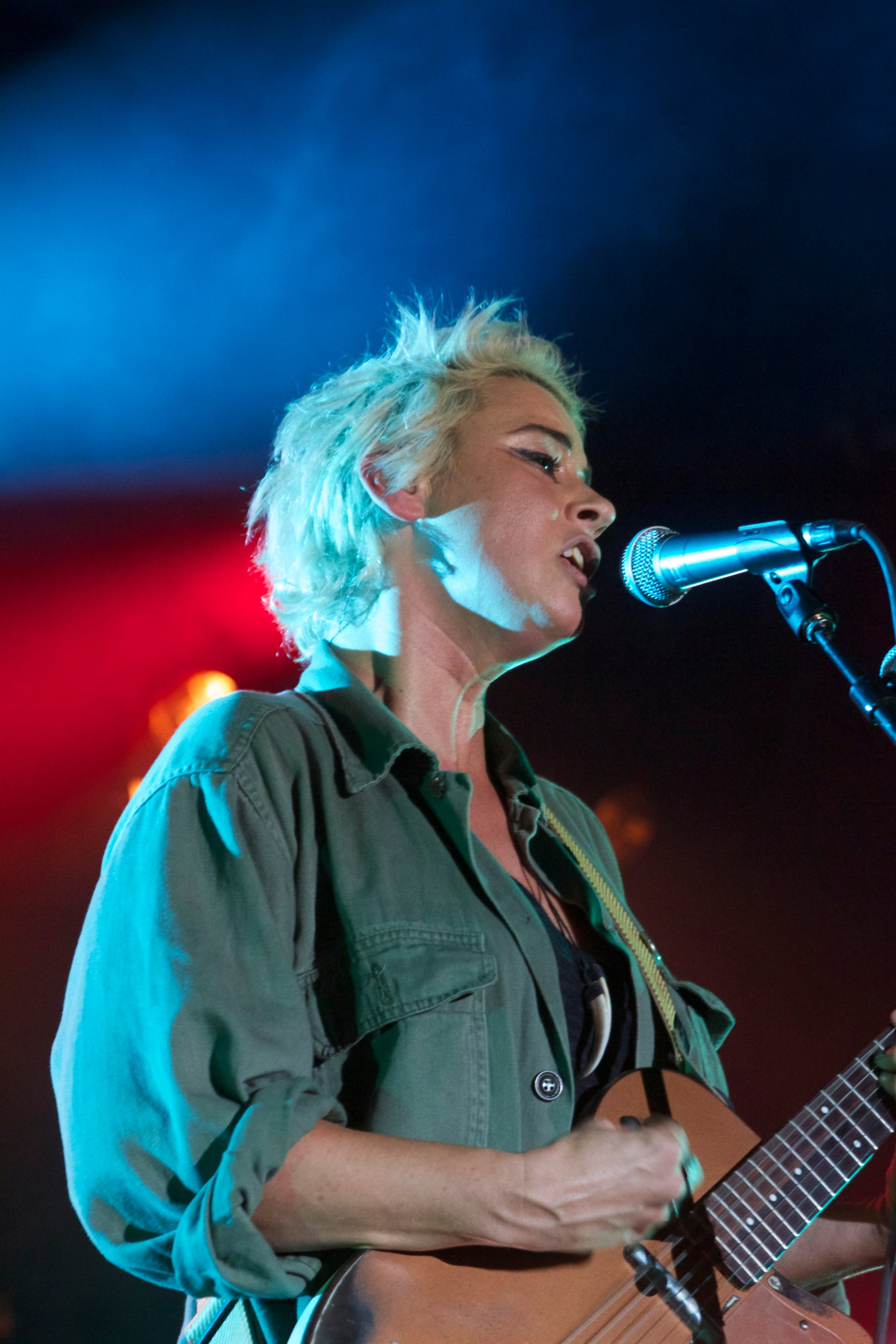
- Cat Power in Hamburg, 2013

Background information
- Also known as: Chan Marshall; Cat Power
- Born: Charlyn Marie Marshall; January 21, 1972 (age 54); Atlanta, Georgia, U.S.
- Genres: Indie rock; folk rock; electric blues; alternative rock; lo-fi; sadcore
- Occupations: Singer-songwriter; musician; model
- Instruments: Vocals; guitar; piano
- Years active: 1992–present
- Labels: Runt; Smells Like Records; Matador; Domino
- Website: catpowermusic.com

Charlyn Marie "Chan" Marshall (/ˈʃɔːn/ SHAWN; born January 21, 1972), better known by her stage name Cat Power, is an American singer-songwriter. Cat Power was originally the name of her first band, but has become her stage name as a solo artist.

Born in Atlanta, Marshall was raised throughout the southern United States and began performing in local bands in Atlanta in the early 1990s. After opening for Liz Phair in 1993, she worked with Steve Shelley of Sonic Youth and Tim Foljahn of Two Dollar Guitar, with whom she recorded her first two albums, Dear Sir (1995) and Myra Lee (1996), on the same day in 1994. In 1996, she signed with Matador Records, and released a third album of new material with Shelley and Foljahn, What Would the Community Think. Following this, she released the critically acclaimed Moon Pix (1998), recorded with members of Dirty Three, and The Covers Record (2000), a collection of sparsely arranged cover songs.

After a brief hiatus she released You Are Free (2003), featuring guest musicians Dave Grohl and Eddie Vedder, followed by the soul-influenced The Greatest (2006), recorded with numerous Memphis studio musicians. A second album of cover tracks, Jukebox, was released in 2008. In 2012 she released the self-produced Sun, which debuted at number 10 on the Billboard 200, the highest-charting album of her career to date.

Critics have noted the constant evolution of Cat Power's sound, with a mix of punk, folk and blues on her earliest albums, and elements of soul and other genres more prevalent in her later material.

== Early life ==
Charlyn Marie Marshall was born January 21, 1972, in Atlanta, Georgia, the second child of Charlie Marshall, a blues musician and pianist, and Myra Lee Marshall (née Russell). She has one older sister, Miranda ("Mandy"). Her maternal grandfather was of Native American ancestry. Her parents divorced in 1979 and remarried shortly thereafter. Her mother remarried and had a son, Lenny, and the family traveled around often because of her stepfather's profession. She is also Jewish on her paternal side of the family.

Marshall attended ten different schools throughout the Southern U.S. in Greensboro; Bartlett and Memphis and throughout Georgia and South Carolina. At times she was left in the care of her grandmother. She was not allowed to buy records when she was growing up, but she listened to her stepfather's record collection, which included artists Otis Redding, Creedence Clearwater Revival and the Rolling Stones, as well as her parents' records, which included Black Flag, Sister Sledge, and Barry White. In sixth grade, she adopted the nickname Chan (pronounced "Shawn"), which she would later use professionally. When she was 13, she listened to the Smiths, the Cure and Siouxsie and the Banshees. She had to save up to buy cassettes and the first one she got was a record by the Misfits. As a high schooler in Atlanta, she saw shows by punk bands including a Cramps show at which Flat Duo Jets opened. She has referenced multiple times the influence of Dex Romweber from Flat Duo Jets, and she bought her first guitar because it looked like his black and white Silvertone. At age 16, Marshall dropped out of high school and became estranged from her mother, having no further contact with her until she was 24.

Religion was a large part of Marshall's upbringing; her father was a Jehovah's Witness, though she attended Southern Baptist churches with her grandmother, where she began singing while learning hymns.

== Career ==
=== 1992–1995: Beginnings ===
Marshall's first instrument was a 1950s Silvertone guitar, which she taught herself to play. While working in a pizzeria, she began playing music in Atlanta in the late-1980s with Glen Thrasher, Marc Moore, Damon Moore and Fletcher Liegerot, who would get together for jam sessions in a basement. The group was booked for a show and had to come up with a name quickly; after seeing a man wearing a Caterpillar trucker cap that read: "Cat Diesel Power", Marshall chose Cat Power as the name of the band.

While in Atlanta, Marshall played her first live shows as support to her friends' bands, including Magic Bone and Opal Foxx Quartet. In a 2007 interview, she explained that the music itself was more experimental and that playing shows was often an opportunity for her and her friends "to get drunk and take drugs". A number of her local peers became entrenched in heroin use. After the death of her boyfriend, and the subsequent loss of her best friend to AIDS, Marshall relocated to New York City in 1992 with Glen Thrasher. A new boyfriend helped her get a job in a restaurant.

Thrasher introduced her to New York's free jazz and experimental music scene. After attending a concert by Anthony Braxton, she gave her first New York show of improvisational music at a warehouse in Brooklyn. One of her shows during this period was as the support act to Man or Astro-man? and consisted of her playing a two-string guitar and singing the word "no" for 15 minutes. Around this time, she met the band God Is My Co-Pilot, who assisted with the release of her first single, "Headlights", in a limited run of 500 copies on their Making of Americans label.

Marshall recorded simultaneously her first two albums Dear Sir and Myra Lee in December 1994 in a small basement studio near Mott Street in New York City, with guitarist Tim Foljahn and Sonic Youth drummer Steve Shelley; Marshall and Shelley had initially met after she played a show opening for Liz Phair in 1993. A total of 20 songs were recorded in a single day by the trio, all of which were split into two records, making up Dear Sir and Myra Lee, released respectively in October 1995 and March 1996. Although Dear Sir is considered Marshall's debut album, it is more the length of an EP.

=== 1996–2003: Early Matador releases ===
In 1996, Marshall signed to Matador Records. In September of that year, she released her third album, What Would the Community Think, which she recorded in Memphis, Tennessee, in February 1996. The album was produced by Shelley and again featured Shelley and Foljahn as backing musicians, and spawned a single and music video, "Nude as the News" about the abortion she had at the age of 20. Critics cited the album as evidence of her maturation as a singer and songwriter from the "dense and cathartic" material of her first two releases.

After the release of What Would the Community Think, Marshall took a trip to South Africa. After this, she left New York City and moved to Portland, Oregon, where she found temporary employment as a babysitter. In the spring of 1997, Marshall relocated with her then-boyfriend, musician Bill Callahan, to a rural farmhouse in Prosperity, South Carolina. After experiencing a hypnogogic nightmare while alone in the farmhouse, Marshall wrote six new songs that would go on to make up the bulk of her following album, Moon Pix (1998), which she recorded at Sing Sing Studios in Melbourne, Australia, with backing musicians Mick Turner and Jim White of the Australian band Dirty Three. Moon Pix was well received by critics, and along with an accompanying music video for the song "Cross Bones Style", helped her gain further recognition. Rolling Stone would later describe it as her 'breakthrough' record.

In 1999, Marshall performed in a series of shows where she provided musical accompaniment to the silent movie The Passion of Joan of Arc. The shows combined original material and covers, some of which would be released on Marshall's fifth album, The Covers Record in 2000. The songs were recorded during two sessions in the summer of 1998 and fall of 1999. Additionally, she performed eleven covers during a Peel session broadcast on June 18, 2000, that included her own interpretations of Bob Dylan's "Hard Times in New York Town" and Oasis's "Wonderwall". Her contract with Matador for 2000's The Covers Album reportedly consisted of a Post-it note signed by herself and the company's founder.

During the early-2000s, Marshall was embraced by the fashion industry for her "neo grunge" look, and seen as a muse by designers Marc Jacobs and Nicolas Ghesquière. In 2001 she modeled in New York magazine's fall fashion issue and was photographed by her friends Mark Borthwick and Katja Rahlwes, who featured her in Purple magazine alongside Catherine Deneuve.

In February 2003, Marshall released You Are Free, her first album of original material in five years. The album, which featured guest musicians such as Eddie Vedder, Dave Grohl, and Warren Ellis, became the first charting Cat Power album, reaching 105 on the Billboard 200. A music video directed by Brett Vapnek was released for the song "He War". Marshall toured extensively through 2003 and 2004, playing shows in Europe, Brazil, the U.S. and Australia. During this period, Marshall's live performances had become erratic and unpredictable, and a 2003 The New Yorker article suggested: "It is foolhardy to describe a Cat Power event as a concert," citing "rambling confessions" and "[talking] to a friend's baby from the stage." Marshall later attributed this period to a drinking problem. Around the time of the release of You Are Free, Marshall purchased a house in South Beach, Miami.

=== 2004–2011: Mainstream success ===
In October 2004, Matador released the DVD film Speaking for Trees, which featured a continuous, nearly two-hour static shot of Marshall performing with her guitar in a woodland. The set was accompanied by an audio CD containing the 18-minute song "Willie Deadwilder", featuring M. Ward also on guitar.

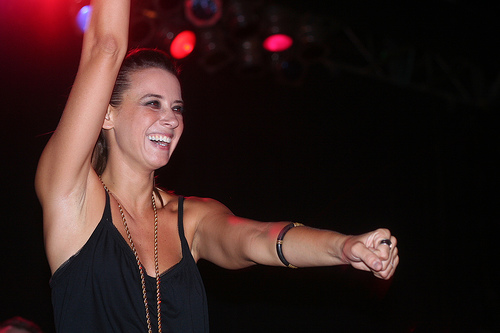
Marshall performing in Philadelphia, 2006

On January 22, 2006, Marshall released her seventh album, The Greatest, a Southern soul-influenced album of new material featuring veteran Memphis studio musicians, including Mabon "Teenie" Hodges, Leroy Hodges, David Smith, and Steve Potts. The album debuted at 34 on the Billboard 200 and critics noted its relatively "polished and accessible" sound, predicting it was "going to gain her a lot of new fans." The Greatest met with critical acclaim, and won the 2006 Shortlist Music Prize, making Marshall the first woman to win the honor. It was also named the number 6 best album of 2006 by Rolling Stone Magazine.

Simultaneously, Marshall collaborated with several other musicians on different projects, including Mick Collins on a recording of Ludwig Rellstab's poem "Auf Dem Strom" for the film Wayne County Ramblin'; a duet with singer-model Karen Elson on an English cover of Serge Gainsbourg's "Je t'aime... moi non plus" for the tribute album Monsieur Gainsbourg Revisited (2007); lead vocals on the Ensemble track "Disown, Delete"; and a reworked version of "Revelations" with Yoko Ono for Ono's 2007 album Yes, I'm a Witch.

In the fall of 2006, Marshall became a celebrity spokesperson for a line of jewelry from Chanel, after being seen by Karl Lagerfeld smoking a cigarette outside the Mercer Hotel in New York. Lagerfeld chose Cat Power for the soundtrack to his spring 2007 fashion show. He also photographed Marshall for a Purple feature.

In 2007, Marshall contributed songs to the soundtrack of Ethan Hawke's film The Hottest State, recording with Jesse Harris and Terry Manning, and the Academy Award-winning film Juno. The same year, she made her feature film debut acting in My Blueberry Nights opposite Jude Law, appearing in a small role. She also appeared in the role of a postal worker in Doug Aitken's MoMA installation Sleepwalkers, which followed the nocturnal lives of five city dwellers. Also in 2007, she featured on Faithless' album track A Kind of Peace.

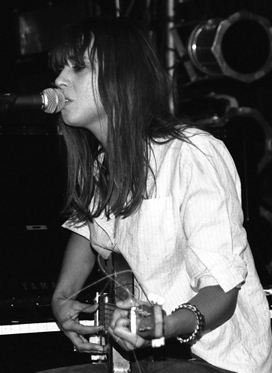
Marshall performing at All Tomorrow's Parties Festival, London, 2008

In January 2008, Marshall released her second covers album, Jukebox. Recorded with her recently assembled "Dirty Delta Blues Band", which consisted of Judah Bauer from the Blues Explosion, Gregg Foreman of The Delta 72, Erik Paparazzi of Lizard Music and Jim White of Dirty Three, the album featured the original song "Song to Bobby", Marshall's tribute to Bob Dylan, and a reworking of the Moon Pix song "Metal Heart". She also collaborated with Beck and producer Danger Mouse on the album Modern Guilt (2008): She contributed backing vocals to two tracks, "Orphans" and "Walls". The album was released in July of that year.

In September 2008, Marshall and members of the Dirty Delta Blues (Erik Paparazzi and Gregg Foreman) recorded their version of David Bowie's "Space Oddity" for a Lincoln car commercial. In 2013, Cat Power's version of "Have Yourself a Merry Little Christmas" was used in Apple's Christmas commercial "Misunderstood". In December 2008, she released Dark End of the Street, an EP consisting of songs left over from the Jukebox sessions. In 2009, she provided backing vocals on Marianne Faithfull's cover of "Hold On, Hold On" by Neko Case on the 2009 album Easy Come Easy Go. In 2011, she also featured as guest vocalist on "Tonight You Belong to Me" on Eddie Vedder's Ukulele Songs.

=== 2012–present: Recent activity ===
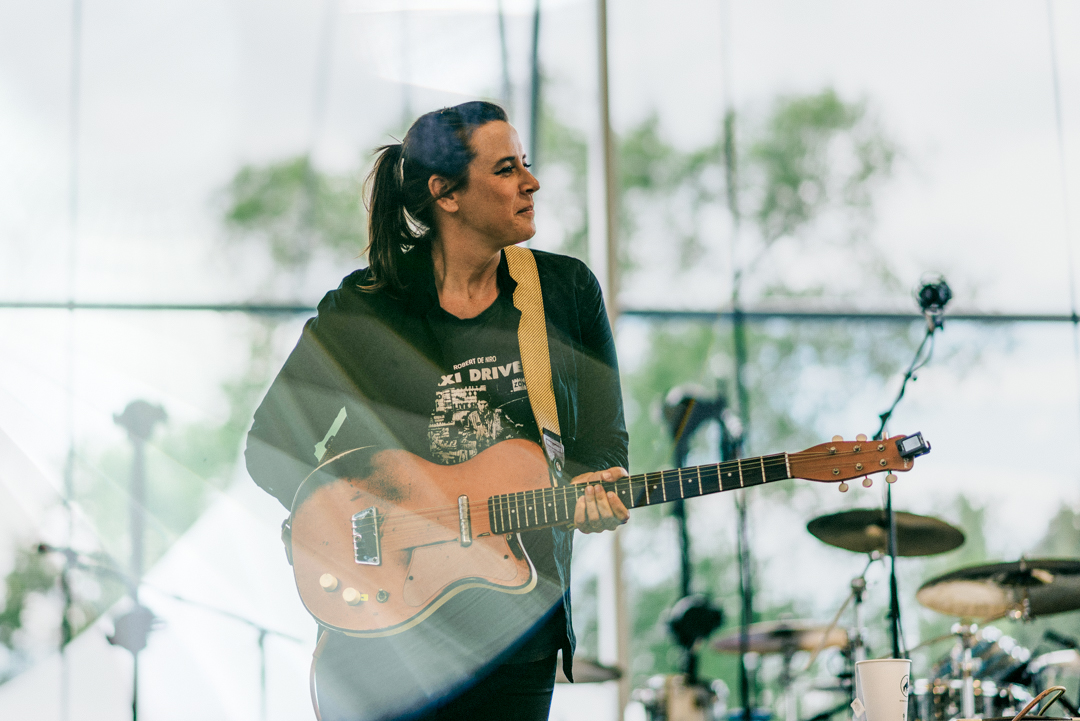
Marshall performing in Edmonton, Alberta, 2016

In February 2012, Marshall cancelled a scheduled appearance in Tel Aviv, Israel, citing "much confusion" and that she felt "sick in her spirit." She had faced calls to boycott the country over its conflict with Palestine. Two months later, she cancelled her appearance at the Coachella Music Festival, claiming that she "didn't think it was fair to play Coachella while my new album is not yet finished," also hinting that her forthcoming record is "almost done" and will see release later in 2012. Marshall's ninth studio album, Sun, was released in September 2012, after releasing the lead single "Ruin" as a free download the previous June. The album features prominent electronica elements and arrangements, which Marshall incorporated into the "really slow guitar-based songs" she had originally written. In a review published on September 4, 2012, on Consequence of Sound, Sun was praised as a unique album and received a four-star rating. In summation, reviewer Sarah Grant wrote that Marshall's 2012 release is "a passionate pop album of electronic music filtered through a singer-songwriter's soul." The album debuted at a career chart-high of No. 10 on the Billboard 200 chart, selling over 23,000 copies on its opening week.

In July 2015, it was announced that Marshall would be providing narration for the documentary Janis: Little Girl Blue directed by Amy J. Berg, which revolves around the life of Janis Joplin and premiered at the 2015 Venice Film Festival. On television, Marshall starred on China, IL, in the hourlong musical special "Magical Pet". Marshall performs three original songs written by creator Brad Neely.

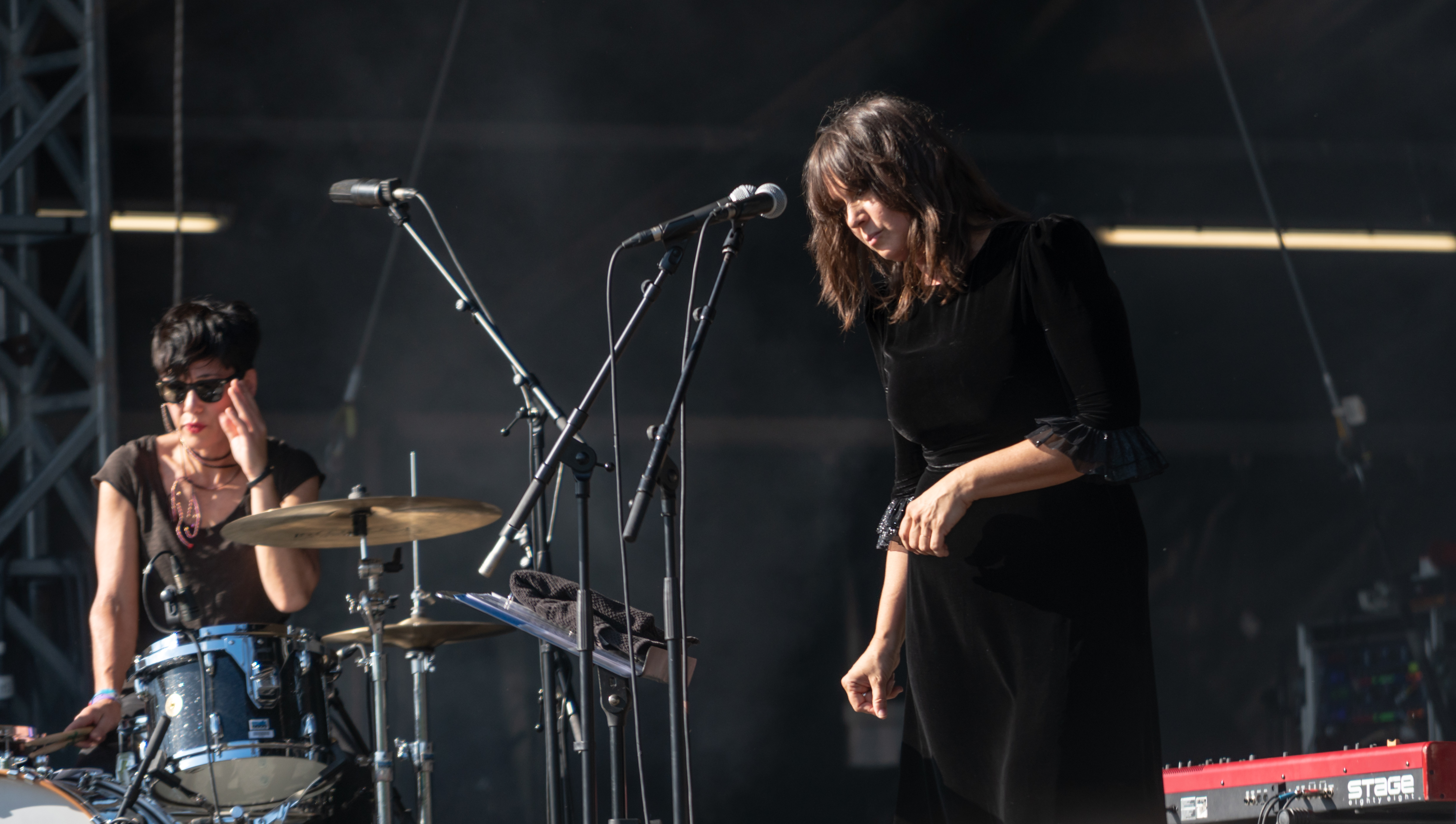
Marshall (right) performing in London, 2018

On July 28, 2017, Marshall announced on Instagram that her tenth studio album was "ready to go", although she did not disclose its title or expected release date.

On March 20, 2018, it was announced that Marshall would perform a Moon Pix 20th anniversary concert at Sydney Opera House, which occurred from May 25 to June 16 and featured album collaborators Jim White and Mick Turner.

After twenty-two years with Matador, Cat Power left them and signed with Domino records a year later for her 10th studio album, Wanderer, which was released in 2018. It was her first to not be released on Matador Records since 1996. According to Marshall, Matador were not happy with the recordings for Wanderer, they wanted her to rerecord it and make it sound more commercial. She released two more singles, "Woman" featuring Lana Del Rey on August 15 and a cover of Rihanna's "Stay" on September 18, before the album was released on October 5, 2018, through Domino Recording Company. She embarked on a world tour in promotion of the album in September.

Power embarked on a US arena tour in August 2021 supporting Alanis Morissette and Garbage. She was a last-minute addition to the lineup, after original opening act Liz Phair canceled her appearances. Power contributed four new songs to the soundtrack of the 2021 film Flag Day. Her eleventh studio album, Covers, was released on January 14, 2022, and was supported by a US tour.

Marshall released her first live album on November 10, 2023, Cat Power Sings Dylan: The 1966 Royal Albert Hall Concert. The album is a recreation of Bob Dylan's 1966 concert at Manchester Free Trade Hall, although early bootlegs mislabeled the concert as being recorded at the Royal Albert Hall. In February 2024, Marshall embarked on a tour in support of the album, in which she recreated Dylan's 1966 performance at venues across the United States and Europe.

In celebration of the 20th anniversary of her seventh studio album, 2006 release The Greatest, Marshall recorded Redux in 2025. Redux is a three-song EP recorded by Stuart Sikes in Austin with members of The Greatest tour band the Dirty Delta Blues and was released January 23, 2026.

== Personal life ==
In 2005, Marshall entered a relationship with actor Giovanni Ribisi, and resided with Ribisi and his daughter in Los Angeles. They also had a rental house in Malibu where she had a studio. Following the release of The Greatest, Marshall canceled her impending spring 2006 tour, and used the hiatus to recover from mental health problems. As part of her recovery, she was admitted to the psychiatric ward at Mount Sinai Medical Center & Miami Heart Institute, leaving after a week. Marshall gave a first person account of her breakdown in an interview for the November 2006 issue of Spin.

In June 2012, it was reported that Marshall had ended her relationship with Ribisi, and the completion of her upcoming record had coincided with their breakup: "I cut my hair off three days [after the breakup], got on a plane to France, and finished the shit." Shortly after the release of Sun, Marshall began having trouble breathing and was hospitalized multiple times, though doctors were unable to diagnose her. "I thought I was dying," she recounted. "They told me they were going to put me in a coma to save my lungs. My friend came to visit and told me I'd made the Billboard Top 10 and all I could think was: 'I don't want to die.'" Marshall was subsequently diagnosed with hereditary angioedema, an immune disorder that causes sporadic swelling of the face and throat due to C1 esterase inhibitor deficiency. In September 2012, she stated she had been hospitalized owing to the condition over eight times, which led her to cancel her European tour.

In April 2015, Marshall announced that she had recently given birth to a son, but did not name the child's father.

== Artistry ==
=== Musical style ===
Marshall's releases as Cat Power have frequently been noted by critics for their somber, blues-influenced instrumentation and melancholy lyrics, leading LA Weekly to dub her the "queen of sadcore". Marshall, however, claims that her music is often misinterpreted, and that many of her songs are "not sad, [but] triumphant". She has claimed blues, soul music, British rock 'n' roll, as well as hymns and gospel music as integral influences on her.

Cat Power's early releases have been described as blending elements of punk, folk, and blues, while her later releases (post-2000) began to incorporate more sophisticated arrangements and production. The Greatest (2006), Marshall's seventh release, was heavily soul-influenced and incorporated R&B elements; the Memphis Rhythm Band provided backing instrumentation on the album. Unlike her previous releases, which featured sparse guitar and piano arrangements, The Greatest was described by Marshall biographer Sarah Goodman as her first "full-blown studio record with sophisticated production and senior players backing [Marshall] up".

=== Performances ===
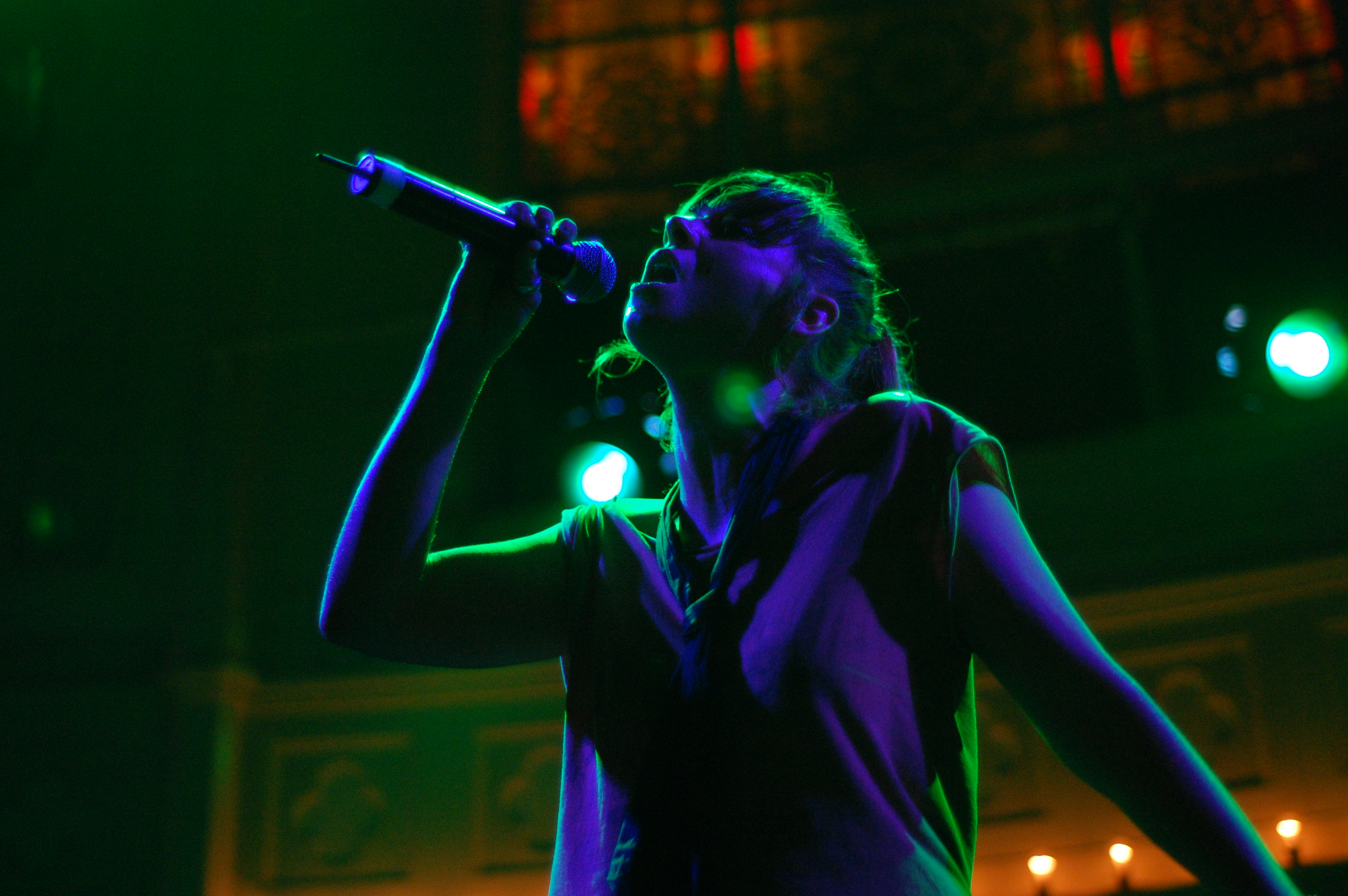
Cat Power performing in Amsterdam, Netherlands, 2008

Marshall's live shows have been known for their unpolished and often erratic nature, with songs beginning and ending abruptly or blending into one another without clear transitions. She has also cut short performances without explanation. On some occasions this has been attributed to stage fright and the influence of alcohol. Marshall has spoken openly about suffering from severe bouts of stage fright, specifically in her early career, and admitted that her stage fright stemmed from issues regarding depression, alcoholism, and substance abuse.

By 2006, she had found new collaborators and had stopped drinking. Marshall's performance style became more enthusiastic and professional; a review in Salon noted that she was "delivering onstage", and called The Greatest "polished and sweetly upbeat".

== Philanthropy and activism ==
A live version of the gospel song "Amazing Grace"—culled from a performance with the Dirty Delta Blues band—was released on the charity compilation Dark Was the Night. Released by independent British label 4AD on February 17, 2009, the set benefited the Red Hot Organization, an international charity dedicated to raising funds and awareness for HIV and AIDS. She also appeared in a PETA ad, encouraging people to spay and neuter their pets.

On December 25, 2011, Marshall released a reworking of the What Would the Community Think track "King Rides By" for download from her official website, with all proceeds from sales of the track being donated to The Festival of Children Foundation and The Ali Forney Center. A music video directed by Giovanni Ribisi and featuring Filipino boxer and politician Manny Pacquiao was released to promote the song.

In 2014, she played a double benefit show in St. Louis for Ferguson activists, at which shirts by artist James Concannon were sold to help raise money for jailed activists.

== Discography ==
Studio albums

- Dear Sir (1995)
- Myra Lee (1996)
- What Would the Community Think (1996)
- Moon Pix (1998)
- The Covers Record (2000)
- You Are Free (2003)
- The Greatest (2006)
- Jukebox (2008)
- Sun (2012)
- Wanderer (2018)
- Covers (2022)

Live albums

- Cat Power Sings Dylan: The 1966 Royal Albert Hall Concert (2023)

== Filmography ==
Film
Year	Film	Role	Notes
2007	Sleepwalkers (short)	Dancer working as a FedEx Clerk	Credited as Chan Marshall
2007	My Blueberry Nights	Katya	Credited as Chan Marshall; also contributed songs "Living Proof" and "The Greatest" to the film's soundtrack
2009	American Widow	Singing Woman	Main Role

Television
Year	Program	Role	Notes
2015	Major Lazer	Knife Fight	Animated series episode "Fizzy Fever"
2015	China, IL	Kei-ko (talking gorilla)	Animated series episode "Magical Pet"

== Awards and nominations ==
- Won: Shortlist Music Prize for The Greatest
- Nominated: Best International Female Solo Artist, 2007 BRIT Awards
- Nominated: Best Art Vinyl for Jukebox
- Nominated: Best International Female Solo Artist, 2013 BRIT Awards
- Nominated: Best Cinematography for "Where Is My Love?", 2007 Antville Music Video Awards
- Nominated: Comeback of the Year, 2018 Rober Awards Music Prize
- Nominated: Best Foreign Solo Act, Wanderer Best Foreign Album, 2019 Sweden GAFFA Awards
- Nominated: Best Pop Video – International for "Go Up", 2017 UK Music Video Awards

== Sources ==
- Earles, Andrew (2014). Gimme Indie Rock: 500 Essential American Underground Rock Albums 1981–1996. Voyageur Press. ISBN 978-0-7603-4648-8.
- Goodman, Elizabeth (2009). Cat Power: A Good Woman. New York: Three Rivers Press. ISBN 978-0-307-44956-6.
- Larkin, Colin (2011). The Encyclopedia of Popular Music. Omnibus Press. ISBN 978-0-85712-595-8.
