= Jukebox (Cat Power album) =

Studio album by Cat Power
- Released: January 22, 2008
- Genre: Indie rock
- Length: 41:33
- Label: Matador

Cat Power chronology
The Greatest (2006)	Jukebox (2008)	Dark End of the Street (2008)

Singles from Jukebox
- 1. "Song to Bobby" Released: 2007; 2. "New York" Released: 2008

Professional ratings
Aggregate scores
Source	Rating
Metacritic	72/100
Review scores
Source	Rating
Allmusic	3.5/5 stars
Drowned In Sound	8/10 stars
The Guardian	3/5 stars
Los Angeles Times	3/4 stars
Mojo	4/5 stars
NME	6/10 stars
Pitchfork Media	(5.7/10)
Rolling Stone	4/5 stars
Spin	3/5 stars
Uncut	4/5 stars

Jukebox is the eighth studio album by Cat Power, released on January 22, 2008 on Matador Records. The album is composed almost entirely of cover songs, save for "Song to Bobby" and "Metal Heart" (previously recorded and released in 1998). It is Marshall's second record of cover songs, after The Covers Record.

A limited-edition silver foil deluxe package was also released containing a bonus disc with five extra songs.

== Commercial performance ==
The album debuted at number 12 on the Billboard 200 chart, selling about 29,000 copies in its first week. As of 2012, sales in the United States have exceeded 137,000 copies, according to Nielsen SoundScan. It was awarded a gold certification from the Independent Music Companies Association which indicated sales of at least 100,000 copies throughout Europe.

== Track listing ==
No.	Title	Writer(s)	Original artist(s)	Length
1.	"New York"	John Kander, Fred Ebb	Liza Minnelli	2:00
2.	"Ramblin' (Wo)man"	Hank Williams	Hank Williams	3:47
3.	"Metal Heart"	Chan Marshall	Cat Power	3:53
4.	"Silver Stallion"	Lee Clayton	The Highwaymen	2:52
5.	"Aretha, Sing One for Me"	J Harris, Eugene William	George Jackson	3:12
6.	"Lost Someone"	James Brown, Bobby Byrd, Lloyd Stallworth	James Brown & the Famous Flames	2:50
7.	"Lord, Help the Poor & Needy"	Jessie Mae Hemphill	Jessie Mae Hemphill	2:37
8.	"I Believe in You"	Bob Dylan	Bob Dylan	4:07
9.	"Song to Bobby" (original composition)	Chan Marshall	Cat Power	4:17
10.	"Don't Explain"	Arthur Herzog Jr., Billie Holiday	Billie Holiday	3:50
11.	"Woman Left Lonely"	Spooner Oldham, Dan Penn	Janis Joplin	4:07
12.	"Blue"	Joni Mitchell	Joni Mitchell	4:01
Total length:				41:33

iTunes Store bonus track
No.	Title	Writer(s)	Original artist(s)	Length
13.	"Could We" (original composition)	Chan Marshall	Cat Power	2:25

Borders bonus track
No.	Title	Writer(s)	Original artist(s)	Length
13.	"Fortunate Son"	J. C. Fogerty	Creedence Clearwater Revival	4:22

Australian bonus track
No.	Title	Writer(s)	Original artist(s)	Length
13.	"Breathless"	Nick Cave	Nick Cave and the Bad Seeds	5:05

Mexican bonus track
No.	Title	Writer(s)	Original artist(s)	Length
13.	"Angelitos Negros"	Andres Eloy Blanco, Manuel Alvarez Maciste	Eartha Kitt	7:33

Limited edition bonus disc
No.	Title	Writer(s)	Original artist(s)	Length
1.	"I Feel"	Dwayne Carter, Christopher Dorsey, Terius Gray, Byron Thomas, Tab Virgil, Jr.	Hot Boys	2:48
2.	"Naked, If I Want To"	Jerry Miller	Moby Grape	2:37
3.	"Breathless"	Nick Cave	Nick Cave and the Bad Seeds	5:05
4.	"Angelitos Negros"	Andres Eloy Blanco, Manuel Alvarez Maciste	Eartha Kitt	7:33
5.	"She's Got You"	Hank Cochran	Patsy Cline	3:30
Total length:				21:33

== Charts ==
Chart	Peak position
Australian Albums (ARIA)	36
Austrian Albums (Ö3 Austria)	40
Belgian Albums (Ultratop Flanders)	10
Belgian Albums (Ultratop Wallonia)	5
Canadian Albums (Billboard)	3
Danish Albums (Hitlisten)	12
Dutch Albums (Album Top 100)	63
French Albums (SNEP)	4
German Albums (Offizielle Top 100)	18
Italian Albums (FIMI)	51
New Zealand Albums (RMNZ)	30
Norwegian Albums (VG-lista)	30
Swedish Albums (Sverigetopplistan)	27
Swiss Albums (Schweizer Hitparade)	20
US Billboard 200	12
US Independent Albums (Billboard)	3
US Top Alternative Albums (Billboard)	2
US Top Rock Albums (Billboard)	2

== Sales ==
Region	Certification	Certified units/sales
United States	—	137,000
Summaries
Europe	—	100,000

== Personnel ==
- Chan Marshall – vocals
- Stuart Sikes – engineer

Dirty Delta Blues

- Judah Bauer – guitar
- Jim White – drums
- Erik Paparazzi – bass
- Gregg Foreman – piano, organ

Special guests

- Spooner Oldham – piano, organ
- Teenie Hodges – guitar
- Larry McDonald – percussion
- Dylan Willemsa – viola
- Matt Sweeney – guitar
