= Mark Borthwick =

British photographer

Mark Borthwick (born 1963) is a British photographer now living in Brooklyn, New York. His photos are often minimal and crisp, yet somewhat 'blown-out' in terms of colour saturation. He has contributed to many publications, including Vogue, George, Purple, and Index. He was also responsible for all the album artwork and promotional material behind Passion Pit's 2012 album "Gossamer". He is married to fashion designer Maria Cornejo, they have a daughter and a son.
