= Myra Lee =

Studio album by Cat Power
- Released: March 4, 1996
- Recorded: December 1994
- Studio: Mott Street space, New York City, New York, U.S.
- Genre: Indie rock; blues rock; lo fi
- Length: 46:17
- Label: Smells Like Records
- Producer: Edward Douglas

Cat Power chronology
Dear Sir (1995)	Myra Lee (1996)	What Would the Community Think (1996)

Myra Lee is the second studio album by Cat Power, the stage name and eponymous band of American singer-songwriter Chan Marshall. It was released in 1996 on the Smells Like Records label. The album was named after Marshall's mother.

== Recording ==
The album was recorded during the same sessions in which Marshall recorded her previous release, Dear Sir (1995), at a makeshift studio in New York City with drummer Steve Shelley.

== Reception ==
Professional ratings
Review scores
Source	Rating
AllMusic	4/5 stars
Rolling Stone	link
The Rolling Stone Album Guide	3/5 stars

Heather Phares of AllMusic wrote that the album contains "churning tempos and spiraling guitars [that] convey Chan Marshall's melancholy musical vision, but gentler songs like the trembling cover of Hank Williams' "Still in Love" and originals like "Top Expert" and "Ice Water" are parts of the picture as well, adding warmth and roundness to the album." Alexander Tudor of Drowned in Sound notes that Marshall "surrounds herself with distortion to create a menacing atmosphere."

Rob Sheffield of Rolling Stone awarded the album five out of five stars, writing: "For nearly six minutes on ["Not What You Want"], Marshall strums her guitar and wails the title phrase over and over, wistfully at first, and then desperately; by the end, she's moaning and screaming and banging her head against the wall. It's nails-on-a-chalkboard for nonfans, a sublime moment of hag-rock transcendence for true devotees, and Cat Power's entire career in a nutshell." Biographer Elizabeth Goodman wrote that the album "sounds as if it was written and recorded by moonlight on a rickety old porch in the Deep South during a dark night of the soul."

== Track listing ==
All tracks are written by Chan Marshall, except where noted.

No.	Title	Writer(s)	Length
1.	"Enough"		5:42
2.	"We All Die"		5:01
3.	"Great Expectations"		4:19
4.	"Top Expert"		3:18
5.	"Ice Water"		3:39
6.	"Still in Love"	Hank Williams	3:29
7.	"Rockets"		4:42
8.	"Faces"		4:59
9.	"Fiancé"		0:31
10.	"Wealthy Man"		5:08
11.	"Not What You Want"		5:29
Total length:			46:17

== Personnel ==
Musicians

- Chan Marshall – vocals, guitar
- Steve Shelley – drums
- Tim Foljahn – guitar

Technical personnel

- Edward Douglas – engineer, mixing
- Oliver Strauss – digital editing

== Works cited ==
- Goodman, Elizabeth (2009). Cat Power: A Good Woman. Three Rivers Press. ISBN 978-0-307-39636-5.
