= You Are Free =

Studio album by Cat Power
- Released: February 18, 2003
- Genre: Indie rock
- Length: 53:07
- Label: Matador
- Producers: Cat Power; Adam Kasper (engineer only)

Cat Power chronology
The Covers Record (2000)	You Are Free (2003)	The Greatest (2006)

You Are Free is the sixth studio album by Cat Power, the stage name and eponymous band of the American singer-songwriter Chan Marshall. It was released in 2003 on Matador Records. The album features guest appearances by Dave Grohl of Foo Fighters, Eddie Vedder of Pearl Jam and Warren Ellis of the Dirty Three.

== Recording ==
You Are Free was recorded over the course of a year, the longest Marshall had spent recording an album at that point. Marshall and engineer Adam Kasper recorded about 40 songs during these sessions.

In a 2003 interview with Pitchfork, Marshall explained the album was recorded "Sporadically. While I was traveling...Adam was working on other things, and I worked on his schedule. He'd get these really nice studios, and when he had off time we'd go in and then try to remember what we did like two months ago and pull that tape up. I'd be like, 'Uh, no, I wanna do something new,' and then I'd write a new song. So it basically worked like that-- every few months getting together and essentially writing new songs." According to Marshall, Kasper helped her decide which of the 40 songs they recorded should make it onto the album.

Marshall revealed that she chose Kasper because "I was looking for somebody who would let me do what I wanted to do, who's a really good engineer," and said that she saw him as an engineer, rather than a producer.

Numerous songs on the album are performed solo, with only Marshall on vocals and guitar or piano. Dave Grohl plays drums on the songs "Speak For Me," "He War" and "Shaking Paper," and plays bass on "Shaking Paper." Eddie Vedder provides backing vocals on "Good Woman" and "Evolution," while Warren Ellis plays violin on "Good Woman."

The songs "Good Woman" and "Werewolf" feature string arrangements by David Campbell, which were recorded after Marshall's vocals had been completed, at the Boat Studio in Los Angeles, California.

== Reception ==
Professional ratings
Aggregate scores
Source	Rating
Metacritic	82/100
Review scores
Source	Rating
AllMusic	4.5/5 stars
Chicago Sun-Times	3/4 stars
Entertainment Weekly	B+
Mojo	3/5 stars
NME	8/10
Pitchfork	8.9/10
Rolling Stone	4/5 stars
The Rolling Stone Album Guide	4/5 stars
Spin	8/10
Uncut	4/5 stars

You Are Free, Marshall's first album of original material since the critically acclaimed Moon Pix (1998), has received widespread critical acclaim since its release. At Metacritic, which assigns a normalized rating out of 100 to reviews from mainstream critics, the album received an average score of 82, based on 26 reviews, which indicates "universal acclaim".

Kelefa Sanneh of Rolling Stone wrote that "Free may be her most beautiful album, as well as her cagiest: There are gaunt rock songs and ramshackle ballads, all painted with bold, sure strokes that belie her ambivalence." Heather Phares of AllMusic wrote that "You Are Free may take awhile longer than expected to unfold, but once it does, its excellence is undeniable." Chris Ott of Pitchfork called it an album "full of arresting, serene beauty...Sans a handful of lesser inclusions and tributes, the imaginary, shorter version of You Are Free is flawless."

In 2009, Pitchfork placed the album at number 98 on their "The Top 200 Albums of the 2000s" list.

"Werewolf" is on the soundtrack of Pedro Almodóvar's 2009 film Broken Embraces.

== Commercial performance ==
You Are Free became Cat Power's first album to chart on the Billboard 200, reaching number 105. The album also debuted at number one 1 on Billboard's Heatseekers Albums Chart. As of 2007, You Are Free has sold over 163,000 copies in the United States, according to Nielsen SoundScan. The song "He War" was released as a single, and a music video for the song directed by Brett Vapnek was released.

== Track listing ==
All tracks are written by Chan Marshall, except where noted.

No.	Title	Writer(s)	Length
1.	"I Don't Blame You"		3:05
2.	"Free"		3:34
3.	"Good Woman"		3:58
4.	"Speak for Me"		3:04
5.	"Werewolf"	Michael Hurley	4:08
6.	"Fool"		3:49
7.	"He War"		3:31
8.	"Shaking Paper"		4:36
9.	"Babydoll"		2:56
10.	"Maybe Not"		4:19
11.	"Names"		4:50
12.	"Half of You"		2:42
13.	"Keep on Runnin'"	John Lee Hooker	3:51
14.	"Evolution"		4:44
Total length:			53:07

Japanese bonus track
No.	Title	Length
15.	"The Party"	2:49
Total length:		55:56

== Personnel ==
- Chan Marshall – vocals, guitars, piano
- Warren Ellis – violin on "Good Woman"
- Dave Grohl – bass on "Speak For Me", drums on "Speak For Me", "He War" and "Shaking Paper"
- Eddie Vedder – vocals on "Good Woman" and "Evolution"
- David Campbell – string arrangement on "Good Woman" and "Werewolf"
- Maggie & Emma – vocals on "Good Woman"

Technical

- Adam Kasper – recording, mixing
- Rick Fisher – mastering
- Mark Borthwick – photography

== Charts ==
Chart (2003)	Peak position
Australian Albums (ARIA)	71
French Albums (SNEP)	67
UK Albums (Official Charts)	157
UK Independent Albums (Official Charts)	22
US Billboard 200	105
US Independent Albums (Billboard)	2
US Heatseekers Albums (Billboard)	1
