= Moon Pix =

Studio album by Cat Power
- Released: September 22, 1998
- Recorded: November 7, 1996; January 1998
- Studio: Sing Sing Studio in Melbourne, Victoria, Australia
- Genre: Indie rock; slowcore
- Length: 46:19
- Label: Matador
- Producer: Matt Voigt

Cat Power chronology
What Would the Community Think (1996)	Moon Pix (1998)	The Covers Record (2000)

Moon Pix is the fourth studio album by Cat Power, the stage name and eponymous band of American singer-songwriter, Chan Marshall. It was released in September 1998 on Matador Records.

Much of the album was written in a single night, following a hallucinatory nightmare Marshall experienced while staying at a farmhouse in South Carolina. Prior to that, Marshall had intended to retire from music. The album was recorded in Melbourne, Australia with Mick Turner and Jim White, of the Australian instrumental band Dirty Three, on guitar and drums, respectively.

Released to modest acclaim, the album has since been described as Cat Power's "magnum opus" and "one of the Nineties great singer/songwriter triumphs." In 2022, it was ranked at number 66 in Pitchfork's "The 150 Best Albums of the 1990s" list.

== Composition ==
Several songs on Moon Pix— "No Sense," "Say," "Metal Heart," "You May Know Him" and "Cross Bones Style"— were written "in one deranged night," following a hallucinatory nightmare Marshall had in the fall of 1997, while alone in the South Carolina farmhouse she shared with her then-boyfriend, Bill Callahan. "I got woken up by someone in the field behind my house in South Carolina," she explained. "The earth started shaking, and dark spirits were smashing up against every window of my house. I woke up and I had my kitten next to me...and I started praying to God to help me...So I just ran and got my guitar because I was trying to distract myself. I had to turn on the lights and sing to God. I got a tape recorder and recorded the next sixty minutes. And I played these long changes, into six different songs. That's where I got the record."

In a 2013 interview with Rob Hughes of The Daily Telegraph, Marshall again recounted the experience:

"I was by myself for three months in the country, surrounded by fields. One morning I had a vision, woke up and could feel something beyond the trees outside my window. Then I heard a voice: ‘Chan, come and meet me outside and all the past will be forgotten.’ I remember sitting up in bed and saying ‘No!’ And when I said that, I felt as if something was coming fast, straight from under the earth, these dark spirits. I know that sounds completely insane. So I sprung out of bed and rushed into every room [mimes shutting windows in a panic]. Then they came, thousands of them, all up against the kitchen window. They were clear, black as night, trying to get into my soul. That’s when I grabbed my acoustic guitar. I thought that if people found my body, I needed to leave a tape. So I just played the songs that became Moon Pix. It was horrifying.”

About two days before Marshall's nightmare, she had received a call from a friend who had challenged her to record something new. "He was like, 'Dude, what are you doing? You're fucking up. You could be really doing something, and you're just not putting anything in the universe, you're just a loser,'" Marshall recalled, in a 2012 interview with Caroline McCloskey of The Fader. "I was so pissed off." After the nightmare, Marshall went to New York City unsuccessfully seeking help, which included talking to priests. The afternoon that Marshall returned from New York, she received a call that her friend had died. Later that night, she heard that another friend of hers had died the same day. "So that's when I woke up," Marshall recalled. "I was like, you know what? What am I doing?" With the cassette of the songs recorded the night of her episode still in her possession, Marshall decided to fax Turner and White, whose band the Dirty Three she had played shows with, and asked if they wanted to record. She asked her record label, Matador, for money to travel to Australia, and spent three months there "hanging out and having a great time" until being told by White that Turner would be leaving Australia in two days, at which point they entered the studio to record the album.

"Stepping into Australia was stepping into something more positive and triumphant as a young woman," Marshall explained in a 2018 Guardian article. "I was, on purpose, choosing a path out of solitude. I found joy I had never felt; some part of the freedom I got there."

According to Marshall, some of Moon Pix was also inspired by two months she spent alone in South Africa, Mozambique and Tanzania, an experience that she said "dented" her. "Cross Bones Style" was written about two children she met in Africa who slept in trees at night after their parents were killed.

The song "Colors and the Kids" was written in the studio, and the lyric "Yellow hair, you are such a funny bear" refers to several people, including Marshall's nephew, a former bandmate, and American singer/songwriter Will Oldham, with whom Marshall drank in Australia, and who she says reminded her of the South.

== Recording ==
The majority of Moon Pix was recorded at Sing Sing Studio in Melbourne, Australia by house engineer Matt Voigt. In a 2006 interview with Mess+Noise, Voigt revealed that work on the album started the day after New Year's in 1998, with Marshall arriving with her guitar and asking Voigt how he wanted to set up for recording. Most of the songs were recorded with Marshall singing and playing guitar at the same time, with Marshall and a microphone in one room and a small guitar amplifier in another.

The album's opener, "American Flag," features a slowed-down reversed drum sample from the 1986 Beastie Boys song, "Paul Revere." According to Voigt, Marshall appeared with a copy of the song on album in her bag, and requested a "backwards drum beat," which Marshall then recorded on top of. The sample is uncredited on Moon Pix.

Voigt recalls that Marshall was "a lovely lady. Very emotional. We would do takes and she'd just start crying in the middle of a take. And she'd say 'Stop, stop, I'm sorry, I'm sorry' and I'm like "'It sounded great!'"

According to Voigt, the Dirty Three members joined the studio most likely on the second day. White played drums over vocals and guitar already recorded by Marshall, while all three musicians recorded two songs live with bassist Andrew Entsch on double bass.

In a 1998 interview with Marcus Maida for Hotel Discipline, Marshall recalled that Turner was late to the studio, which led to "American Flag" being worked on for an estimated five hours, becoming by default the album's most "produced" song. Upon Turner's arrival, the band recorded "Metal Heart," "Moonshiner," "Say" and "No Sense," after which Turner left. They were soon joined by Belinda Woods, who added flute to "He Turns Down." Marshall recalled encouraging Woods, who had never heard her music, to stop "holding back" after hearing her initial attempts, after which she delivered the master performance in a single take. "She was fucking great," Marshall remembered, "she was so amazing."

The thunder samples on "Say" were Marshall's idea, and taken from one of the studio's sample library CD. As Voight recounted, "we laid some thunder all over the song and then mixed in the bits that we thought were appropriate."

The album's only piano-driven song, "Colors and the Kids," was recorded spontaneously near the end of the session. As with most of the other songs, Marshall and her instrument were recorded live.

"Peking Saint" and "You May Know Him" were recorded by Turner at Scuzz Studios. "Back of your Head" was recorded for the VPRO Radio 5 show, De Avonden.

== Album cover ==
The album cover of Moon Pix was taken by American photographer Roe Ethridge at his apartment in Williamsburg, Brooklyn. According to the 33 1/3 entry on Moon Pix by Donna Kozloskie, Marshall called Ethridge, who had been a friend of hers when they both lived in Atlanta, in September or October 1998 and suggested they "take a picture," potentially for the album cover. Ethridge shot Marshall with a Polaroid Type 64. Marshall wore a slightly oversized denim jacket from a pile of clothes in Ethridge's apartment, and posed under fake silk magnolias Ethridge had brought from a trip to Georgia.

As Marshall later recalled, "I remember being so happy to be with [Ethridge]. That connection with Atlanta, and he was sweet and funny. I remember feeling safe. He took one picture and I almost blacked out. Not black, though, nothing but light. I had some mystical experiences around this time. I lay down in the floor and couldn't see. We looked at the pictures and that was it. That was the cover."

== Release ==
No singles were released for Moon Pix, although a music video directed by Brett Vapnek was released for "Cross Bones Style."

As of 2003, the album has sold 63,000 copies in the United States alone, according to Nielsen SoundScan.

== Reception ==
Professional ratings
Review scores
Source	Rating
AllMusic	4.5/5 stars
The Encyclopedia of Popular Music	4/5 stars
Houston Chronicle	4/5 stars
The List	4/5 stars
NME	8/10
Pitchfork	7.4/10 (1998); 9.5/10 (2019)
The Rolling Stone Album Guide	4.5/5 stars
Spin	5/5 stars
The Village Voice	C+

Reviewing the album for NME, Stuart Bailey wrote that "Cat Power... walks a dazzling line between Sonic Youth and Hank Williams, and that on Moon Pix, "she sounds like the oldest person alive; copping lines from the hymn ‘Amazing Grace’ on the ferocious ‘Metal Heart’ or getting in character for ‘Moonshiner’, a tune that she learnt off a Dylan bootleg and that's imbued with the lonesome spirit of Will Oldham. Robert Christgau of The Village Voice gave it a rating of "C+," calling Marshall "an honest heroine of the new indie staple" which was based on "slow sadness about one's inability to relate." Also writing for The Village Voice, Jane Dark wrote that Moon Pix was "supposed to mesmerize and haunt. But if you stare too long it can start to seem vacant."

Pitchfork's Ryan Schreiber gave the album a rating of 7.4, and wrote that it "spins through 11 tracks of soft strumming and brittle vocals, all while you rest your head on your pillow, watching a muted black-and-white television, and drifting in and out of consciousness. Not that Moon Pix makes great sleeping music. Quite the contrary, actually-- it's way too interesting." Gail O'Hara of Time Out New York described Moon Pix as "the record Marshall's admirers knew she had in her," and wrote that "what makes this album so dazzling is the focus of Marshall's melancholic songwriting and her gripping vocals that flutter, whisper and even howl." Jonathan Trew of The List wrote that "Marshall's voice seems to come from some other dimension, it hangs and it haunts, inhabiting an oft sparse terrain of faintly country-ish hue," and declared that the album was "odd but well worth investigating."

=== Legacy ===
Moon Pix has retrospectively been praised as a key album of 1990s indie rock, and cited as evidence of Marshall's maturation as a songwriter. In a four-and-a-half star review, Heather Phares of AllMusic wrote that it "continues Chan Marshall's transformation from an indie rock Cassandra into a reflective, accomplished singer/songwriter." Rob Sheffield awarded the album five stars in The Rolling Stone Album Guide, and called it "even stronger" than her previous album, What Would the Community Think.

Lisa Lagace of NPR called Moon Pix "a note-perfect album that turns inward, filled with songs that express what it means to be deeply, inexplicably melancholy," and wrote that "it will continue to work its magic, healing metal hearts, for generations to come."

In 2018, Pitchfork ranked Moon Pix at number six on its list of "The 50 Best Albums of 1998," with Matthew Schnipper calling it "as powerful as indie gets, bar none." The same year, Scott Wallace of The Sydney Scoop noted that "Moon Pix only registered as a minor breakthrough on its release in 1998," but "perhaps because it remained unhobbled by praise and expectation, Moon Pix grew in stature in the ensuing twenty years."

Looking back at the album in May 2018, Marshall told The Guardian, "It makes me feel good and very humbled, how many people have told me Moon Pix was important to them for personal reasons. It's beautiful...To me Moon Pix was just so elementary in its simplicity. I never really felt it was that good but people say, 'It's your best record.'" Marshall revealed that "it feels like I'm alive today because of being able to write those songs. Instead of darkness, instead of other choices humans make, I chose to write songs. Moon Pix was my salvation as a very mixed-up young person. And suddenly I see that."

In 2019, Pitchfork updated the album's score to 9.5 with a new review by Jayson Greene, who wrote that "sometimes an artist makes something dangerously potent, a piece of work with a mood so thick that it demands an explanation. Moon Pix is undoubtedly that album for Cat Power." In 2022, the website ranked Moon Pix at number 66 in their list of "The 150 Best Albums of the 1990s", comparing its sound to "a summer thunderstorm in the middle of nowhere". It was the album's first appearance on any of Pitchfork's "best of" lists for the decade.

The album is referenced in Jeffrey Brown's 2005 graphic novel, Aeiou: An Easy Intimacy, as part of the 'Soundtrack Side A'.

The album's cover was reenacted by the Shins on their 2001 music video for "New Slang," along with album covers by Hüsker Dü, the Replacements, the Minutemen, Squirrel Bait, Sonic Youth and Slint.

=== 20th anniversary ===
On May 31, 2018, Marshall reunited with Turner, White and Woods to perform a show celebrating the album's 20th anniversary, as part of Vivid LIVE 2018, at the Sydney Opera House in Sydney, Australia. The performance, described by Vice as "damn-near flawless," featured the band performing the album in full, along with later material such as "I Don't Blame You" and "The Greatest." Marshall received a standing ovation at the end of the performance.

The show also featured a small string section arranged by Australian musician Ned Collette.

=== Accolades ===
Publication	Country	Accolade	Year	Rank
Pitchfork	US	The 50 Best Albums of 1998	2018	6
Pitchfork	US	The 150 Best Albums of the 1990s	2022	66

== Track listing ==
All tracks are written by Chan Marshall, unless noted.

No.	Title	Writer(s)	Length
1.	"American Flag"		3:30
2.	"He Turns Down"		5:39
3.	"No Sense"		4:50
4.	"Say"		3:24
5.	"Metal Heart"		4:02
6.	"Back of Your Head"		3:43
7.	"Moonshiner"	Traditional	4:50
8.	"You May Know Him"		2:46
9.	"Colors and the Kids"		6:35
10.	"Cross Bones Style"		4:32
11.	"Peking Saint"		2:28
Total length:			46:19

== Personnel ==
- Chan Marshall – vocals, guitar, piano
- Mick Turner – guitar, engineer
- Belinda Woods – flute
- Jim White – drums
- Andrew Entsch – bass

Technical

- Matt Voigt – engineer
- Roe Ethridge – photography
