= The Greatest (Cat Power album) =

- Standard cover. Slipcover editions feature a picture of Marshall on each one.

Studio album by Cat Power
- Released: January 20, 2006
- Recorded: May 2005
- Studio: Ardent Studios, Memphis
- Genres: Indie rock; soul; country
- Length: 44:34
- Label: Matador
- Producer: Stuart Sikes

Cat Power chronology
You Are Free (2003)	The Greatest (2006)	Jukebox (2008)

Singles from The Greatest
- 1. "Lived in Bars" Released: 2006; 2. "Could We" Released: 2006

The Greatest is the seventh studio album by Cat Power, the stage name and eponymous band of American singer-songwriter Chan Marshall. All tracks on the album were written by Marshall, making it her first album not to include any cover songs. The Memphis Rhythm Band includes Roy Brewer, Teenie Hodges, Steve Potts, Dave Smith, Rick Steff, Doug Easley, Jim Spake, Scott Thompson and Susan Marshall. String arrangements were contributed by Harlan T. Bobo and Jonathan Kirkscey.

The Greatest debuted at #34 on the Billboard 200, her highest-charting album at the time. It also won the 2006 Shortlist Music Prize, making Marshall the first woman to win the honor. It was also named the 6th best album of 2006 by Rolling Stone, as well as the 26th best album of the decade.

== Critical reception ==
Professional ratings
Aggregate scores
Source	Rating
Metacritic	80/100
Review scores
Source	Rating
AllMusic	4/5 stars
The A.V. Club	A−
Entertainment Weekly	B+
The Guardian	4/5 stars
Los Angeles Times	3.5/4 stars
NME	8/10
Pitchfork	7.9/10
Q	4/5 stars
Rolling Stone	3.5/5 stars
Spin	A

The Greatest has received a very positive response since its release. At Metacritic, which assigns a normalized rating out of 100 to reviews from mainstream critics, the album received an average score of 80, based on 35 reviews, which indicates "generally favorable reviews".

Rhapsody ranked the album #6 on its "Alt/Indie’s Best Albums of the Decade" list. "The mercurial Chan Marshall returned to her Southern roots and recorded this blissful album in Memphis. The Greatest glows with a new ease, and the music itself -- which features many of the greatest soul musicians in history -- is sunny and open. There's a sense of joy coming through here that you'll want to share with friends."

== Track listing ==
All tracks are written by Chan Marshall.

No.	Title	Length
1.	"The Greatest"	3:22
2.	"Living Proof"	3:11
3.	"Lived in Bars"	3:44
4.	"Could We"	2:21
5.	"Empty Shell"	3:04
6.	"Willie"	5:57
7.	"Where Is My Love"	2:53
8.	"The Moon"	3:45
9.	"Islands"	1:44
10.	"After It All"	3:31
11.	"Hate"	3:38
12.	"Love & Communication"	4:34

Limited edition
No.	Title	Length
13.	"Up and Gone"	2:15

Japanese bonus track
No.	Title	Length
13.	"Dreams" (Felice & Boudleaux Bryant's "All I Have to Do Is Dream")	2:46

== Personnel ==
- Chan Marshall – vocals, piano, guitar
- Mabon "Teenie" Hodges – guitar on all songs except "Hate"
- Leroy Hodges – bass (on tracks: 1, 3, 8, 12)
- David Smith – bass (on tracks: 2, 4–6, 9, 10)
- Steve Potts – drums
- Doug Easley – guitar, pedal steel
- Rick Steff – keyboards, clavitone, piano, organ
- Jim Spake – saxophone
- Scott Thompson – trumpet
- Roy Brewer – violin
- Johnathan Kirkscey – cello
- Beth Luscone – viola

== Commercial performance ==
The album debuted at number 34 on the U.S. Billboard 200 chart, selling about 23,000 copies in its first week. As of 2009, the album has tallied 125,000 copies in the United States alone, according to Nielsen SoundScan. It was awarded a gold certification from the Independent Music Companies Association, which indicated sales of at least 100,000 copies throughout Europe.

== Charts ==
Chart	Peak position
Australian Albums (ARIA)	25
Belgian Albums (Ultratop Flanders)	25
Belgian Albums (Ultratop Wallonia)	56
French Albums (SNEP)	20
German Albums (Offizielle Top 100)	72
Irish Albums (IRMA)	44
Italian Albums (FIMI)	43
Norwegian Albums (VG-lista)	35
Scottish Albums (Official Charts)	36
Swiss Albums (Schweizer Hitparade)	57
Swedish Albums (Sverigetopplistan)	50
UK Albums (Official Charts)	45
UK Independent Albums (Official Charts)	6
US Billboard 200	34

== Certifications and sales ==
Region	Certification	Certified units/sales
United Kingdom (BPI)	Silver	60,000^{‡}
United States	—	125,000
Summaries
Europe	—	100,000
^{‡} Sales+streaming figures based on certification alone.
