= Telluric Chaos =

Live album by Iggy Pop & The Stooges
- Released: May 3, 2005
- Recorded: March 22, 2004
- Genres: Hard rock, punk rock
- Length: 79:21
- Label: Skydog Records
- Producer: No producer credit given

Iggy Pop & The Stooges chronology
Live in Detroit (2004)	Telluric Chaos (2005)	The Weirdness (2007)

Professional ratings
Review scores
Source	Rating
Allmusic	4/5 stars

Telluric Chaos is a live album by the reunited Iggy Pop & The Stooges. It chronicles the closing date of the band's first ever Japanese tour, which took place on March 22, 2004, at the Shibuya AX in Tokyo. The album documents a typical reunited Stooges set, primarily drawn from the band's first two albums (including all of Fun House) with no material from the James Williamson era (Raw Power, Kill City). This live set also includes some of the first live performances of three of the four Stooges reunion tracks from Iggy Pop's 2003 solo album Skull Ring plus one brand new song, "My Idea of Fun" (a finalized version appears on their 2007 studio album The Weirdness).

Originally a CD-only release, the album was issued on vinyl in 2006 by French label May I Records (under license from Skydog) and in 2016 with a limited colored vinyl edition for Record Store Day's Black Friday.

== Track listing ==
All songs written by Iggy Pop, Ron Asheton, Dave Alexander and Scott Asheton except as noted.

1. "Loose" – 3:56
2. "Down on the Street" – 4:23
3. "1969" – 3:40
4. "I Wanna Be Your Dog" – 5:37
5. "TV Eye" – 5:11
6. "Dirt" – 3:52
7. "Real Cool Time" – 3:08
8. "No Fun" – 4:12
9. "1970" (Pop, R. Asheton, Alexander, S. Asheton, Steve Mackay) – 6:14
10. "Fun House / L.A. Blues" (Pop, R. Asheton, Alexander, S. Asheton, Mackay) – 7:19
11. "Skull Ring" (Pop, R. Asheton, S. Asheton) – 5:07
12. "Dead Rock Star" (Pop, R. Asheton, S. Asheton) – 4:18
13. "Little Electric Chair" (Pop, R. Asheton, S. Asheton) – 5:16
14. "Little Doll" – 5:07
15. "My Idea of Fun" (Pop, R. Asheton, S. Asheton) – 5:04
16. "I Wanna Be Your Dog" (version two) – 3:50
17. "Not Right" – 3:07

== Personnel ==
The Stooges (remaining 1969/1970 line-up):

- Iggy Pop - vocals
- Ron Asheton - electric guitar
- Scott Asheton - drums
- Steve Mackay - saxophone

with

- Mike Watt - bass guitar
