= Gregg Foreman =

American musician and DJ (1972–2026)

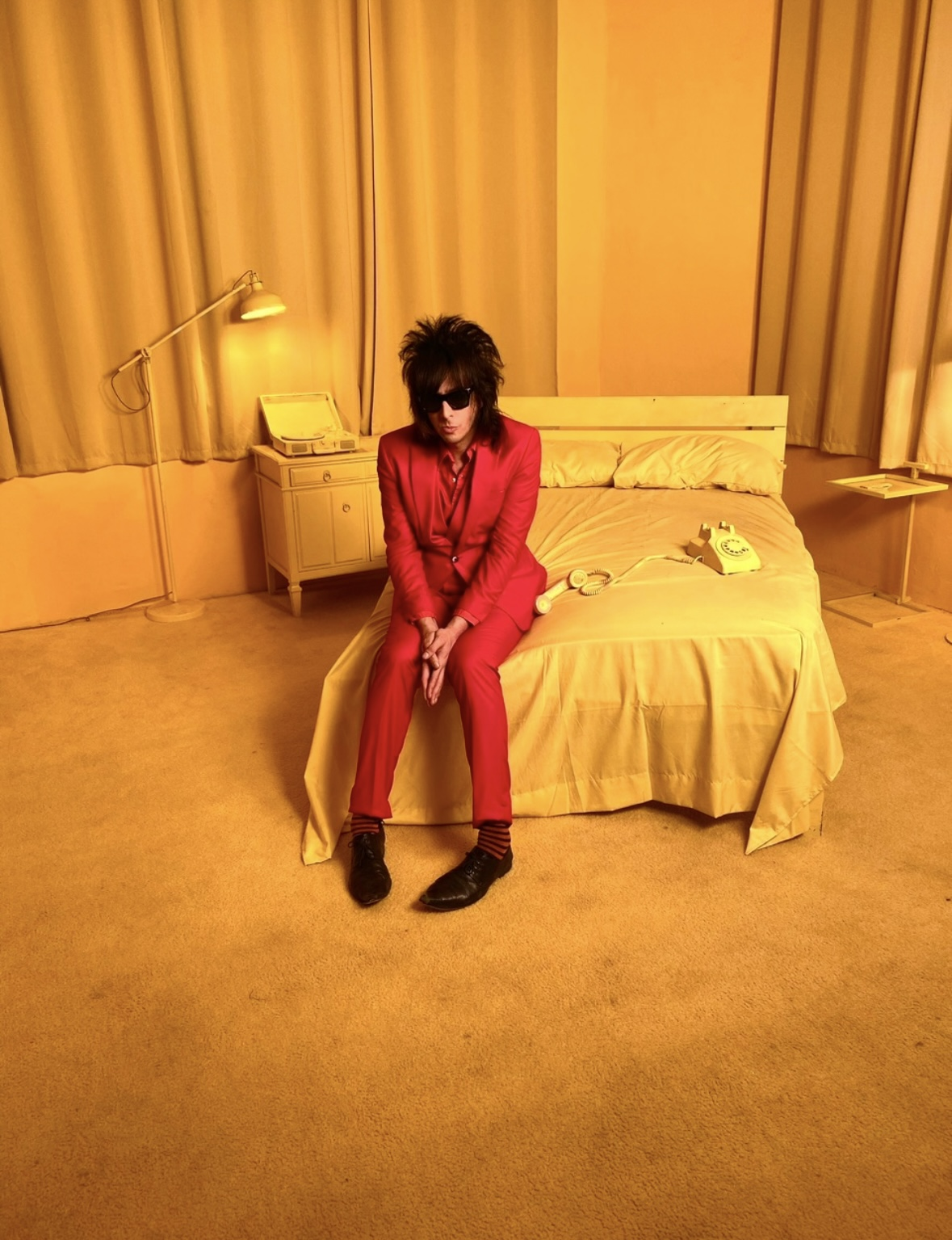

Background information
- Born: October 5, 1972; Philadelphia, Pennsylvania, U.S.
- Died: April 21, 2026 (aged 53) Los Angeles, California, U.S.
- Genres: Post-punk; garage; soul; synth
- Occupations: Musician; DJ
- Years active: 1989–2026
- Formerly of: The Delta 72, Cat Power, Pink Mountaintops, The Gossip

Gregg Foreman (October 5, 1972 – April 21, 2026) was an American musician and DJ born in Philadelphia. Foreman gained recognition initially as the front man of The Delta 72, a band that created a frenetic and honest style channeling post-punk rock sensibilities with 1960s British Invasion R&B. The live gigs of The Delta 72 have been characterized by Gregg's energetic stage performances and James Brown-like moves.

== Early life and education ==
Gregg Foreman was born in Philadelphia on October 5, 1972. He had one sister, Abbe Foreman, a photographer in Philadelphia. His mother, Vicki Foreman was a school teacher. Foreman was raised in Valley Forge, Pennsylvania, and attended Conestoga High School.

== Career ==
Foreman began playing music in his hometown of Philadelphia. When he was 13 he bought his first synthesizer, a Roland Alpha Juno, and a Yamaha drum machine. Foreman spent time in the Philadelphia post-punk/goth music scene, playing in bands and hosting a cable-access music and culture show.

After high school, Foreman joined a post-hardcore band called Junction, with whom he toured and made records. Within a few years and inspired by Washington, D.C. bands like Fugazi, Foreman started the post-punk/soul/no wave band the Delta 72. The band toured and released records on Dischord Records, Kill Rock Stars and eventually Touch and Go Records. They worked with Brendan Canty, Eli Janney, Steve Albini, Royal Trux and Shelly Yakus, before disbanding in 2001. In the interim, Foreman played on records including Acme by the Jon Spencer Blues Explosion.

By the mid 1990s, Foreman started freelance writing for the Philadelphia City Paper, interviewing musicians such as Ian McLagan of Small Faces and Bobby Byrd of the James Brown band. At this time, Foreman became obsessed with 45 rpm records, starting a mod/soul night in Philadelphia called "The Turnaround", which became part of the nightclub Making Time. The Turnaround inspired Foreman to DJ in Philadelphia and around the world, doing so at venues including David Lynch's Silencio, Parisian venue Le Baron, and Tokyo's Beat Cafe. Foreman's sets included music from mod, soul, post-punk, girl group, cold wave, and 1960s psychedelic and garage genres.

He joined Cat Power in 2006, and eventually became musical director. He was also in Canadian band Pink Mountaintops, psychedelic post-punk band the Meek, and was a part-time member of the psyche rock band the Black Ryder.

In 2015, Foreman worked on Re-Licked, a project of James Williamson of the Stooges, including Alison Mosshart from the Kills, Bobby Gillespie of Primal Scream, Jello Biafra from the Dead Kennedys and Mark Lanegan.

Foreman also hosted The Pharmacy, a radio show focusing on the architects of underground music, interviewing artists like Alan Vega of Suicide, Anton Newcombe of The Brian Jonestown Massacre, Genesis P-Orridge from Psychic TV; and pioneer of no wave, Lydia Lunch.

In 2019, Foreman released an EP with Vega, featuring mixes by drummer Jim Sclavunos and composer JG Thirlwell, and musical contributions from Yeah Yeah Yeahs guitarist Nick Zinner and White Hills.

In 2019, Foreman joined American post-punk band the Gossip for a European tour which included an appearance at Madrid's Mad Cool festival.

In 2020, Foreman began working with Kat Von D on her debut LP Love Made Me Do It and its 2024 follow-up My Side of the Mountain.

In his later career, Foreman had been producing live scores to underground, strange art and obscure films at the Philosophical Research Society, working with artists like Death Valley Girls, Martin Rev, David J, Eugene Hütz and Paris Jackson.

Foreman was found dead at his home in Los Angeles, California, on April 21, 2026, at the age of 53.
