= Raw Power Live: In the Hands of the Fans =

Live album by The Stooges
- Released: April 16, 2011
- Recorded: September 3, 2010
- Venues: Kutshers Country Club, Monticello, New York.
- Genres: Hard rock, garage rock, punk rock
- Label: Virgin

The Stooges chronology
| Have Some Fun: Live at Ungano's (2010) | Raw Power Live: In the Hands of the Fans (2011) | Ready to Die (2013) |

Raw Power Live: In the Hands of the Fans is the final live album by Iggy & The Stooges recorded at All Tomorrow's Parties Festival on Friday, September 3, 2010 at Kutshers Country Club, Monticello, NY. It was released to coincide with Record Store Day, April 16, 2011, on 180 gram vinyl. The album was later released on iTunes.

== Track listing ==
1. "Raw Power"
2. "Search and Destroy"
3. "Gimme Danger"
4. "Your Pretty Face Is Going to Hell"
5. "Shake Appeal"
6. "I Need Somebody"
7. "Penetration"
8. "Death Trip"
9. "I Got a Right"

== Personnel ==
- Iggy Pop – vocals
- James Williamson – guitar
- Mike Watt – bass guitar
- Scott Asheton – drums
- Steve Mackay – saxophone
