= Re-Licked =

Studio album by James Williamson
- Released: October 16, 2014
- Label: Leopard Lady Records
- Producer: James Williamson

James Williamson chronology
Kill City (1977)	Re-Licked (2014)

Professional ratings
Review scores
Source	Rating
AllMusic	3/5 stars
I-94 Bar	6/6 stars
100 Percent Rock Magazine	9.5/10 stars

Re-Licked is the first solo album by the guitarist, songwriter, record producer and Rock and Roll Hall of Fame inductee James Williamson released in October 2014. It features tracks originally performed and demoed between 1973 and 1975 during Williamson's first tenure with Iggy and the Stooges.

The album's featured tracks were mainly composed in the period following the release of 1973's Raw Power and before Iggy and the Stooges disbanded. The songs have long appeared on live bootlegs and unofficial releases but were not officially recorded because the band did not have a record deal at the time.

All the songs were recorded by Williamson with the members of the live touring version of The Stooges at Dave Grohl's 606 Studios. Iggy Pop did not take part in the recordings. Instead, the album features a number of guest vocalists including Jello Biafra, Alison Mosshart, Carolyn Wonderland and Bobby Gillespie. The entire album was streamed by Rolling Stone just prior to its official release.

== Track listing ==
1. "Head on Curve" vocals: Jello Biafra
2. "Open Up and Bleed" vocals: Carolyn Wonderland
3. "Scene of the Crime" vocals: Bobby Gillespie
4. "She Creatures Of The Hollywood Hills" vocals: Ariel Pink
5. "Til The End of the Night" vocals: Alison Mosshart
6. "I Got a Right" vocals: Lisa Kekaula
7. "Pin Point Eyes" vocals: Joe Cardamone
8. "Wild Love" vocals: Mark Lanegan & Alison Mosshart
9. "Rubber Leg" vocals: Ron Young
10. "I'm Sick of You" vocals: Mario Cuomo

Bonus Tracks

1. "Gimme Some Skin" vocals: Carolyn Wonderland
2. "Cock in My Pocket" vocals: Nicke Andersson
3. "Heavy Liquid" vocals: Lisa Kekaula
4. "Wet My Bed" vocals: The Richmond Sluts
5. "Cock in My Pocket" vocals: Gary Floyd
6. "Rubber Leg" vocals: JG Thirlwell

The CD version was released with a DVD featuring a documentary of the making of the album and promotional videos of "Open Up and Bleed", "Gimme Some Skin" and "I Got a Right".

== Performances ==
In 2015, four tracks from the album were televised nationally on NBC's Last Call with Carson Daly show. The 4th February show saw performances of “Head on Curve” featuring Jello Biafra and “Open Up and Bleed" featuring Carolyn Wonderland. On the 25th February show, Williamson and Alison Mosshart returned and performed "Til The End of the Night". The show also previewed "I Got a Right" featuring Lisa Kekaula on vocals.

With so many vocal collaborators, performance opportunities have been limited and no tour is planned. However, on 16 January 2015, the entire album was performed live in a one-off show at LA's Bootleg HiFi Theater, with a silent Williamson giving free rein to each artist to perform the songs in their own way. The entire concert film was globally premiered on Yahoo music on the 7th of April 2015.

== Main Personnel ==
- James Williamson - guitars
- Mike Watt - bass
- Simone Butler - bass, backing vocals
- Toby Dammit - drums
- Gregg Foreman - keyboards
- Steve Mackay - saxophone
- Walter Daniels - harmonica on "Gimme Some Skin"
