= Bubblegum Screw =

- Origin: London, England, UK
- Genres: Punk rock Glam rock
- Years active: 2006–2016
- Members: Mark Thorn; Jonathan Gaglione; Miguel Martins; Mark Bishop
- Past members: Mike Fury; Jonni Scarlett; Dave666; TommyVommit; Rich van Kerr; Zuri Warsaw; Zach Rembrandt; Sebastien Frey; Ken Nomoto
- Website: ,

Bubblegum Screw was a London glam punk band heavily influenced by New York City 1977 punk and other American bands such as New York Dolls, The Dead Boys and The Stooges. Along with bands such as Backyard Babies and Buckcherry, they were called the new blood of glam punk. They were also mentioned in the introduction to Brett Callwood's biography of The Stooges.

== Characteristics ==
Formed in 2006 by Mark Thorn, the former vocalist for Dead Famous, and Zuri Warsaw on bass guitar, the band quickly recruited Dead Famous' old drummer Mike Fury and Rich van Kerr on guitar.

After an initial period with Thorn combining both singing and guitar duties and the recording of the EP 'St Valentine's Day Massacre' in 2007, Jonni Scarlett was recruited to play lead guitar. He was replaced before an Eastern European tour, which included concerts in Zagreb, Belgrade, Sofia and Plovdiv, by Tommy Vommit, the name being given to him by Rich van Kerr after a heavy night of drinking.

In 2008 the song 'Rock 'n' Roll Loser' was featured on the cover CD "Sons of Guns III" for Classic Rock Magazine. During the same period, original drummer Mike Fury left the band and was replaced by Dave666 of B-Movie Vampires fame. They also featured on compilation CDs of the UK fanzine Bubblegum Slut and in 2009 supported L.A. Guns and Warrior Soul on their London dates.

Their debut album 'Screwphoria!' was released in 2011. After several line-up changes, the band released their second album 'Filthy Rich Lolitas' in 2014. Following the departure of Zuri Warsaw in the same year and further line-up changes, the remaining members discontinued Bubblegum Screw and in June 2016 started a new project named Neon Animal.

== Members ==
- Mark Thorn – vocals (2006–2016)
- Jonathan Gaglione – bass/vocals (2014–2016)
- Miguel Martins – guitar/vocals (2015–2016)
- Mark Bishop – drums (2012–2016)

=== Former members ===
- Mike Fury – drums (2006–2008)
- Jonni Scarlett – lead guitar (2007)
- Rich van Kerr – Rhythm Guitar (2006–2010)
- Dave666 – drums (2008–2010)
- TommyVomit – Guitar (2007–2010)
- Zuri Warsaw – bass (2006–2014)
- Zach Rembrandt – guitar/vocals (2010–2014)
- Ken Nomoto – guitar (2010–2014)
- Sebastien Frey-drums (2010–2012)

== Discography ==
=== EPs ===
- St Valentine's Day Massacre (2008)

=== Albums ===
- Screwphoria! (2011)
- Filthy! Rich! Lolitas! (2014)
