= Ready to Die (disambiguation) =

Ready to Die is a 1994 album by The Notorious B.I.G.

Ready to Die may also refer to:

- Ready to Die (The Stooges album), a 2013 album by Iggy and the Stooges
- "Ready to Die", a song by Iggy and the Stooges from the 2013 album Ready to Die
- "Ready to Die," a song by The Notorious B.I.G. from the 1994 album Ready to Die
- "Ready to Die," a song by Andrew W.K. from the 2001 album I Get Wet
- "Ready to Die," a song by the Unicorns from the 2003 album Who Will Cut Our Hair When We're Gone?
