= The Delta 72 =

American alternative music band

- Origin: Washington, D.C., United States
- Genres: Alternative rock, punk blues, garage rock
- Years active: 1994 – 2001
- Label: Touch and Go
- Past members: Gregg Foreman; Mark Boyce; Jason Kourkounis; Bruce Reckahn; Kim Thompson; Sarah Stolfa; Ben Azzara

The Delta 72 were an American alternative music band formed in Washington, D.C. in mid 1994, who later relocated to Philadelphia, Pennsylvania. They created a frenetic and honest style channeling post-punk sensibilities with 1960s British Invasion R&B.

Led by Gregg Foreman, The Delta 72 formed out of a desire to make music that incorporated elements of "everything from weird punk stuff to country". Their early, "bluesy punk" sound was also significantly influenced by Booker T. & the M.G.'s.

The original line-up consisted of just Ben Azzara on drums and Foreman on guitar, harp and vocals. In short succession, friends Sarah Stolfa on Farfisa organ and Kim Thompson of Cupid Car Club on bass guitar were added. After the release of their first single, "On the Rocks", a joint production of Dischord and Kill Rock Stars records, they toured the United States and played regionally around the Northeast.

After Ben Azzara left the group for The Capitol City Dusters, they were signed to Touch and Go Records in 1995. The line-up now consisted of Gregg Foreman on guitar, harp and vocals, Jason Kourkounis (formerly of Mule) on drums, Kim Thompson on bass and vocals, and Sarah Stolfa on Farfisa organ.

Their first Touch and Go release was in 1996 with the "Triple Crown" single and the album The R&B of Membership. Later releases include several singles, an EP, and the full-length CDs The Soul of a New Machine and 000. Their final releases showed the influence of early Sly and the Family Stone, MC5, and Al Green.

Thompson left in 1996, and was replaced by Bruce Reckahn. Stolfa left in 1998 to be replaced by Mark Boyce (Boss Hog). They disbanded in July 2001. Gregg Foreman later played with Cat Power. He died April 21, 2026 in Los Angeles.

== Discography ==
=== Studio albums ===
- The R&B of Membership (1996) Touch and Go Records
- The Soul of a New Machine (1997) Touch & Go
- 000 (2000) Touch & Go

=== Other releases ===
- Self Published (1994) Cassette tapes sold on tour
- "On the Rocks" 7" single (1995) Kill Rock Stars/Dischord
- "Rich Girls..." / "Cinderella" 7" single (1996) Touch & Go
- Sorega Doushita EP (1999) Touch & Go
- "The Doctor Is In" 7” single (2000) Touch & Go
