= The Bellrays =

American rock band

The BellRays
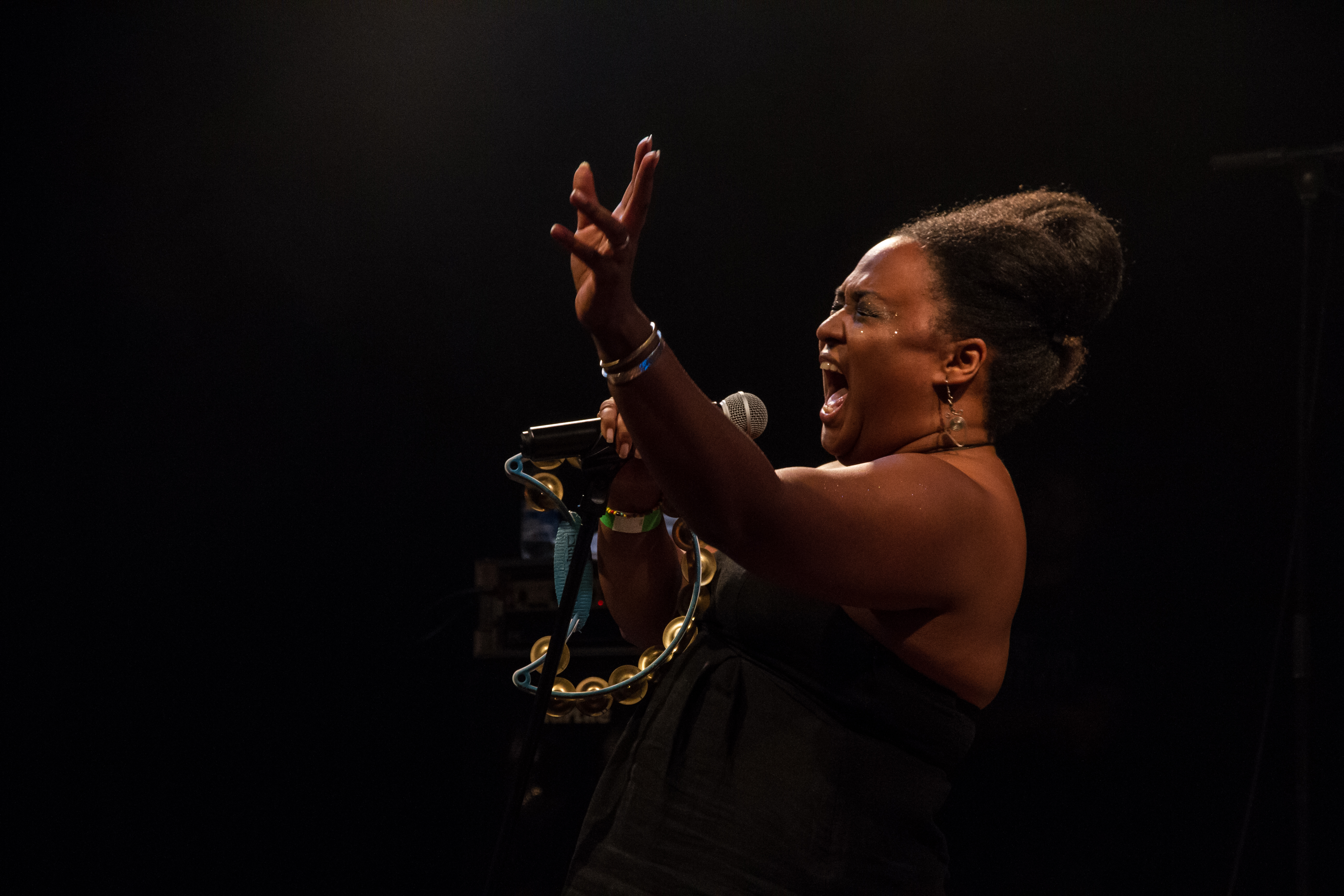
- The BellRays in Duisburg, 2014

Background information
- Origin: Riverside, California, United States
- Genres: Garage rock, soul, punk rock
- Years active: 1990–present
- Labels: You and Media (US); Heart of Gold (ES); Vicious Circle (FR); Shock (AU); Alternative Tentacles (US)
- Members: Lisa Kekaula; Bob Vennum; Stefan Litrownik; Justin Andres
- Past members: Craig Waters; Jim Kerwin; Ray Chin; Tony Fate; Todd Westover; Walter "Phil" Phillips; Michael Sessa; Jeffrey Porterfield; Eric Allgood; Chris Markwood; Brad Vaughn
- Website: http://www.thebellrays.com

The Bellrays (also capitalized as The BellRays) is an American rock group that combines garage rock and punk with soul music, founded in Riverside, California, in 1990 by vocalist Lisa Kekaula and guitarist Bob Vennum. They have been with several independent labels, including Upper Cut, Poptones, Alternative Tentacles, Bittersweet, Shock, Cheap Lullaby, Vicious Circle, Vital Gesture and Anodyne.

== History ==
Kekaula and Vennum founded the BellRays on the dissolution of previous group The Rose Thorns, a group formed by Vennum in 1986, which Kekaula joined in 1988; the band released an album Ralph's Mom & Dad in 1990; songs from the album were later rerecorded by the BellRays. The same year, the BellRays released their self-titled debut, a cassette-only album with Kekaula and Vennum joined by Phil Phillips on bass and Brad Vaughn on drums.

The BellRays released their second album In the Light of the Sun, also cassette-only (until later reissue), in 1993, featuring new drummer Ray Chin and keyboardist Jim Kerwin. Tony Bramel (aka Tony Fate) produced and played bass on the recording and joined the band permanently as guitarist in 1996, with Vennum switching to bass. The following albums, Let It Blast and Grand Fury, were recorded live in the band's rehearsal space.

Fifth album The Red, White & Black (2003) was released on the Poptones label in the UK and Alternative Tentacles in the US. Craig Waters replaced Chin as drummer for the band's next two records—Have a Little Faith and Hard, Sweet and Sticky—the latter featuring Billy Mohler on production and bass guitar, Bob Vennum having switched back to lead guitar with the departure of Tony Fate.

The BellRays' eighth album proper, Black Lightning, was released in 2010, and their most recent album, Punk Funk Rock Soul Volume Two, was released in 2018.

On the group's MySpace page, they described themselves as follows:

"High Octane Rock and Roll! Biography schmiography! Who cares about where they came from or what they did before or how many records they put out. Stats are not what music or this band is about. If you have an open mind and want something challenging in your life then this is where you want to stop and listen. Just take it in and make up your own mind. You want somebody to tell you what it is go to Kelly Clarkson's website instead. You tell us what we're about and then tell your friends whether you like it or not."

"Zero PM" was featured in the video game Driv3r and "Revolution Get Down" in a commercial for the Nissan Xterra. "Revolution Get Down" was also used as a fade-to-commercial song during the 2006 NCAA Tournament in the George Mason-Florida semifinal on CBS Sports.

== Discography ==
=== Albums and EPs ===
- The BellRays (1990)
- In the Light of the Sun (1993; reissued 2002)
- Let It Blast (1998)
- Punk Rock and Soul (1999) [Five tracks; split LP w/Streetwalkin' Cheetahs]
- Grand Fury (2000)
- The Red, White and Black (2004)
- Have A Little Faith (2006)
- Hard Sweet and Sticky (2008)
- Black Lightning (2010)
- Covers (2016) [6-track EP]
- Punk Funk Rock Soul Vol.1 (2017) [Four-track EP]
- Punk Funk Rock Soul Vol.2 (2018)
- Heavy Steady Go! (2024)

=== Compilation albums ===
- Meet the BellRays (2002) [compiled from Let It Blast and Grand Fury]
- Raw Collection (2003)
- Raw Collection, Vol.2 (2005)
- Merry Xmas, Love the BellRays (2008)
- It's Never To Late To Fall In Love With The Bellrays (New, Rare & Unreleased)/Introducing Lisa & The Lips (2019)

=== Compilation appearances ===
- A Vital Gesture Christmas (1996)
- A Tribute To Really Red - Teaching You the Fear Again (2020)

=== DVDs ===
- The BellRays @ the Barfly (2005)
