= The Weirdness =

Studio album by the Stooges
- Released: 5 March 2007
- Recorded: 7–30 October 2006 at Electrical Audio Studios, Chicago, Illinois, United States
- Genres: Garage rock; hard rock; jazz rock; punk rock
- Length: 40:04
- Label: Virgin
- Producer: Steve Albini

The Stooges chronology
Telluric Chaos (2005)	The Weirdness (2007)	Have Some Fun: Live at Ungano's (2010)

Professional ratings
Aggregate scores
Source	Rating
Metacritic	44/100
Review scores
Source	Rating
AllMusic	3/5 stars
Alternative Press	0.5/5 stars
Entertainment Weekly	B−
Mojo	4/5 stars
NME	7/10
Pitchfork	1.0/10
PopMatters	3/10
Rolling Stone	3.5/5 stars
Slant Magazine	2.5/5 stars
Uncut	2/10

The Weirdness is the fourth studio album by American proto-punk band The Stooges. Released on 5 March 2007, it was the first Stooges album of new material since Raw Power in 1973, and is also the final album to feature guitarist Ron Asheton, who died in early 2009. Founding members Iggy Pop (vocals), Ron Asheton (guitar), and Scott Asheton (drums) are featured, along with new band member Mike Watt (bass guitar), formerly of Minutemen, and returning guest musician Steve Mackay (saxophone), who appeared on The Stooges' 1970 album, Fun House.

== Recording ==
The album was recorded by Steve Albini at his Electrical Audio studio in Chicago, Illinois during October 2006, and was mastered at Abbey Road Studios in London, England in December. Bassist Mike Watt posted a day-by-day diary of the recording sessions on his website, but this was deleted without explanation. Watt referred to the album's title as Secret Plan in his diary entries.

According to Watt's online diary, the songs recorded during the sessions included a finalized version of "My Idea of Fun" (first heard on the live CD Telluric Chaos) and a cover of The Beatles' "I Wanna Be Your Man" (more faithful to the Rolling Stones version), while a 20 November article on the album, derived mainly from an interview with Pop, also gives the following song titles as appearing on the album: "Trollin'", "ATM", "You Can't Have Friends, "The Weirdness", and "Greedy Awful People". Further titles were announced in December after the album was mastered, and the final track listing was announced by Virgin Records on 30 January 2007.

== Release ==
Two singles, "My Idea of Fun" and "Free & Freaky", were released on the iTunes Store on 20 February 2007. The album was also released as a vinyl LP with four bonus tracks.

"My Idea of Fun" was performed on the reality television show Bam's Unholy Union.

As of 2009 it has sold over 30,000 copies in United States.

== Reception ==
According to the aggregate review website Metacritic, the album received a score of 44, which indicates mixed reception, from 32 critic scores. Pitchfork gave the album an exceptionally low 1.0/10 rating, writing that it "hideously disgraces the band's original work." PopMatters wrote "Like every other inferior album by a defunct cult band that has unexpectedly reunited, it is a danger to the band's legacy. Every assessment or endorsement of the Stooges must now be made with The Weirdness somewhere in the equation, and most fans will no doubt reference it with either apology or dismissal. Exactly why was this album made?" Drowned in Sound wrote, "Devoid of inspiration, lacking in any edge, this is pathetic."

BBC Music, on the other hand, wrote "Fast, tight, and ready for action, [The Weirdness is] entertaining, exuberant and fun." Mojo called the album "a brash, modern-sounding rock record that also sounds more vital than most bands 40 years The Stooges' junior."

== Track listing ==
All tracks are written by Iggy Pop, Ron Asheton, and Scott Asheton, except where noted.

Standard edition
No.	Title	Length
1.	"Trollin'"	3:05
2.	"You Can't Have Friends"	2:22
3.	"ATM"	3:15
4.	"My Idea of Fun"	3:17
5.	"The Weirdness"	3:45
6.	"Free & Freaky"	2:39
7.	"Greedy Awful People"	2:07
8.	"She Took My Money"	3:48
9.	"The End of Christianity"	4:19
10.	"Mexican Guy"	3:29
11.	"Passing Cloud"	4:04
12.	"I'm Fried"	3:44

Bonus tracks
No.	Title	Writer(s)	Length
13.	"O Solo Mio" (Vinyl edition and Japanese edition-only bonus track)		6:18
14.	"Claustrophobia" (Vinyl edition-only bonus track)
15.	"I Wanna Be Your Man" (Vinyl edition and iTunes editions-only bonus track)	John Lennon/Paul McCartney	3:42
16.	"Sounds of Leather" (Vinyl edition-only bonus track)

== Personnel ==
The Stooges

- Iggy Pop – vocals
- Ron Asheton – guitar
- Scott Asheton – drums
- Mike Watt – bass guitar

Guest musicians

- Steve Mackay – saxophone
- Brendan Benson – backing vocals on "Free & Freaky"

Production

- Steve Albini – engineering
- Nick Webb – mastering
- Chris Wujek – technical assistance
- Rob Vester – assistant engineer
- Henry McGroggan – production coordination
- Eric Fischer – production coordination
- Sean Mosher-Smith – art direction and design
- Chapman Baehler – photography
- Robert Matheu – photography (of The Stooges live at the Hammersmith Apollo, London)

== Charts ==
Chart (2007)	Peak position
Belgian Albums (Ultratop Flanders)	89
Belgian Albums (Ultratop Wallonia)	78
Dutch Albums (Album Top 100)	37
French Albums (SNEP)	53
German Albums (Offizielle Top 100)	65
Japanese Albums (Oricon)	88
Swedish Albums (Sverigetopplistan)	35
UK Albums (OCC)	81
US Billboard 200	130
US Independent Albums (Billboard)	47
US Heatseekers Albums (Billboard)	3
