= Lisa Kekaula =

American singer

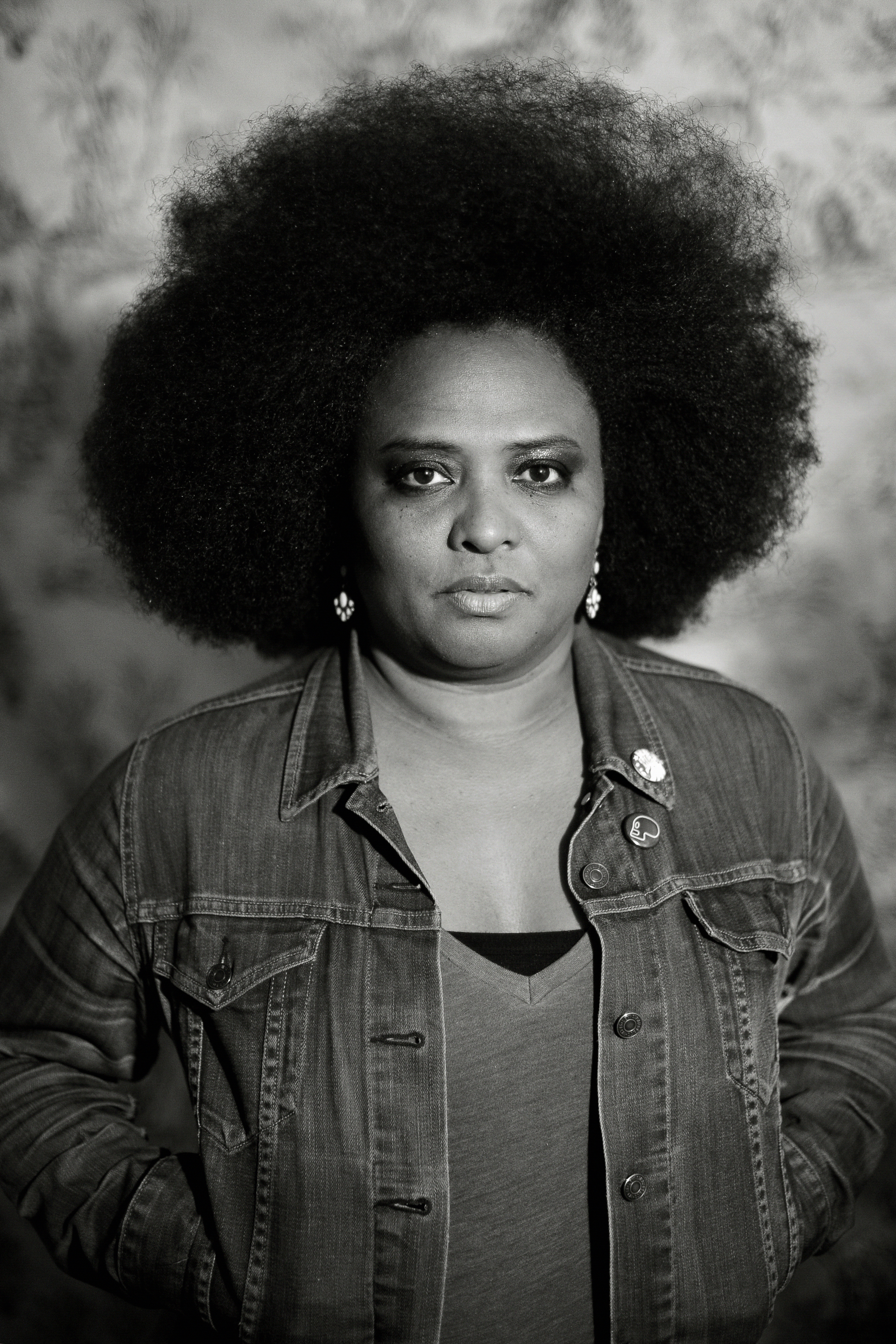
- Kekaula in 2013

Background information
- Born: July 31, 1967 (age 59); Los Angeles, California, U.S.
- Genres: garage rock, soul, punk rock
- Occupation: Singer
- Years active: 1990–present

Lisa Kekaula (born July 31, 1967) is the lead singer of American "rock 'n' soul" band The Bellrays.

== Early years ==
Kekaula was born to an African-American mother, Linda and Native Hawaiian father, Alan Kekaula in Los Angeles, California, although the family continued to grow and relocated to suburban Moreno Valley, California. While there, Kekaula began to immerse herself in singing and had her first appearance in a talent show at Edgemont Elementary School. She graduated from Moreno Valley High School and then from the University of California, Riverside.

== Career ==
Since 1990, Kekaula has been vocalist with the Bellrays.

From 2003 to 2007, Kekaula joined a cast of vocalists guesting at live performances by the surviving members of the MC5.

Kekaula has featured on two singles by British house music band Basement Jaxx, most famously "Good Luck"; the tracks "Realizer" and "High and Low", from the 2004 album Legion of Boom by The Crystal Method; and "Talkin' in My Sleep", from The Bloody Beetroots' first studio album, Romborama. She has also been featured on The Legendary Tigerman's fifth studio album, Femina, released in 2009.

In 2014, Kekaula contributed vocals to two tracks for the Re-Licked album of Iggy and the Stooges songs re-recorded by former Stooges guitarist James Williamson. The songs were also released as a 7" single. In 2016, Kekaula and Williamson collaborated again, releasing a single in aid of a Hawaiian homeless charity.

== Personal life ==
Kekaula is married to Robert Vennum, also of the Bellrays; they have one daughter, Twylla. In 2014, Kekaula and Vennum released an album under the name Lisa and the Lips.

Kekaula was raised Catholic.
