= Sarah Stolfa =

American photographer

Sarah Stolfa (born 1975) is an American contemporary artist, photographer, and musician.

== Biography ==
Stolfa attended Drexel University's photography program and graduated from Yale University's MFA program in 2009. Stolfa's most recognizable series, 'The Regulars', won her The New York Times Photography Contest for College Students in 2004.

As a bartender at Philadelphia’s McGlinchey’s Tavern, Stolfa began to photograph her regulars opposite the bar. Her carefully composed, large-scale color prints express the intimacy and sincerity in worker and patron relationships. Furthermore, Stolfa’s images confront a social commentary on the urban bar experience with the isolated subjects and their props, namely, ashtrays, mugs, and money. Stolfa creates powerful portraits of the diverse group of regulars in a way that is reminiscent of Seventeenth Century Dutch paintings in their color, lighting, and decipherable detail.

Stolfa had a solo show at the Pearlstein Gallery at Drexel University in 2004.

Stolfa is the Executive Director of the Philadelphia Photo Arts Center, a non-profit organization which opened in the late summer of 2009.

Stolfa also played Farfisa organ in the Delta 72 in the late 90s.

== Exhibitions ==
- 2005: Photography 24, Perkins Center for the Arts, Moorestown, NJ
- 2005: Noteworthy, Perkins Center for the Arts, Moorestown, NJ
- 2005: Arcadia Solo Exhibition, Old Greenwich, CT (solo)
- 2006: Second Woodmere Triennial of Contemporary Photography, Woodmere Art Museum, Philadelphia, PA
- 2007: Women to Watch: Photography in Philadelphia, The Galleries at Moore College of Art and Design, Philadelphia, PA
- 2008: Yale MFA Photography 2008, Green Gallery, Yale University, New Haven, CT

== Publications ==
- 2009 The Regulars, Monograph, Artisan books

== General references ==
- 2006 "Photo Finish," The Philadelphia Weekly, June 9–15
- 2004 "A Student, Sarah Stolfa, Hits the Big Time," Drexel, The Alumni Magazine of Drexel University
- 2006 "Tale of the Triennial," Art Matters, April
- 2006 "With a Broad Brush," Philadelphia Weekly, Fall Guide, Sept 13–19
- 2006 "Last Call," Philadelphia City Paper, Sept 21–28
- 2006 "Bar Examinations," Philadelphia Style Magazine, Fall
- 2006 "Philadelphia: Fall Exhibitions Short List," Art Review, Fall
- 2007 The New Yorker, Jan 8
- 2007 The New York Times Magazine, April 29
