= Ready to Die (The Stooges album) =

Studio album by Iggy and the Stooges
- Released: April 30, 2013
- Recorded: 2012–2013
- Studios: Fantasy, Berkeley, California
- Genres: Garage rock; punk rock
- Length: 34:44
- Label: Fat Possum
- Producer: James Williamson

Iggy and the Stooges chronology
Raw Power Live: In the Hands of the Fans (2011)	Ready to Die (2013)

Ready to Die is the fifth and final studio album by American rock band the Stooges, credited to Iggy and the Stooges. The album was released on April 30, 2013, by Fat Possum Records. The album was the band's biggest success on the Billboard 200 chart, where it debuted at number 96.

== Background ==
On February 25, 2013, Iggy Pop announced that The Stooges' fifth album Ready to Die would be released on April 30, 2013. In July 2013, in an interview with Guitar World, Iggy Pop spoke about the song titled "DD's", saying: "It's funny that that song gets a lot of attention. If it was as bad as some people say it is, it wouldn't be getting noticed. But it's getting noticed as much as its subject gets noticed."

== Critical reception ==
Professional ratings
Aggregate scores
Source	Rating
Metacritic	66/100
Review scores
Source	Rating
AllMusic	4/5 stars
The A.V. Club	C
Consequence of Sound	3.5/5 stars
Chicago Tribune	3/4 stars
The Guardian	3/5 stars
The Independent	4/5 stars
NME	8/10
Pitchfork	5.6/10
Rolling Stone	3.5/5 stars
Slant Magazine	1.5/5 stars

Ready to Die was met with generally favorable reviews from music critics. At Metacritic, which assigns a weighted average score out of 100 to reviews and ratings from mainstream critics, the album received a score of 66, based on 35 reviews. On April 28, 2013, in the first major review of the album, authorized Stooges biographer Jeffrey Morgan wrote on his website: "Strangely believe it, this new 40th Anniversary Edition ain’t all that bad. I could continue waxing euphonic about how fantoonie this sonic sizzler is, but your time would be far better spent spinning it instead." Stephen Thomas Erlewine of AllMusic gave the album four out of five stars, saying "Ready to Die is, against all odds, a terrific Stooges album." Ryan Bray of Consequence of Sound gave the album three and a half stars out of four, saying "Ready to Die is another torrid tour de force from a band built for speed, not comfort."

Tim Stegall of The Austin Chronicle gave the album four out of five stars, writing that "Ready to Die finds the quintet on Fat Possum, making them indie artists for the first time, and they give their new label the best produced, loudest, and slickest – without sacrificing any primal grit and drive – Stooges disc yet." Jason Heller of The A.V. Club gave the album a C, saying, "Luckily there are enough high points on the album to mark it as a clear improvement over The Weirdness." Julian Marszalek of The Quietus gave the album positive review, but added that "[i]t's not going to replace the band's first three peerless albums in your affections, and the chances of frequent revisits after its initial satisfying of curiosity are low." Jamie Fullerton of NME gave the album an eight out of ten, saying "The most significant thing about the album is the return of guitarist James Williamson following the death of Ron Asheton in 2009."

Kitty Empire of The Guardian gave the album three out of five stars saying, "Obviously, RTD is no sequel to Raw Power. But there is an oomph to it. Despite being crass and ill-judged, RTD is actually fun in parts." Jesse Cataldo of Slant Magazine gave the album one and a half stars out of five, saying, "The odd duck here is the surprisingly gentle 'The Departed', a slide guitar–laced burble which compares Iggy Pop to the yellowed pages of a photo album. It's honest and introspective, and has no place whatsoever on a Stooges album, a fact that only serves as a reminder that a new Stooges album has no real place in the year 2013." Greg Kot of the Chicago Tribune gave the album three out of four stars, saying "Though it is nowhere near as indelible as the Stooges' first three landmark albums, Ready to Die is much stronger than the band's 2007 comeback, The Weirdness." Jon Young of Spin gave the album an eight out of ten, saying "Ready to Die is a weirdly exhilarating gem, thanks to Iggy's fiery eloquence and the Stooges' still-raw power. Apparently rock'n'roll can be an old man's game after all."

== Track listing ==
All tracks are written by Iggy Pop and James Williamson except where noted.

No.	Title	Writer(s)	Length
1.	"Burn"		3:37
2.	"Sex & Money"		3:18
3.	"Job"		3:05
4.	"Gun"		3:07
5.	"Unfriendly World"		3:46
6.	"Ready to Die"		3:06
7.	"DD's"		3:12
8.	"Dirty Deal"		3:42
9.	"Beat That Guy"		3:15
10.	"The Departed"	Pop, Williamson, Scott Asheton	4:36
Total length:			34:44

iTunes bonus track
No.	Title	Length
11.	"Dying Breed"	3:12

Japan bonus track
No.	Title	Writer(s)	Length
11.	"The Departed" (Instrumental version)	Pop, Williamson, Asheton	4:36

== Personnel ==
The Stooges

- Iggy Pop – vocals
- James Williamson – guitar
- Mike Watt – bass
- Scott Asheton – drums
- Steve Mackay – saxophone

Other musicians

- Jason Butler – percussion
- Mark Culbertson – double bass
- Toby Dammit (Larry Mullins) – percussion, drums on "The Departed"
- Petra Haden – violin, background vocals
- Don Rooke – lap steel guitar
- Hugh Marsh – violin
- Scott Thurston – keyboards
- Michelle Willis – pump organ

=== Production ===
- Recorded at Fantasy Studios, Berkeley, California
- Jesse Nichols – recording & mixing engineer

== Charts ==
Chart performance for Ready to Die
Chart (2013)	Peak position
Austrian Albums (Ö3 Austria)	26
Belgian Albums (Ultratop Flanders)	100
Belgian Albums (Ultratop Wallonia)	57
French Albums (SNEP)	36
German Albums (Offizielle Top 100)	62
Scottish Albums (Official Charts)	80
Swedish Albums (Sverigetopplistan)	49
Swiss Albums (Schweizer Hitparade)	50
UK Albums (Official Charts)	77
UK Independent Albums (Official Charts)	12
