= Steve Mackay =

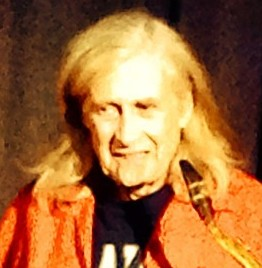
- Mackay in 2014

Background information
- Born: September 25, 1949; Grand Rapids, Michigan, US
- Died: October 10, 2015 (aged 66) Daly City, California, US
- Genres: Rock, jazz
- Instrument: Saxophone
- Years active: 1970–2015
- Formerly of: The Stooges, Carnal Kitchen, Violent Femmes, Estel

Steve Mackay (September 25, 1949 – October 10, 2015) was an American tenor saxophonist best known for his membership in the Stooges. His performances are showcased on three songs on the band's second album, Fun House (1970).

== The Stooges ==
In 1970, Mackay was familiar to the Stooges from his work with the Detroit avant-rock pioneers Carnal Kitchen. After sitting in with the Stooges on several occasions, he formally joined the group at the behest of lead singer Iggy Pop two days before they left Detroit for Los Angeles to record Fun House in May 1970. Mackay remained with the Stooges for five months before being fired by Pop in October 1970. As the band had been deteriorating from drug abuse and a dearth of professional opportunities, Mackay later recalled that he was "somewhat grateful" for being dismissed.

In 2003, Mackay rejoined the Stooges when they played their first show in twenty-nine years at the Coachella Valley Music and Arts Festival. He remained with the group until his death in 2015. During this period, he appeared on the live Stooges releases Live in Detroit (DVD) and Telluric Chaos (a live album; 2005), and two studio albums, The Weirdness (2007) and Ready to Die (2013). He also contributed to James Williamson's solo studio debut, Re-Licked (2014).

== Other collaborations ==
Throughout the 1970s and 1980s, Mackay played and recorded with a highly diverse cross-section of underground musicians, including Violent Femmes, Snakefinger, Commander Cody, Smegma, Zu, Andre Williams, the Moonlighters, Clubfoot Orchestra, and Van Rozay from San Jose, California. He was based in Ann Arbor (where he continued to work at Discount Records and perform with Carnal Kitchen and the Mojo Boogie Band, a blues rock ensemble) until 1976, when he initially relocated to the San Francisco Bay Area. During this period, he supported his musical endeavors by working as a stationary engineer at various San Francisco sewage treatment plants.

In the late 1980s and early 1990s, Mackay performed in a reconstituted lineup of Carnal Kitchen with then-wife Annie Garcia-Mackay, a blues singer and bassist. In 2001, they divorced due to mutual differences; later that year, he was remarried to Patricia Smith.

By the 1990s, Mackay's profile had gradually lowered as he took up residence in Pacifica, California (following a sojourn in Amsterdam) and began work as an electrician. The wider perception was that Mackay was dead. In 2000, Stooges biography pages on websites for MTV, VH1, and Rolling Stone included an item indicating that Mackay had died as a result of a heroin overdose in the 1970s. The origin of this story is unknown, but music journalist Nick Kent reported the "fact" in a piece on Pop in the mid-1970s. According to Alexis Petridis, "Kent had apparently misheard the lyrics of Iggy Pop's 'Dum Dum Boys,' which mentioned the death of Stooges roadie and bassist Thomas 'Zeke' Zettner." A second rumor circulated following the AIDS-related death of a San Francisco-based marathon runner and author who shared Mackay's name. Scott Nydegger from the small record label and noise collective Radon disproved the rumors by contacting Mackay and arranging to release his first solo recordings.

Radon released the "Death City" single in 1999, and Mackay began to perform and record regularly with a revolving line-up of musicians associated with Radon. The first full-scale tour of Steve Mackay and the Radon Ensemble was mounted in July 2003; with a percussion-heavy lineup that featured bassist Marlon Kasberg (Liquorball), drummer Sam Lohman (Nimrod 36), multi-instrumentalist Travis McAlister (Nequaquam Vacuum), scrap percussionist and vocalist Noah Mickens (also Nequaquam Vacuum), and drummer and band leader Scott Nydegger (Sikhara). Other musicians who have performed and recorded with the Radon Ensemble since then included the multi-instrumentalist Tyler Armstrong, projectionist Ed Cooper, bassist Giovanni Donadini, Nyko Esterle, multi-instrumentalists Kamil Kruta of Koonda Holaa and Dan Kauffman, bassist Jason LaFarge, saxophonist Vinnie Paternostro, Fabrizio Modonese-Polumbo, saxophonist Shane Pringle, Frank Pullen, Suzanne Thorpe (Mercury Rev), John Wiese (Bastard Noise), and drummer Ed Wilcox.

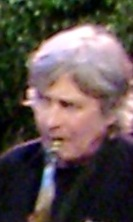
Mackay performing in 2007

Mackay also appeared at live shows by Violent Femmes, with whom he played off and on for over two decades after appearing on their album The Blind Leading the Naked.

Radon released the Smegma–Mackay collaboration album 30 Years of Service in 2005, his full-length album Michigan and Arcturus (2006), a vinyl-only release with the Radon Ensemble entitled "Tunnel Diner", and in 2008 Resipiscent released Smegma's Live 2004 featuring Mackay and Jello Biafra. Mackay's solo discography included a self-released collection of solo and group demos from the 1980s called En Voyage, and such compilation albums as Popular Electronic Uzak, You've Got Your Orders 3, and Multiball Magazine Issue 2. The Steve Mackay Ensemble continued to perform live and on radio, and embarked on a tour of the US and Europe in 2006.

In December 2007, Mackay recorded two day sessions at the Big Baldy's Toe studio in Claremont CA, home to Amps for Man Is the Bastard founder Henry Barnes. This session yielded among others the single "Prisoner" which was written by Steve Mackay around 1984 and produced and arranged in 2007 by Kamilsky of Koonda Holaa. In 2009 Iggy Pop contributed his version of vocals to the track and subsequently it was used in a French movie L'Étoile du jour (Morning Star) directed by Sophie Blondy. Another track from this session "Kristallnacht" was released on Sometimes Like This I Talk. Both tracks feature bassist Mike Watt and drummer Randy Scarberry. Musical friendship between Steve Mackay and Kamilsky lasted from 2000 till his death and spawned hours of unreleased recordings and countless tours.

Mackay continued to collaborate with the Clubfoot Orchestra members, sitting in occasionally at the Bay Area Boat Club's parties. In 2011 Radon and SOOPA released Mackay's new album Sometimes Like This I Talk which features other members of the Stooges, and also the album Machine Gun from U.S.S. with Mackay on sax. Also in 2011, Mackay released North Beach Jazz featuring punk bassist Mike Watt, a member of the reunited Stooges. Mackay was also featured on the record Titans, released in 2012 by the Portuguese stoner-psychedelic rock band Black Bombaim, playing sax on track 'C'.

In September 2012, Mackay joined San Francisco band Coo Coo Birds in the studio, after previously meeting the band's bassist Charles James Gonzalez at Smiley's Saloon in Bolinas, California. Mackay laid down saxophone parts for two songs recorded by Coo Coo Birds, "Black Blue Jeans" (from 2013's Psychedelic Warrior) and a cover of Sam the Sham & The Pharaohs' "Li'l Red Riding Hood".

In 2014, Mackay played on the song "A Higher Price To Pay", by the French heavy rock band the Meredith Hunters. He also toured with Bunktilt.

In 2015, Mackay, lo-fi pioneer R. Stevie Moore and Scott Nydegger (Sikhara) were featured on Shanghai-based experimental punk band Round Eye's eponymous LP, which was released by Florida label Ripping Records. In 2017, they released their 2nd LP Monstervision on Sudden Death Records which contained Mackay's final recordings.

== Death ==
Mackay died in October 2015 from sepsis at a hospital in Daly City, California at the age of 66.

A Tribute for Steve Mackay was held at Winter's Tavern in Pacifica, California on February 27, 2016. The musicians who participated included Jello Biafra and Mike Watt, who performed Side 2 of the Stooges' Fun House album. Iggy Pop contributed a short poem that Watt played for the audience through an iPhone.

== Discography ==
with The Stooges

- Fun House (1970)
- Telluric Chaos (2005)
- The Weirdness (2007)
- Have Some Fun: Live at Ungano's (2010)
- Raw Power Live: In the Hands of the Fans (2011)
- Ready to Die (2013)

with Violent Femmes

- The Blind Leading the Naked (1986)

with Estel

- Untitled EP (2009) featuring Mike Watt
- A Massive Glorious Uphill Shit-Fight. (2011)

with Round Eye

- Round Eye (Ripping Records, 2014) featuring R. Stevie Moore
- Monstervision (Sudden Death Records) (2015)

with James Williamson

- Re-Licked (2014)

Solo

- Michigan and Arcturus (2006)
- Sometimes Like This I Talk (2011)
- North Beach Jazz (2013)
