= Raw Power =

Studio album by Iggy and the Stooges
- Released: February 7, 1973
- Recorded: September–October 1972
- Studios: CBS, London
- Genres: Proto-punk; garage rock; glam punk; hard rock
- Length: 33:57
- Label: Columbia
- Producers: David Bowie; Iggy Pop

Iggy and the Stooges chronology
Fun House (1970)	Raw Power (1973)	Metallic K.O. (1976)

Singles from Raw Power
- 1. "Search and Destroy" Released: June 1973; 2. "Raw Power" Released: 1973 (Japan)

Raw Power is the third studio album by American rock band the Stooges (credited as Iggy and the Stooges), released on February 7, 1973, by Columbia Records. The album departed from the "groove-ridden, feel-based songs" of the band's first two records in favor of a more anthemic hard rock approach inspired by new guitarist James Williamson, who co-wrote the album's eight songs with singer Iggy Pop.

Pop produced the recording sessions himself with David Bowie assisting in post-production work, though the team were allotted only one day to mix the album and the resulting fidelity was poor. Later reissues have attempted to either correct or enhance the original mix, most notably Pop's 1997 remix, which became notorious for its extreme volume and compression.

Though not initially commercially successful, Raw Power gained a cult following in the years following its release and is considered a forerunner of punk rock alongside its predecessors, The Stooges (1969) and Fun House (1970). The Guardian wrote that "it has since been acknowledged as one of the most influential records in rock history". Williamson's raw guitar sound deeply influenced acts of different music genres such as the Sex Pistols, Johnny Marr of the Smiths, and Kurt Cobain of Nirvana.

== Background ==
After their first two albums The Stooges (1969) and Fun House (1970) were released to little commercial success, the Stooges were in disarray: the band had officially broken up, bassist Dave Alexander was fighting alcoholism, and singer Iggy Pop's heroin addiction was escalating prior to the intervention of David Bowie. Pop later recalled, "Very few people recognized the quality of the Stooges' songwriting, it was really meticulous. And to his credit, the only person I'd ever known of in print to notice it, among my peers of professional musicians, was Bowie. He noticed it right off." Having signed on as a solo artist to Columbia Records, Pop relocated to London, where he was to write and record an album with James Williamson, who served as the Stooges' second guitarist from November 1970 until the band's initial dissolution in July 1971. When they failed to find a suitable English rhythm section, Williamson suggested that former Stooges Ron Asheton and Scott Asheton fly over and participate in the recording sessions, leading to the band's reformation under the new name of "Iggy and the Stooges". Although he was the band's founding guitarist, the elder Asheton reluctantly agreed to switch to electric bass.

== Recording ==
Initial demo sessions were held at RG Jones Recording Studios in Wimbledon with sound engineer Gerry Kitchingham and at Olympic Studios in Barnes with sound engineer Keith Harwood, with most of the songs rejected by the band's management. Pop said that Columbia executives insisted on two ballads, one for each side of the album: "Gimme Danger" and "I Need Somebody". The album itself was recorded at CBS Studios in London with staff engineer Mike Ross-Trevor from September 10 to October 6, 1972. Pop produced and mixed the album by himself; unfortunately, his botched first attempt mixed most of the instruments into one stereo channel and the vocals into the other, with little regard for balance or tone quality. Tony Defries, the head of Bowie's management company MainMan, informed Pop that the album would be remixed by Bowie. Pop agreed to this, saying that "the other choice was I wasn't going to get my album out. I think Defries told me that CBS refused to release it like that, I don't know", but insisted that his own mix for "Search and Destroy" be retained. Due to budgetary constraints, Bowie remixed the other seven songs in a single day at Los Angeles' Western Sound Recorders in October 1972. Pop said of the production:

To the best of my recollection it was done in a day. I don't think it was two days. On a very, very old board, I mean this board was old! An Elvis type of board, old-tech, low-tech, in a poorly lit, cheap old studio with very little time. To David's credit, he listened with his ear to each thing and talked it out with me, I gave him what I thought it should have, he put that in its perspective, added some touches. He's always liked the most recent technology, so there was something called a Time Cube you could feed a signal into -- it looked like a bong, a big plastic tube with a couple of bends in it -- and when the sound came out the other end, it sort of shot at you like an echo effect. He used that on the guitar in "Gimme Danger", a beautiful guitar echo overload that's absolutely beautiful; and on the drums in "Your Pretty Face Is Going To Hell". His concept was, "You're so primitive, your drummer should sound like he's beating a log!" It's not a bad job that he did...I'm very proud of the eccentric, odd little record that came out.

Bowie later recalled:

...the most absurd situation I encountered when I was recording was the first time I worked with Iggy Pop. He wanted me to mix Raw Power, so he brought the 24-track tape in, and he put it up. He had the band on one track, lead guitar on another and him on a third. Out of 24 tracks there were just three tracks that were used. He said 'see what you can do with this'. I said, 'Jim, there's nothing to mix'. So we just pushed the vocal up and down a lot. On at least four or five songs that was the situation, including "Search and Destroy". That's got such a peculiar sound because all we did was occasionally bring the lead guitar up and take it out.

When Morgan Neville's documentary film on Raw Power was released in 2010, they demonstrated that each individual instrument was indeed recorded on its own track on the original multi-track tapes, suggesting that Bowie was either mistaken or working with a copy that had mixed down the instruments on to the same track.

=== Alternate mixes ===
Rough Power, a collection of Pop's original mixes for Raw Power, was released by Bomp Records in 1993.

Low-fidelity copies of Pop's original mixes circulated among fans for years. In 1993, a selection of these original mixes was released by Bomp Records as Rough Power. Fans and critics generally agreed that the original mixes were interesting, but not necessarily superior to Bowie's efforts. Of the Rough Power release, Pop has remarked that "what David and I came up with at these sessions was better than that."

In 1996, Columbia Records "invited" Pop to remix the entire album for re-release on CD. Pop said in the liner notes that had he declined, the studio would have remixed it without his blessing. Pop cited longtime encouragement from fans and peers, the existence of Rough Power, his distaste for how the original 1989 CD release of Raw Power sounded, and the fact that Columbia would release the new mix on its subsidiary Legacy Recordings as factors that led him to go through with the new mix, which was undertaken at New York's Sony Music Studios in 1996. The remixed edition was released on April 22, 1997. In the album's accompanying liner notes, Pop states the following:

In retrospect, I think the little touches Bowie put on the mix helped and I think some of the things MainMan did helped, and more than anything else, what the whole experience did was to get me out of Detroit and onto a world stage. And also I learned a helluva lot being over there in England and I started thinking differently. It led to a very ambitious piece of work, and that's fine. But the fact was that neither Bowie's mix nor my previous mix could do justice to the power of the band or even to the legibility of the vocal ... I feel that now I have the wherewithall [sic], the position, and the expertise at my disposal to give this thing its due sonically, and I didn't have that before. So it's kind of like I'm finishing that off. I don't think you can beat David's mix, it's very creative. But this is just a simple, straight band mix of a powerful band. I feel like there's a closure on it and that's a nice thing.

American music journalist and essayist Robert Christgau wrote approvingly of Pop's Raw Power remix. Upon reviewing the 1997 edition of Raw Power, Christgau – who in the past had complained about how Bowie had mixed the original album "down till it's thin as an epicure's wrist" and inflicted "ruinous underbassing" – wrote,

Strict constructionists and lo-fi snobs charge indignantly that by remixing his own album Iggy has made a mockery of history and done irreparable damage to a priceless work of art. This is really stupid. Before it was anointed the Platonic idea of rock and roll by desperate young men who didn't have much else to choose from, first-generation Iggyphiles charged just as indignantly that David Bowie had mixed the real thing way too thin--as Iggy observes, this classic-by-comparison always sounded "weedy" (although, not to insult a valued colleague, "David's" version was also "very creative"). So the pumped bass and vocals Iggy has uncovered on the original tapes, which were supposed to coexist with their high-end screech to begin with, are a quantum improvement. Plus you can finally hear the celeste on "Penetration"--sounds great! Only the slow ones, which like all of Iggy's slow ones are not as good as his fast ones, stand between a statement of principle and a priceless work of art.

On the other hand, some fans – among them guitarist Robert Quine – felt that the new remix was as unfaithful to the material as the original 1973 mix, and further criticized the audible distortion in the new mix. Quine said, "[Iggy's] one of the greats but I wonder about what he did to that record with the new [Raw Power] remix, which is atrocious. 'With this remix, I think this can stand up with the latest Smashing Pumpkins.' Wow." In the reissued CD's liner notes, however, Pop points out that one of his intentions in doing the new mix was to keep audio levels in the red (which would deliberately cause such distortion) while at the same time making the music more "powerful and listenable". This new version is arguably the "loudest album ever", reaching RMS of -4 dB, rare even by today's standards.

James Williamson and Ron Asheton have both stated that they prefer Bowie's original mix of the album over Pop's remixed version. Williamson stated:

I personally think [the remixed Raw Power] sucked. I gotta tell ya that I like the IDEA of what [Iggy] tried to do, and I talked to him about it, and there's a lot of factors involved, but at the time, none of us liked Bowie's mix, but given everything, Iggy, when he went in to mix it, he found out that the guy who had recorded it originally had not gotten a lot of level on certain things, like the bass and drums, especially the bass, so he didn't have a lot to work with. Then Iggy, on his mix, he left a bunch of guitar stuff on there that probably shouldn't have been left in, and just odds and ends. Bowie's not my favorite guy, but I have to say that overall, I think he did a pretty good job.

Asheton stated:

Don Fleming goes, "You know what? When Iggy's Raw Power mix comes out, I'll bet you're gonna go – we always used to say how bad the original David Bowie mix of Raw Power was – Fleming's going, "When you hear Iggy's mix, I guarantee you're gonna say, 'Man, remember that great mix that David Bowie did?'" So I heard it, I got the advance copy from his manager, and listened to it. Then I called Fleming and I'm going, "Gee, Don, I just listened to Iggy's mix of Raw Power. Man, I sure loved that old David Bowie mix. Was it ever great." Basically, all that Iggy did was take all the smoothness and all the effects off James [Williamson]'s guitar, so his leads sound really abrupt and stilty and almost clumsy, and he just put back every single grunt, groan, and word he ever said on the whole fuckin' soundtrack. He just totally restored everything that was cut out of him in the first mix, and I thought, Damn, I really did like the old mix better.

In 2002, Bowie said that his original mix of Raw Power is "the version I still prefer over the later remix – it has more wound-up ferocity and chaos and, in my humble opinion, is a hallmark roots sound for what was later to become punk."

In 2010, Pop remarked,

I did my [Raw Power] remix...which I knew at the time in the '90s there was a muscle-bound rock metal thing going around, and I knew that people couldn't hear the record as it was originally mixed and mastered in that environment. So I thought if I make it unbearably loud, it would sell, and it did!

[The original Raw Power]'s a good mix of a particular taste. It was very similar to the way David had his own records mixed around that era. It's peculiarly English. What I didn't know at the time was that it was disastrously mastered (after Bowie mixed it). By that time, we had no communication with management, who had decided to let us go.

It doesn't fall into the contemporary standards of records today that explode with a sonic flood all over your car, until you feel like you want to retch. But when you turn it up, the treble is really good. It's got a good character. There were certain production touches that come across; the overdubbed guitar treatment to "Gimme Danger" was Bowie's doing, and it's beautiful.

Pop and Bowie's mixes were both remastered in 2012 for a Record Store Day double LP by Kevin Gray and Mark Wilder, respectively; this remastering was free of clipping.

In 2023, both mixes of the album were once again remastered, free of clipping, along with the release of a new edition of the album to commemorate its fiftieth anniversary.

== Musical style ==
Raw Power has often been classified as a proto-punk or garage rock album. According to Brett Callwood, it abandoned the "groove-ridden, feel-based songs" of the band's first two albums in favor of a more anthemic hard rock approach inspired by Williamson, who co-wrote the album's eight songs with Pop. Similarly, music critic Joe S. Harrington said that the hard rock album demonstrated a "totally overpowering" sound, "a sledgehammer attack of brutal ill will", while author Dave Thompson noted Pop's "nihilistic hard rock bellowing" throughout. In another analysis, PopMatters writer Iain Ellis said the album can be seen in retrospect as punk metal, while Tucson Weekly's Jarret Keene deemed it "garage-punk-metal" fusion.

== Marketing and sales ==
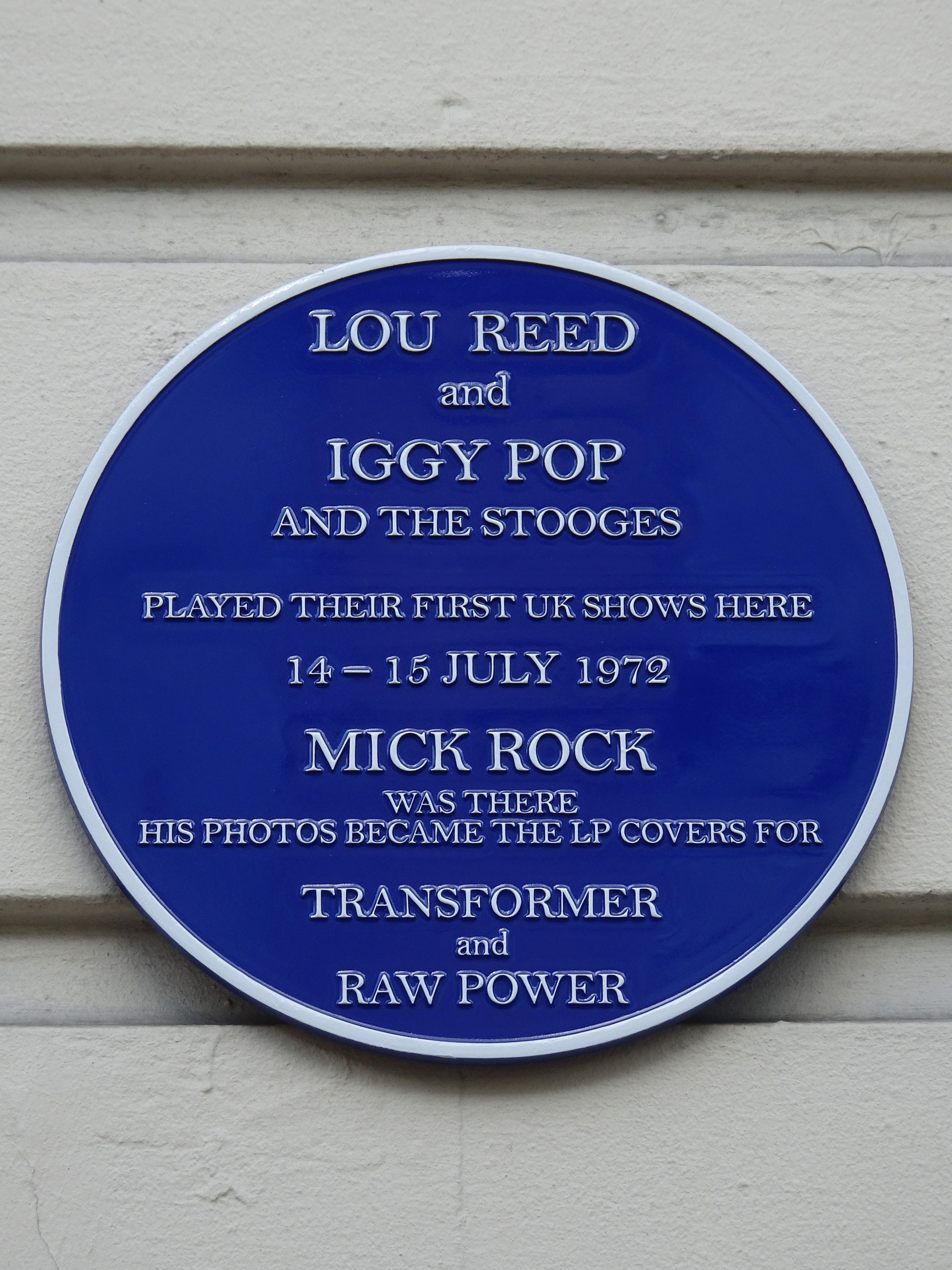
Blue plaque at 275 Pentonville Road, London, marking the gigs of 14 and 15 July 1972 at which the Stooges and Lou Reed played; a photograph from one of these shows by Mick Rock appears on the cover of Raw Power.

Raw Power was released on February 7, 1973 under the moniker of "Iggy and the Stooges", in contrast to the band's first two albums, which were credited to "the Stooges". The cover is a photograph of Pop taken by rock music photographer Mick Rock. The songs "Search and Destroy" and "Shake Appeal" were both released as singles (the title track was released as a single in Japan only). According to Robert Hilburn, the album was "far too radical for the corporate-rock sensibilities of radio" in 1973, and as a result it only charted for three weeks on the Top 200, peaking at number 183. The group continued touring for about a year, but Columbia dropped their contract. The Stooges were also dumped by MainMan – Tony Defries lost patience with the band after the large sum of money he advanced to them was spent on drugs. The Stooges broke up in February 1974. After spending time in a drug-fueled stupor in L.A. – and later rehab at the UCLA Neuropsychiatric Institute, during which he would record the album Kill City with Williamson whilst on day release – Pop re-joined Bowie's entourage by the spring of 1975, and emerged as a solo artist in 1976.

== Critical reception ==
Original mix ratings
Aggregate scores
Source	Rating
Metacritic	92/100 (2010 reissue)
Review scores
Source	Rating
AllMusic	5/5 stars
Chicago Tribune	4/4 stars
Christgau's Record Guide	B+
Entertainment Weekly	A−
Mojo	4/5 stars
Q	5/5 stars
The Rolling Stone Album Guide	4/5 stars
Spin	5/5 stars
Spin Alternative Record Guide	9/10
Uncut	5/5 stars

Raw Power received much praise from contemporary critics. Dave Marsh proclaimed that it was already "the best album of the '70s", as Pop had "summed everything up and it took him only nine songs to do it." Ben Edmunds from Phonograph Record called it "an experience so overpowering that it forces new definitions for even the most familiar things", arguing in March that it will undoubtedly be the album of the year. According to Lester Bangs, the "by-now banal words 'heavy metal' were invested for this group", while "the ferocious assertiveness of the lyrics is at once slightly absurd and indicative of a confused, violently defensive stance that's been a rock tradition from the beginning". In Stereo Review, he called the album a "comeback of major proportions" and "monomaniacal fury so genuine" that it may be too overwhelming for listeners, concluding that, "whether you laugh at them or accept their chaotic rumble on its own terms, they're fascinating and authentic, the apotheosis of every parental nightmare." Reviewing Raw Power for Rolling Stone, Lenny Kaye praised its uncompromising music and said, "for the first time, the Stooges have used the recording studio as more than a recapturing of their live show, and with David Bowie helping out in the mix, there is an ongoing swirl of sound that virtually drags you into the speakers". Longtime Stooges fans were less receptive to Bowie's mix for the original album; Robert Christgau later wrote of the original fan response, "first-generation Iggyphiles charged just as indignantly that David Bowie had mixed the real thing way too thin, before it was anointed the Platonic idea of rock and roll by desperate young men who didn't have much else to choose from".

Along with the Stooges' first two albums, Raw Power came to be regarded as an important proto-punk record in the years following its release. Writing of the album in retrospect, Will Hodgkinson believed that while the band's debut was "charged and brutal garage-rock" and Fun House was "lurid chaos", Raw Power was more musically sophisticated "in its debauchery". In The Trouser Press Guide to New Wave Records, Scott Isler credited Williamson's writing contributions with providing more musicality and structure to the band's songs, whose lyrics conflated sex and death. He regarded the album as "heavy metal in every sense" and "another masterpiece" from the group. Greg Kot also believed Raw Power was "another masterpiece-more heavy metal than punk", with songs more "structured but no less forceful". Nick Kent said in 2010 that Raw Power remains "the greatest, meanest-eyed, coldest-blooded hard rock tour de force ever summoned up in a recording studio". Christgau was somewhat less impressed. In his 1981 book Christgau's Record Guide: Rock Albums of the Seventies, he praised Williamson's guitar playing while writing that the side-opening tracks "Search and Destroy" and the title song "voice the Iggy Pop ethos more insanely (and aggressively) than 'I Wanna Be Your Dog'", but felt that "the rest disperses in their wake" and that Bowie had mixed the record too thinly.

Raw Power has appeared on professional listings of the greatest albums. Pitchfork named it the 83rd best album of the 1970s. In 2003, it was ranked number 125 on Rolling Stone's "The 500 Greatest Albums of All Time" list, and 128 in a 2012 revised list. In 2024, Loudwire staff elected it as the best hard rock album of 1973.

=== 1997 remix ===
1997 remix ratings
Review scores
Source	Rating
The Austin Chronicle	5/5 stars
Entertainment Weekly	A
Los Angeles Times	4/4 stars
Pitchfork	10/10
The Village Voice	A−
Wall of Sound	91/100

Raw Power's 1997 remix also received positive reviews. Writing that year in Entertainment Weekly, David Browne believed it rectified "one of rock's most exciting, but worst-recorded, audio assaults", and found it "as collar grabbing as the Stooges' skin-scratching rage itself", improving upon past releases of the album, in which "the guitars were too loud, [and] the drums buried." Hilburn gave the remix a rave review in the Los Angeles Times, writing that it "simply presents greater instrumental clarity and definition" than previous mixes and concluded, "It may have taken all these years to get the album right, but it has finally arrived." Tim Stegall from The Austin Chronicle said while the original mix "was so muted that it sounded like Vietnam being fought inside a Kleenex box", the remix is comparable to an atomic bombing and, "with its sonic gonads now fully restored, it can be further stated Raw Power is the single most dangerous rock & roll album ever made. Before or since." Christgau remained qualified in his praise. Reviewing the reissue in the Village Voice, he said "the pumped bass and vocals Iggy has uncovered on the original tapes" to be a "quantum improvement" over the original mix, but still found fault with the slower songs, "which like all of Iggy's slow ones are not as good as his fast ones, stand between a statement of principle and a priceless work of art." Nonetheless, he ranked it as the ninth best reissue of the year in his list for the 1997 Pazz & Jop critics' poll.

According to Pitchfork journalist Stuart Berman, Pop's remix of Raw Power "horrified audiophiles with a distaste for digital distortion". Christgau observed, "strict constructionists and lo-fi snobs charge indignantly that by remixing his own album Iggy has made a mockery of history and done irreparable damage to a priceless work of art." In Berman's opinion, "after spending the past 13 years having my ears ravaged by the '97 Iggy mix, I find it difficult readjusting to the leaner, original version—even with the remastering, the '97 version far outstrips it in fidelity and sheer brute force, and remains a better entry point for younger listeners seeking to understand the album's impact."

== Legacy and influence ==
Raw Power has been credited by many sources for pioneering punk rock, although Paste magazine's Lizzie Manno adds that it has "also been cited as a major influence on heavy metal and hard rock". According to Ted Maider of Consequence of Sound, Raw Power is "by far the most important punk record ever", while Diffuser.fm writer James Stafford said, "One can make a reasonable argument for whether Raw Power or its predecessor, Fun House, lays claim to 'first punk record' status." DIY's Jonathan Hatchman wrote, "Above all, the reason that Raw Power should be regarded as, at least, one of the greatest punk albums of all time, is the influence it has provided. Without it, punk may have never even happened."

Steve Jones from the Sex Pistols once said that he learned to play guitar by taking speed and playing along to Raw Power. Johnny Marr of the Smiths cited it as his all-time favorite record: "It gave me a path to follow as a guitar player. It was an opening into a world of rock & roll, sleaze, sexuality, drugs, violence and danger. That's a hard combination to beat". He also commented on Williamson's guitar playing on the album: "I'm his biggest fan. He has the technical ability of Jimmy Page without being as studious, and the swagger of Keith Richards without being sloppy. He's both demonic and intellectual, almost how you would imagine Darth Vader to sound if he was in a band." Marr added that he considered Pop "the greatest rock'n'roll singer of all time". Thurston Moore of Sonic Youth said that it was one of the albums that shaped his life and music: "That record sliced my head off. The aggression and psychosexual imagery were really mysterious and alluring. In a way, it brought me into all those other aspects of music and literature that were really intriguing, like William S. Burroughs and the Beat Generation."

Singer and guitarist Kurt Cobain of Nirvana wrote in his Journals numerous times that Raw Power was his favorite album of all time. It tops a list of the top 50 albums he thought were most influential to Nirvana's sound, as entered in his journal in 1993. Henry Rollins of Black Flag has "Search & Destroy" tattooed across his shoulder blades. He said that Raw Power is his second favorite Stooges album (after Fun House), calling it "America's greatest contribution to the hard rock scene", to compete with the "Stones, Zeppelins and the Deep Purples". Former Smiths frontman Morrissey once described "Search and Destroy" as "great" and "a very LA song". Mötley Crüe founder Nikki Sixx has cited it as a major influence: "When I was fifteen years old, I remember Iggy and the Stooges' song 'Search and Destroy' reaching out from my speakers to me like my own personal anthem." "I got into the heavier guitar stuff I was going through that adolescent anger thing. It's a common story but mine was also fueled by a father and a mother that were gone, and not really knowing where I fit into society. That song really connected with me". Guitarist John Frusciante of Red Hot Chili Peppers also praised the record: "When you think about all the ways bands these days try and expand rock and roll, most of them look pretty silly next to Raw Power. That is a definitive statement". CeeLo Green cited Raw Power as one of his favorite albums, stating that it "seems like it's all done in one take. 'Let's do that one, leave it, just try something else'. With his energy on stage, it seems as if the studio was just destroyed after that album – or at least you'd like to believe that".

The album's songs have been frequently covered. Prominent versions include the Dictators', Red Hot Chili Peppers', Dead Boys', Shotgun Messiah's, and Def Leppard's covers of "Search and Destroy" and Guns N' Roses' cover of the title track on The Spaghetti Incident?. "Iggy is so easygoing and so unpretentious, he didn't care whether we did it or not," remarked GNR guitarist Slash. "He just likes the fact that we thought of that tune." The punk rock band Penetration changed their name from The Points to Penetration due to the song off the album.

Ewan McGregor covered "Gimme Danger" for the film Velvet Goldmine, which tells the story of a character based on Bowie's Ziggy Stardust during the 1970s glam rock era.

"Gimme Danger" was also covered by Pixies frontman Frank Black for the game Ghost Recon Advanced Warfighter 2. A cover of "Search and Destroy" by Emanuel also appeared on the soundtrack to Tony Hawk's American Wasteland. Additionally, a cover of the album's namesake track "Raw Power" was performed by Romeo Delta in StarCraft II: Wings of Liberty.

In May 2010, Pop, Williamson, Mike Watt, Scott Asheton, and Steve Mackay performed Raw Power in its entirety as part of the All Tomorrow's Parties-curated Don't Look Back series.

== Track listing ==
=== Original release ===
All tracks are written by Iggy Pop and James Williamson.

Side one
No.	Title	Length
1.	"Search and Destroy"	3:29
2.	"Gimme Danger"	3:33
3.	"Your Pretty Face Is Going to Hell" (originally titled "Hard to Beat")	4:54
4.	"Penetration"	3:41

Side two
No.	Title	Length
5.	"Raw Power"	4:16
6.	"I Need Somebody"	4:53
7.	"Shake Appeal"	3:04
8.	"Death Trip"	6:07
Total length:		33:57

=== Deluxe edition ===
No.	Title	Length
1.	"Search and Destroy"	3:29
2.	"Gimme Danger"	3:33
3.	"Your Pretty Face Is Going to Hell" (originally titled "Hard to Beat")	4:54
4.	"Penetration"	3:41
5.	"Raw Power"	4:16
6.	"I Need Somebody"	4:53
7.	"Shake Appeal"	3:04
8.	"Death Trip"	6:07

Disc two – Georgia Peaches (Live at Richards, Atlanta, Georgia, October 1973)

1. "Introduction"
2. "Raw Power"
3. "Head On"
4. "Gimme Danger"
5. "Search and Destroy"
6. "I Need Somebody"
7. "Heavy Liquid"
8. "Cock in My Pocket"
9. "Open Up and Bleed"
10. "Doojiman" (Outtake from the session for Raw Power)
11. "Head On" (Rehearsal performance) (from CBS Studios Rehearsal Tape)

Disc three – Rarities, Outtakes & Alternates from the Raw Power Era

1. "I'm Hungry"
2. "I Got a Right"
3. "I'm Sick of You"
4. "Hey, Peter"
5. "Shake Appeal"
6. "Death Trip"
7. "Gimme Danger"
8. "Your Pretty Face Is Going to Hell"

Bonus DVD

- Documentary by Morgan Neville
- Live performance footage from Festival Planeta Terra, São Paulo, Brazil - November 2009

=== 2010 reissue ===
A remastered version of David Bowie's original mix along with a second disc of unreleased live tracks and soundchecks, including a live soundboard recording from Atlanta in October 1973, and liner notes written by Brian J. Bowe, was released in 2010, which was titled Legacy Edition.

On April 13, 2010, a deluxe version titled Raw Power: The Masters Edition was released, consisting of three CDs, one DVD, one 7" vinyl record, a booklet, and a pack of photo prints.

=== 2012 Record Store Day reissue ===
Raw Power saw a limited vinyl re-release for Record Store Day on April 21, 2012. The release included two LPs (one containing the remastered 1973 Bowie mix and the other containing a remastered version of the 1997 Pop mix) and a sixteen-page commemorative booklet with quotes from the band, pictures of the band from photographer Mick Rock at their infamous King's Cross Cinema show in the summer of 1972, and written pieces by British journalist Kris Needs and rock 'n roll historian Brian J. Bowe.

== Personnel ==
The Stooges

- Iggy Pop – vocals, celesta on "Penetration",, piano on "Gimme Danger" and "Raw Power", tambourine on "Your Pretty Face Is Going To Hell" and "Raw Power", backing vocals on "Penetration" and "Raw Power", production and mixing for 1997 reissue
- James Williamson – electric guitar, acoustic guitar on "Gimme Danger" and "I Need Somebody", backing vocals on "Penetration"
- Ron Asheton – bass guitar, backing vocals on "Penetration" and "Raw Power"
- Scott Asheton – drums

Additional credits

- David Bowie – mixing (1973 version)
- Bruce Dickinson – executive production on 1997 reissue
- Mick Rock – photography

== Sources ==
- Bowie, David (2005). Moonage Daydream: The Life and Times of Ziggy Stardust. Hardie Grant Books. ISBN 0789313502.
- Callwood, Brett (2011). "4: Raw Power". The Stooges: Head On. Wayne State University Press. ISBN 978-0814337103.
- Christgau, Robert (1981). "Iggy and the Stooges: Raw Power". Christgau's Record Guide: Rock Albums of the Seventies. Ticknor and Fields. ISBN 0-89919-026-X – via robertchristgau.com.
- Hodgkinson, Will (2006). Guitar Man. Da Capo Press. ISBN 0306815141.
- Isler, Scott (1983). "The Stooges". In Robbins, Ira A. (ed.). The Trouser Press Guide to New Wave Records. Charles Scribner's Sons. ISBN 0684179431.
- Kent, Nick (2010). Apathy for the Devil. Faber & Faber. ISBN 978-0571258383.
- Rubin, Mike (1995). "Stooges". In Weisbard, Eric; Marks, Craig (eds.). Spin Alternative Record Guide. Vintage Books. ISBN 0-679-75574-8.
- Seward, Scott (2004). "The Stooges". In Brackett, Nathan; Hoard, Christian (eds.). The New Rolling Stone Album Guide (4th ed.). Simon & Schuster. ISBN 0-7432-0169-8.
