= Kill City =

Studio album by Iggy Pop and James Williamson
- Released: November 1977
- Recorded: 1974–75
- Studio: Maconnel (Los Angeles)
- Genre: Punk rock
- Length: 32:00
- Label: Bomp!
- Producer: James Williamson

Iggy Pop chronology
Lust for Life (1977)	Kill City (1977)	TV Eye Live 1977 (1978)

James Williamson chronology
Kill City (1977)	Re-Licked (2014)

Singles from Kill City
- 1. "Consolation Prizes" / "Johanna" Released: 1977; 2. "Kill City" / "I Got Nothin'" Released: 1978

Kill City is a studio album by the American musicians Iggy Pop and James Williamson, both formerly of the rock band the Stooges. It was recorded as a demo in 1975 but released in altered form in November 1977 by record label Bomp!.

== Background ==
"Johanna" and "I Got Nothin'" were both performed live during 1973–74 by the Williamson-era Stooges. "Kill City" and "Johanna" were recorded live at Iggy's King Biscuit Flower Hour radio performance released on CD in the late 1987.

== Recording ==
Kill City was originally recorded around the end of 1974 or the beginning of 1975, following the disintegration of the Stooges, with the intention of being used as a demo tape to give to record labels in hopes of getting Pop a new contract as a solo artist. His vocals were recorded on weekends when he received permission to leave a mental hospital he was staying in at the time for treatment of his long-standing heroin addiction.

The original 1975 "demo" mix of the album remains unheard, with the exception of three tracks which have been released on various compilations (including A Million in Prizes: The Anthology and Original Punks): "Johanna", "Consolation Prizes" and "Kill City". These tracks sound markedly different from those on the final version of the album, with different guitar parts and, in the case of "Johanna", no saxophone.

Pop biographer Paul Trynka said that rock writer Ben Edmonds "played the first mixes to Seymour Stein in late January 1975".

== Releases ==
There would be no takers for the album until 1977 when, following the modest success of Pop's RCA Records solo albums The Idiot and Lust for Life, Williamson got an advance from Los Angeles independent label Bomp! Records to release the album, some of which was used to fund studio time to finish off the original recordings by adding overdubs and remixing.

The master tapes were lost shortly after the release of the original album and all subsequent CD releases were mastered from the original poor quality green vinyl pressing. This partly accounts for the somewhat muddy sound of the album.

In 2010, Williamson and engineer Ed Cherney remixed the album once more from the original multitracks. The resulting mixes formed a new version of the album, released on Bomp! on October 19, 2010.

== Reception ==
Professional ratings
Review scores
Source	Rating
AllMusic	3.5/5 stars
Blender	5/5 stars
Christgau's Record Guide	B
Drowned in Sound	6/10
Mojo	4/5 stars
Record Collector	4/5 stars
Sounds	5/5 stars
Spin Alternative Record Guide	6/10
Uncut	4/5 stars

=== Contemporaneous ===
Upon its release, Kill City was generally well received by critics. Nick Kent of New Musical Express called it "a great album".

=== Retrospective ===
Mark Deming of AllMusic called the album "a minor triumph", writing: "The music is more open and bluesy than on Raw Power, and while Williamson's guitar remains thick and powerful, here he's willing to make room for pianos, acoustic guitars and saxophones, and the dynamics of the arrangements suggest a more mature approach after the claustrophobia of Raw Power". Martin Aston of BBC Music praised the album, calling it "Iggy's most underrated album" and one that "helped him get back to real life". The Wire placed Kill City in their list of "100 Records That Set the World on Fire (While No One Was Listening)".

== Track listing ==
All songs written by Iggy Pop and James Williamson, except "Master Charge", by Williamson and Scott Thurston.

Side one

1. "Kill City" – 2:20
2. "Sell Your Love" – 3:36
3. "Beyond the Law" – 3:00
4. "I Got Nothin'" – 3:23
5. "Johanna" – 3:03
6. "Night Theme" – 1:20

Side two

1. "Night Theme (Reprise)" – 1:04
2. "Consolation Prizes" – 3:17
3. "No Sense of Crime" – 3:42
4. "Lucky Monkeys" – 3:37
5. "Master Charge" – 4:33

== Personnel ==
- Iggy Pop – vocals
- James Williamson – guitar
- Scott "Troy" Thurston – keyboards, bass ("Kill City", "Beyond the Law", "Johanna" and "Night Theme"), backing vocals, special effects, harmonica
- Brian Glascock – drums, congas, African beaters, backing vocals, guiro
- Steve Tranio – bass guitar ("Sell Your Love", "I Got Nothin'" and "No Sense of Crime")
- Tony "Fox" Sales – backing vocals, bass ("Lucky Monkeys" and "Master Charge")
- Hunt Sales – backing vocals, drums ("Lucky Monkeys" and "Master Charge")
- John "The Rookie" Harden – saxophones
- Gayna – backing vocals on "Night Theme"

Technical

- James Williamson – production, mixing
- Peter Haden, Tony Gottlieb – assistant engineers
- David Allen – album cover

== In other media ==
Iggy Pop appeared as himself, performing the album's title track, on the "For Cryin' Out Loud" episode of the Tales from the Crypt TV series that originally aired on May 22, 1990.
