= Brett Callwood =

English-American journalist

Brett Callwood is an English-American journalist, copy writer, editor and author, based in Los Angeles. He is the senior editor with Music Connection, and a former music editor with the LA Weekly. He was previously a reporter at the Longmont Times-Call and Daily Camera, the music editor at the Detroit Metro Times and editor-in-chief at Yellow Scene magazine.r

== Career ==
Callwood began his professional writing career in 1999 with the publication of a review of hardcore band dBh in the British music magazine Kerrang!.

Brett has contributed to a number of notable rock and heavy metal magazines, among them Classic Rock, Metal Hammer, Record Collector, Terrorizer, Alternative Press and Metal Edge. His work has also appeared in publications catering to alternative lifestyles and subcultures, such as Bizarre, tattoo magazine Skin Deep and horror magazine Fangoria, and musicians' magazines like Guitarist, Rhythm, Modern Drummer, Total Guitar, Acoustic and Bass Guitar. He has also been published in detroit.metromix.com and the Detroit Free Press. Most recently, he worked freelance for the OC Weekly, Denver Westword, SF Weekly, Tucson Weekly, and idobi Online Radio.

During the early part of 2010, he worked on the news desk at Crain's Detroit Business. In June 2010, he joined up with Driven Solutions, Inc, an advertising house, as a copy writer. In February 2011, he started work with Benzinga.com, a business finance website, as a staff writer. That came to an end in the Fall of 2012, when he started working full-time for the Metro Times newspaper in Detroit.

From June 2011 until June 2014, Brett had a weekly column in the Metro Times and a daily blog on MetroTimes.com called City Slang. At the Metro Times, he graduated from freelance writer and columnist, to business assistant, to staff writer, to his final position as music editor.

In August 2014, Callwood relocated to Colorado and began work at Yellow Scene magazine in Erie as an associate editor. He was promoted twice, to managing editor and then to the position of editor-in-chief.

In November 2015, he switched to the Daily Camera/Denver Post family to take the community reporter position at the Longmont Times-Call. As well as being published in the Times-Call, Camera and Post, this job saw him published in the Colorado Daily, Broomfield Enterprise, Hometown Weekly, and the Loveland Reporter-Herald. In that same month, he also began writing as a freelancer for Westword, Denver's alt weekly, and Out Front, a Denver-based gay publication.

In June 2016, Calllwood moved to Los Angeles and in February 2018 he started working as a music editor for the LA Weekly.

== Books ==
To date Callwood has authored two books, both biographies of groups instrumental in establishing the Detroit garage rock scene of the late 1960s to early 1970s. The first, MC5 biography Sonically Speaking, was published in the UK in 2007, with The Stooges: A Journey Through The Michigan Underworld following in 2008. Both were published in North America on Wayne State Press, in the falls of 2010 and 2011 respectively. The US edition of the book on The Stooges was renamed The Stooges - Head On: A Journey Through The Michigan Underground.

== Awards ==
His writing on a campaign for the Ferndale Police won eight awards at the D Show 2010.

Brett Callwood won consecutive SPJ (Society of Professional Journalists) Detroit awards in 2013, 2014 and 2015 for his features on Detroit musicians Ty Stone, Josh Malerman and the Insane Clown Posse respectively. He was voted "Best Blogger" by Metro Times readers in the 2014 "Best Of" polls.

In 2015, Brett won a First Place award in the Colorado SPJs for a feature entitled "Options in Education," designed by Jennifer Ho. He also oversaw and edited a company-second First Place award, written by Ryan Howe and designed by Trisha Himmler, called "From Light to End of Life," focusing on the subject of death.

He has placed First three times in the LA Press Club's Southern California Journalism Awards, with a further First place win at the LA Press Club's National Arts & Entertainment Journalism Awards. He has placed Second three times.
