= James Williamson (musician) =

American musician (born 1949)

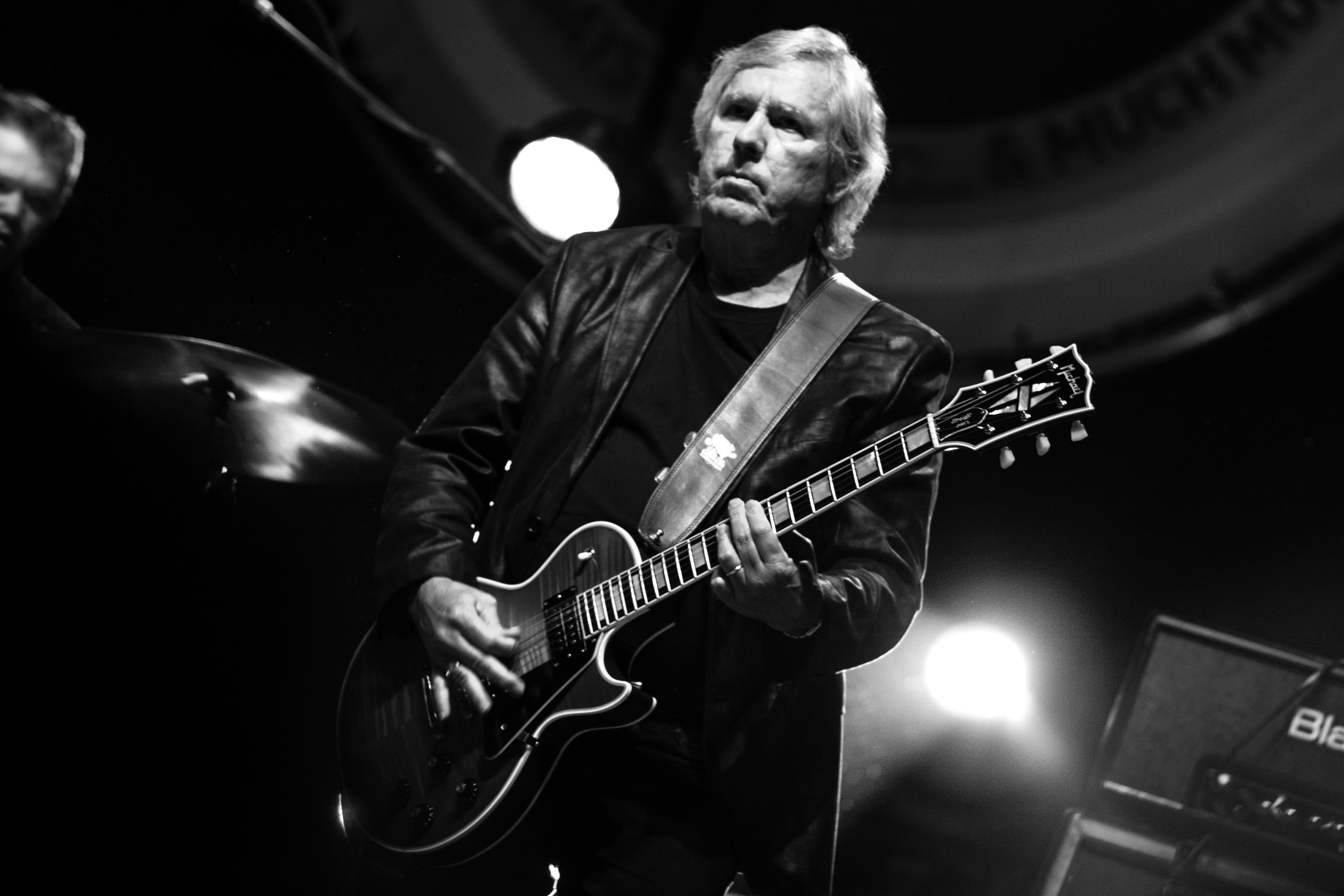
- Williamson performing with The Stooges in Brussels at the Brussels Summer Festival in 2012.

Background information
- Born: James Robert Williamson; October 29, 1949 (age 76); Castroville, Texas, US
- Genres: Proto-punk; garage rock; hard rock; glam rock; punk rock
- Occupations: Musician; songwriter; guitarist; producer; electronic engineer
- Instrument: Guitar
- Years active: 1966–1980; 2009–present
- Labels: Columbia; Bomp; Radar; Fat Possum; Leopard Lady
- Formerly of: The Stooges
- Website: straightjameswilliamson.com

James Robert Williamson (born October 29, 1949) is an American guitarist, songwriter, record producer and electronics engineer. He was a member of the proto-punk rock band the Stooges, notably on the album Raw Power and in the reformed Stooges from 2009 to 2016. Between his stints in music, Williamson worked in Silicon Valley developing computer chips. Most recently he has continued as a solo artist.

== Early years ==
Williamson was born in Castroville, Texas in 1949. His father died while he was young and he moved to San Antonio, Texas around the age of five. He began playing guitar in the 7th grade, while his family were living in Lawton, Oklahoma:

One summer while visiting Texas, I wound up getting a guitar because I thought it was cool. My sister was bringing home Elvis records and so I thought, 'I gotta have a guitar.' So I talked my mom into getting me one. My uncle worked for Sears, so I ended up with an old Sears f-hole guitar with action about an inch and a half off the fret board. Anyway, when I first learned to play guitar a little bit, it was just chords and stuff, but then about a year or so later we moved to the Detroit area, and it just so happened that I moved next door to a family that all played music. The son in that family, his name was Ken Black, taught me how to play chords better. He played electric guitar. I remember moving to Detroit—it was the summer when Martha and the Vandellas' "Heatwave" was a smash hit record. I would spend my days hanging over in his room, listening to him play and also learning how to play barre chords and things like that. By the end of that summer, I got good enough that I ended up getting my own electric guitar, which was a Fender Jaguar.

When Williamson was in the ninth grade in Detroit, he formed his first rock band, The Chosen Few, with schoolmate and future SRC vocalist Scott Richardson. They performed cover versions of the Rolling Stones' songs and others. Ron Asheton would go on to become the bassist in one of The Chosen Few's later line-ups. Despite this connection, the two were barely acquainted at the time, with Asheton recalling that "the first time I played with them, that was the last time James played with them. They met for the first time during a holiday break when Williamson attended a frat party gig where Asheton was playing ... Iggy was also there that night and so Williamson met both people that night and remained in touch afterward." As a guitarist, Asheton went on to form the Stooges with his brother Scott (drums), bassist Dave Alexander and Iggy Pop. Williamson also spent some time in a juvenile home after his stepfather had told him to cut his hair and Williamson refused. In the first half of 1966, Williamson was sent to a boarding school in a small town eighty miles north of New York City. While there, Williamson helped form and played lead guitar in the Coba Seas. During that time, the Coba Seas taped a rehearsal session, resulting in the first recordings of Williamson.

After graduating from high school in 1969, Williamson travelled to New York to keep in touch with the Stooges, who were recording their debut album with former Velvet Underground multi-instrumentalist John Cale.

== The Stooges ==
By late 1970, Williamson was invited to join the Stooges as a second guitarist. He performed his first gig with the band on December 5, 1970. The band were by then struggling with drug problems and a lack of commercial success; despite the injection of Williamson's musicianship, the Stooges couldn't overcome their difficulties. According to Williamson, "I got hepatitis and moved back to Detroit and basically the band completely dissolved." Many of the demo recordings made during this period were belatedly issued as vinyl singles or EPs, including the proto-punk tracks "I Got A Right" and "Gimme Some Skin".

In 1972, David Bowie offered Pop a chance to record in London; Pop promptly enlisted Williamson as a collaborator for the project. Having failed to find other suitable musicians during an intensive search, they eventually invited the Asheton brothers to join them and reformed the Stooges, with the elder Asheton reluctantly moving from guitar to bass. Ron Asheton would harbor a longstanding animus toward Williamson for several decades. In a 1997 interview with Perfect Sound Forever, he reflected upon his relationship with Williamson at length, alleging that "James was into bad stuff. He wasn't into junk at that time but he fell right in line with THE EVIL PROGRAM. He was supposed to be a helper for me but he totally usurped my position and eventually, kicked me out from playing guitar."

Despite these tensions, Williamson co-wrote all the songs with Pop and played all the guitar parts on the ensuing album, Raw Power (1973). He played louder and raunchier than almost anybody at the time, with a jagged high-energy approach. According to Williamson, "I was a very emotional guitar player, so I always played that way. That's how we felt, so that was what it sounded like." Asheton was less sanguine, noting that "James always loved Keith Richards and he even emulated him in his personal style and appearance. [Pop] finally got his Jagger-Richards. So he and Iggy were the songwriters. They wouldn't let me do nothing even though I would come up with pieces. Jim would actually almost go for something. Little suggestions I made for the tunes, little twists. Not that I did any major structural changes. But I did do pieces to enhance and I was never recognized for it or even a fuckin' 'thank you.'"

Nevertheless, Williamson's aggressive guitar playing on Raw Power has often been cited as a major influence on the emerging punk scene in the mid-seventies. Johnny Marr (the Smiths, Modest Mouse) has also lauded Williamson's abilities: "I'm his biggest fan. He has the technical ability of Jimmy Page without being as studious, and the swagger of Keith Richards without being sloppy. He's both demonic and intellectual, almost how you would imagine Darth Vader to sound if he was in a band."

Under new management from Jeff Wald (the husband and manager of pop singer Helen Reddy), The Stooges began a highly chaotic tour in February 1973 with little support from Columbia Records, which would soon drop the group after Raw Power only managed to peak at #182 in Billboard. During this period, minimalist composer and former Prime Movers keyboardist Bob Sheff joined as the group's pianist; he was soon replaced by multi-instrumentalist Scott Thurston, who formed an enduring friendship with Williamson. According to Kevin L. Jones, "[T]he kind of touring they did was not what you would imagine today, with big buses, fancy stage lighting and expensive equipment. Iggy and the Stooges toured like an invasive species, showing up at whatever venue would have them, scrambling for gear to play through and sucking up the drugs around them like walking Hoovers. Those days are remembered with stories full of blood from random projectiles being thrown at them and even a moment when Elton John jumped onstage wearing a gorilla costume, scaring the living daylights out of Pop." Williamson was briefly dismissed due to criticism from the band's management (likely related to his turbulent romantic relationship with Cyrinda Foxe, a friend of road manager Leee Black Childers); guitarist Tornado Turner replaced him for a single gig (on June 15, 1973 at the Aragon Ballroom) before he was permitted to return.

In February 1974, the Stooges disbanded as a result of their dwindling professional opportunities.

== After the Stooges ==
Williamson collaborated with Pop in 1975 on tumultuous demo sessions for a proposed new album to possibly be produced by John Cale, which were released (despite Pop's objections) in 1977 as Kill City. During this period, Pop was briefly institutionalized (of his own volition) under the auspices of the UCLA Neuropsychiatric Institute, while Williamson was arrested on charges of heroin possession by the LAPD. After sustaining a finger injury during a drunken altercation at an Alice Cooper listening party, he gave up playing music professionally to work as a record producer and pursue a career as an electronics engineer, initially enrolling in classes at Los Angeles City College: "The Stooges was maybe my only real band and kind of a family and so when that fell apart it was difficult to go on." Looking back in 2010, Williamson said, "I gave up being a Stooge to study calculus." He noted, "It was a rather large existential gap, but I did it."

Throughout the late 1970s, he worked on disco sessions as a staff engineer at Paramount Recorders in Los Angeles. In 1979, he was again persuaded to work with Iggy Pop as a producer and songwriter on New Values, his fourth solo album; in a partial reunion of the Stooges, Scott Thurston played guitar on all the tracks except "Don't Look Down."

Although Williamson continued to work with Pop on the initial sessions for Soldier (1980) in Wales, he brandished an air pistol and began to drink vodka heavily after failing to acclimate to the singer's new band, which included former Sex Pistols bassist Glen Matlock, Patti Smith Band multi-instrumentalist Ivan Kral and Barry Andrews of XTC. Following a squabble with Pop and David Bowie (who Williamson accused of exploiting the Stooges during the Raw Power era) over recording methods, he left the project. Subsequently, Williamson and Pop would lose touch for 30 years. Williamson reflected on the experience in 2015: "Fuck Bowie. His showing up was just the last of many frustrations with being there ... In hindsight, I should have never taken that job. It was recorded in a studio I didn't want to be in, with music that was half-baked and with musicians I didn't respect. It was my own damned fault it didn't work out."

After working on Soldier, Williamson left the music business entirely to concentrate on his studies. In 1982, he received an electrical engineering degree from California State Polytechnic University, Pomona.

== Technology career ==
Immediately following his graduation from Cal Poly Pomona, Williamson moved to Silicon Valley. For the next fifteen years, he worked for Advanced Micro Devices in San Jose, California, designing products around its chips. His coworkers never inquired about his earlier career as a rock musician; in a 2010 interview with Uncut, Williamson asserted that many of his colleagues were "nerds and geeks ... they don't listen to the Stooges much." In 1997, he was hired as Sony's vice president of technical standards; over the next decade, he liaised with competitors and helped to codify inter-operability norms for nascent products, most notably the Blu-ray Disc. During the Great Recession, he accepted an early retirement buyout offer from Sony in 2009.

In 2015, Williamson was selected to receive ANSI's Ronald H. Brown Standards Leadership Award for his contributions to consumer electronics standards development. The award, named after late United States Secretary of Commerce Ron Brown, is presented as part of World Standards Day celebration.

== Reuniting with the Stooges ==
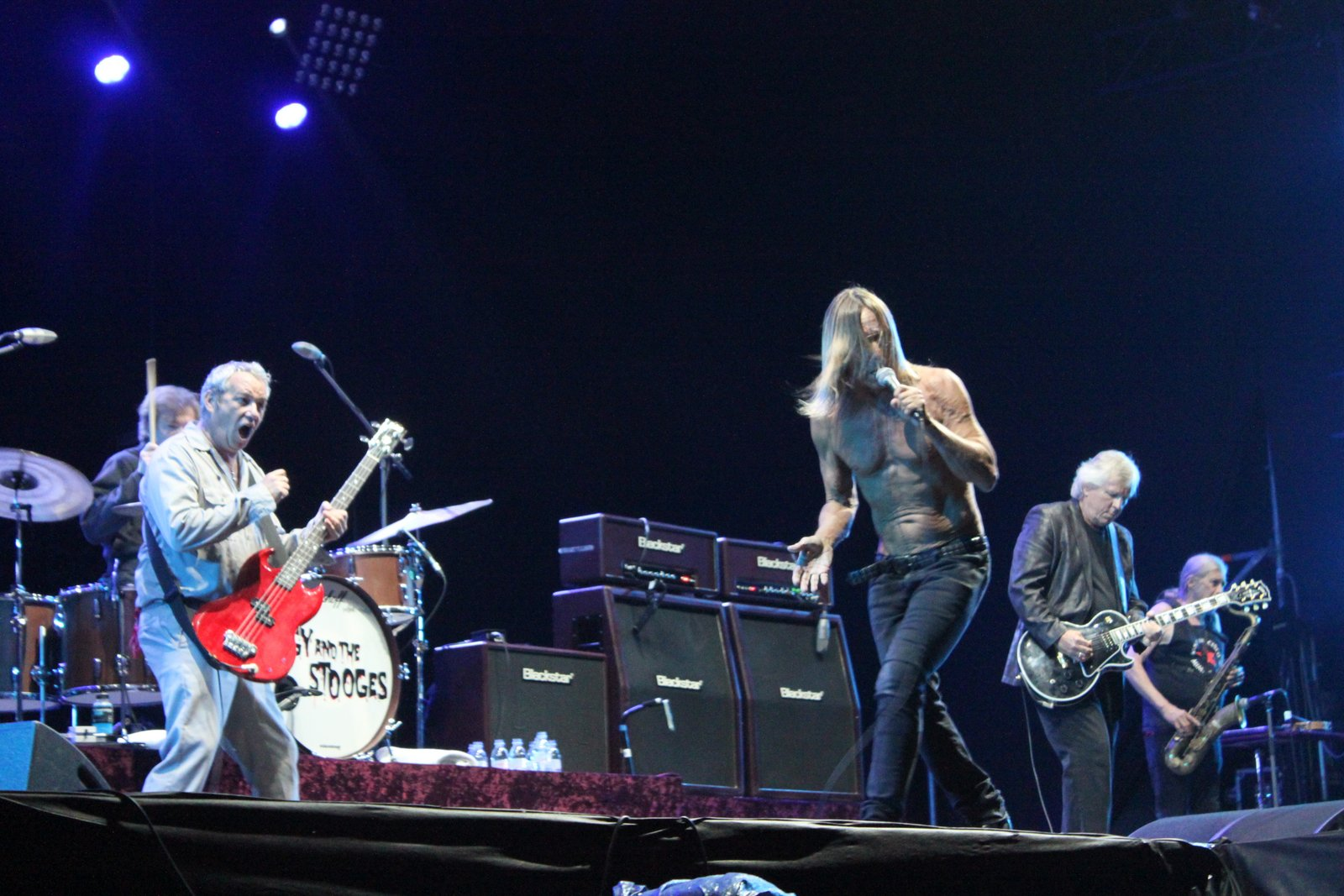
Iggy Pop and the Stooges, Katowice Off Festival, Poland, on August 4, 2012

Following Ron Asheton's sudden death in 2009, Williamson rejoined The Stooges, who had toured regularly after the Fun House-era lineup (save for Alexander, who had died years previously in 1975) reunited in 2003. To rehearse, he enlisted the help of local roots rock band Careless Hearts, who backed him on his first gig in 35 years at the Blank Club in San Jose, California on September 5, 2009. They performed a number of early Stooges songs, and also some material from the Kill City album. In June 2010, a CD + DVD combo was released of this event called James Williamson with Careless Hearts.

The Stooges' first reunion concert with Williamson occurred on November 7, 2009 in São Paulo, Brazil. The band added material from Raw Power and several of Pop's early solo albums to its repertoire.

In March 2010, the Stooges were inducted into the Rock and Roll Hall of Fame. The group's current line-up performed "Search and Destroy" with Scott Thurston.

Following several additional tours (many of which included full performances of Raw Power), the band released what would become their last album, Ready to Die, on April 30, 2013 via Fat Possum Records. Produced by Williamson, the album contained ten new Pop-Williamson compositions.

Re-Licked, Williamson's first solo studio album, was released by Leopard Lady Records in October 2014. Composed entirely of much-bootlegged songs by Pop and Williamson that were written, demoed and performed by the Stooges in the immediate aftermath of Raw Power, it featured vocal contributions from Jello Biafra, Bobby Gillespie, Ariel Pink, Carolyn Wonderland, Alison Mosshart and Lisa Kekaula along with performances by several members of the reunited Stooges (including bassist Mike Watt and touring drummer Toby Dammit). Pop did not participate in the project, with a representative alleging that "Iggy was never given an opportunity to participate on the album. He found out about the project in December of 2013 after it was rejected by a Chicago label." According to Williamson, "He gave me his blessing and wished me success. But it's a hard pill to swallow when someone is doing all your songs with your band and you're not on it. I think he's cool with it so far. We'll see how things progress ... I hope he maintains his positive attitude." In a subsequent interview with Rolling Stone, Pop said, "I don't have a problem with anything, I don't oppose anything. This statement about the 'hard pill' sounds kind of passive aggressive to me. The guys in the touring group have been phoning and emailing me and my rep before during and after the recordings, wondering how I felt about this. These guys are my friends and we've all worked together many years. I am glad someone is paying them; they are working musicians and they need to play. I want to thank all the wonderful singers on this record for covering my songs."

On March 15, 2014, Scott Asheton died of a heart attack at the age of 64. Saxophonist Steve Mackay (a short-term member in 1970 who returned for the post-2003 reunion and Re-Licked) also died in October 2015 at the age of 66. On June 22, 2016, Williamson issued an official statement for the band saying that the Stooges are no more: "The Stooges is over. Basically, everybody's dead except Iggy and I. So it would be sort-of ludicrous to try and tour as Iggy and the Stooges when there's only one Stooge in the band and then you have side guys. That doesn't make any sense to me." Williamson also added that touring had become boring, and trying to balance the band's career as well as Pop's was a difficult task.

== Writing ==
In 2024, James Williamson wrote the introduction to Iggy and The Stooges: The Authorized Biography by authorized Alice Cooper biographer Jeffrey Morgan.

== Equipment ==
Williamson is known primarily for his use of Gibson Les Paul Custom guitars, but he also plays other guitars live (although Les Paul Customs are his guitar of choice). Williamson says that all the songs on Raw Power were written in his London bedroom on a Gibson B-25 acoustic and the acoustic guitar used in the studio was a Martin D-28. A Vox AC30 amplifier was used for recording Raw Power. Williamson says he plugged his Les Paul Custom into the AC30's Top Boost channel, volume at full and bass low, and played primarily on the Custom's low-impedance (hand wired) bridge humbucker pickup; no effects pedals were used. Williamson often used Marshall amplifiers when playing live in the 1970s, and recently switched to Blackstar Amplification's Artisan 30 for live use. All guitars currently used onstage by Williamson are equipped with low-impedance, microphonic, humbucker pickups modeled after those in his original 1969 Gibson Les Paul Custom. These pickups were custom wound by Jason Lollar who reverse engineered the 1969 pickups, at the suggestion of James' touring guitar tech Derek See, and local tech Brian Michael. In concert, for "Gimme Danger" and "Open Up And Bleed", Williamson uses a Fishman Power Bridge piezo pickup equipped Les Paul (patched through a Fishman Aura pedal) for simulated acoustic guitar sounds.

A detailed gear diagram of James Williamson's 2011 Iggy and the Stooges guitar rig is well-documented:

== Personal life ==
Williamson lives in Saratoga, California with his wife Linda. He has a son named Jamie and a daughter named Elizabeth.

== Discography ==
=== Solo albums ===
- 2014 - Re-Licked

=== Solo EPs ===
- 2017 – Acoustic K.O.

=== Solo singles with various artists ===
- 2014 - I Got A Right /Heavy Liquid
- 2014 - Open Up And Bleed/Gimme Some Skin
- 2015 - Sickk/I Made A Mistake
- 2016 - Blues Jumped The Rabbit/Last Kind Words
- 2016 - I Love my Tutu/Never Far From Where The Wild Things Are

=== with the Stooges ===
- 1973 - Raw Power: Co-Song Writer, Guitars
- 1977 - Metallic K.O.: Guitars (live)
- 1995 - Open Up and Bleed: Guitars (live)
- 2013 - Ready to Die: Co-Song Writer, Guitars, Producer

=== with Iggy Pop ===
- 1977 - Kill City: Co-Song Writer, Guitar, Producer, Mixing
- 1979 - New Values: Producer, Guitar,
- 1980 - Soldier: Producer (uncredited)
- 2005 - A Million in Prizes: The Anthology

=== with Careless Hearts ===
- 2010 - James Williamson with Careless Hearts: Guitar

=== with the Coba Seas ===
- 2010 - (recorded in 1966) - Unreformed: Guitar

=== with Deniz Tek ===
- 2017 - Acoustic K.O.: Guitar, Producer
- 2020 - Two to One

=== with the Pink Hearts ===
- 2018 - Behind The Shade: Guitar, Producer
