= Spin Alternative Record Guide =

Reference book edited by Eric Weisbard and Craig Marks

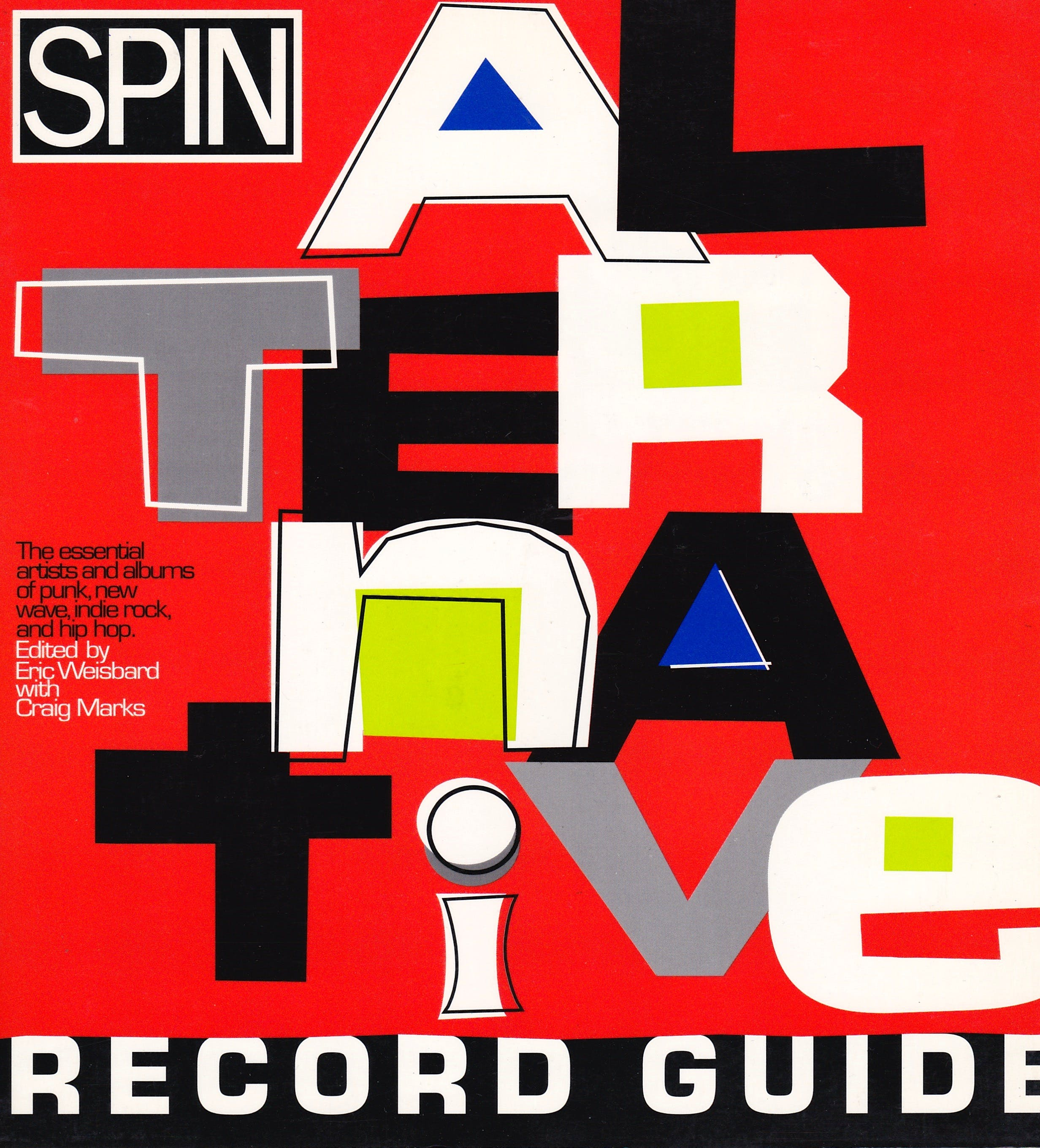
- Editors: Eric Weisbard and Craig Marks
- Authors: 64 contributors
- Language: English
- Subject: Alternative music, discography, music journalism, review
- Publisher: Vintage Books
- Publication date: October 1995
- Publication place: United States
- Media type: Print (paperback)
- Pages: 468
- ISBN: 0-679-75574-8

The Spin Alternative Record Guide is a music reference book compiled by the American music magazine Spin and published in 1995 by Vintage Books. It was edited by the rock critic Eric Weisbard and Craig Marks, who was the magazine's editor-in-chief at the time. The book has essays and reviews from a number of prominent critics on albums, artists and genres considered relevant to the alternative music movement. Contributors who were consulted for the guide include Ann Powers, Rob Sheffield, Simon Reynolds and Michael Azerrad.

The book did not sell particularly well and received a mixed reaction from reviewers in 1995. The quality and relevance of the contributors' writing were praised, while the editors' concept and comprehensiveness of alternative music were seen as ill-defined. Nonetheless, it inspired a number of future music critics and helped to revive the career of the folk artist John Fahey, whose music was covered in the guide.

== Content ==
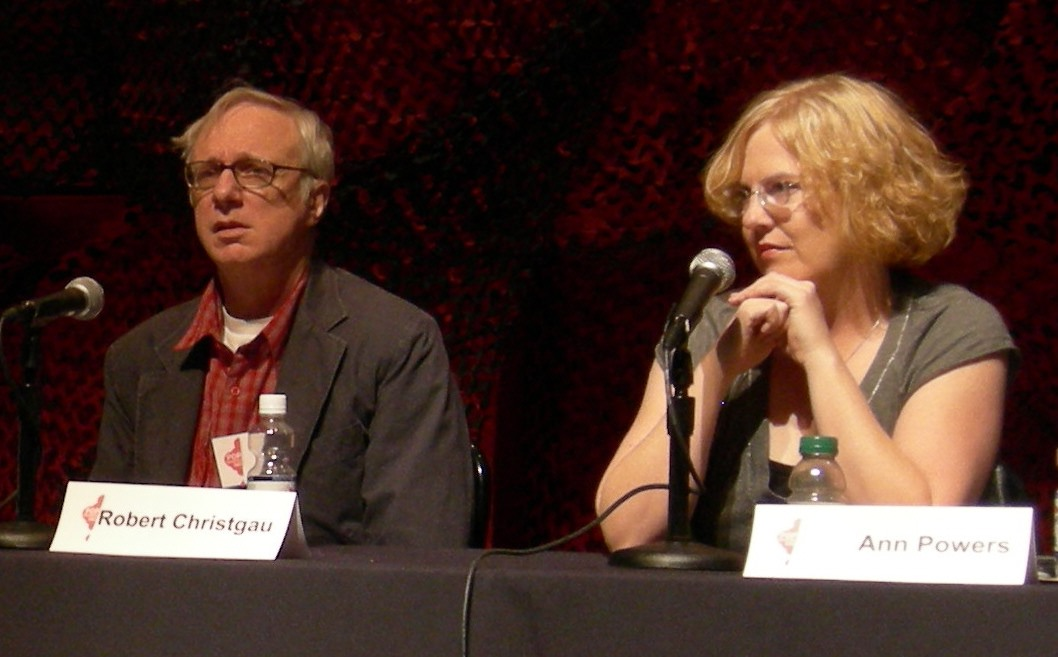
Ann Powers (right) contributed to the book, while Robert Christgau (left) loaned records from his personal collection to assist in the creation of the guide.

Spanning 468 pages, the Spin Alternative Record Guide compiles essays by 64 music critics on recording artists and bands who either predated, were involved in, or had developed from alternative rock. Each artist's entry is accompanied by their discography, with albums rated with a score between one and ten. Unlike the third edition of The Rolling Stone Album Guide (1992), which limited its discographies to albums currently in-print on CD, the Spin Alternative Record Guide offered more comprehensive album discographies. The entries are accompanied by album artwork.

The book's editors included contributions from noted journalists and critics such as Charles Aaron, Gina Arnold, Michael Azerrad, Byron Coley, Ann Powers, Simon Reynolds, Alex Ross, Rob Sheffield and Neil Strauss. Sheffield wrote the bulk of the guide's entries, while Powers "allowed her home to become command central on the book for many months". Though he did not contribute his own writing, Robert Christgau assisted in the creation of the guide by loaning out records from his personal collection as needed. (Note: Weisbard & Marks 1995, p. 455.)

The contributors curated an overall "Top 100 Alternative Albums" list in an appendix, ranking the Ramones' 1976 self-titled debut album at number one. A few dozen personal top-ten record lists from contributors and musicians are interspersed throughout the book. The musicians who provided their own top-ten lists are Mark Arm, Lori Barbero, Lou Barlow, Kurt Bloch, King Coffey, Digable Planets (members Craig "Knowledge" Irving and Mariana "Ladybug" Vieira), Tanya Donelly, Greg Dulli, Gordon Gano, Greg Graffin, Kristin Hersh, Georgia Hubley, Calvin Johnson, Jon Langford, Courtney Love, Barbara Manning, Mac McCaughan, Buzz Osborne (listed as King Buzzo), Joey Ramone, Jim Reid, Lætitia Sadier, Sally Timms, Steve Turner and Josephine Wiggs. (Note: Weisbard & Marks 1995, pp. 14 (Love), 33 (Barlow), 54 (Barbero), 69 (Dulli), 82 (Hubley), 91 (Irving), 106 (Osborne), 118 (Ramone), 132 (Manning), 149 (Sadier), 163 (Bloch), 178 (Arm), 193 (Donelly), 208 (Langford), 230 (McCaughan), 266 (Timms), 288 (Wiggs), 305 (Gano), 321 (Coffey), 335 (Graffin), 358 (Hersh), 374 (Johnson), 387 (Reid), 420 (Vieira), 436 (Turner).)

=== Scope and definition of "alternative" ===
Even by the standards of the time, the Spin Alternative Record Guide took an unusually inclusive approach to the boundaries of what "alternative" could mean. Before 1991, the genre "alternative rock" conventionally referred to post-punk and college rock. Within a few years, "alternative" had broadened into a catchall term for any rock bands outside the mainstream, regardless of their particular style — even as, paradoxically, "alternative" music became hugely popular and commercially successful. As a result, "alternative" was increasingly derided as a vague or even incoherent category.

As summarized by the scholar Gayle Wald, the book's introduction defined "alternative" rock as "an aesthetic that disavows, or evinces critical mistrust of, earlier rock subjectivities as well as the music industry itself". Rather than limiting its scope strictly within the musical genre of "rock" per se, the guide's coverage encompassed a wide range of non-rock artists who had adopted an anti-commercial stance or were aligned with a particular subculture. In an introductory essay titled "What Is Alternative Rock?", Weisbard explored the genre's origins and, more broadly, "alternative sensibilities" in other musical traditions. "Alternative rock lacks the proud boundaries that rock's original tradition kept so well guarded," he wrote:

More than jazz, blues, country, or any other musical genre, old-style rock was defined by a mass appeal you didn't have to sneer at, the mythic popularity of the universal youth music that turned the repressed fifties into the rebellious sixties ... Alternative rock, on the other hand, is still anti-generationally dystopian, subculturally presuming fragmentation; it's built on an often neurotic discomfort over massified culture, takes as its archetype bohemia far more than youth, and never expects that its popular appeal, such as it is, will have much of a social impact.

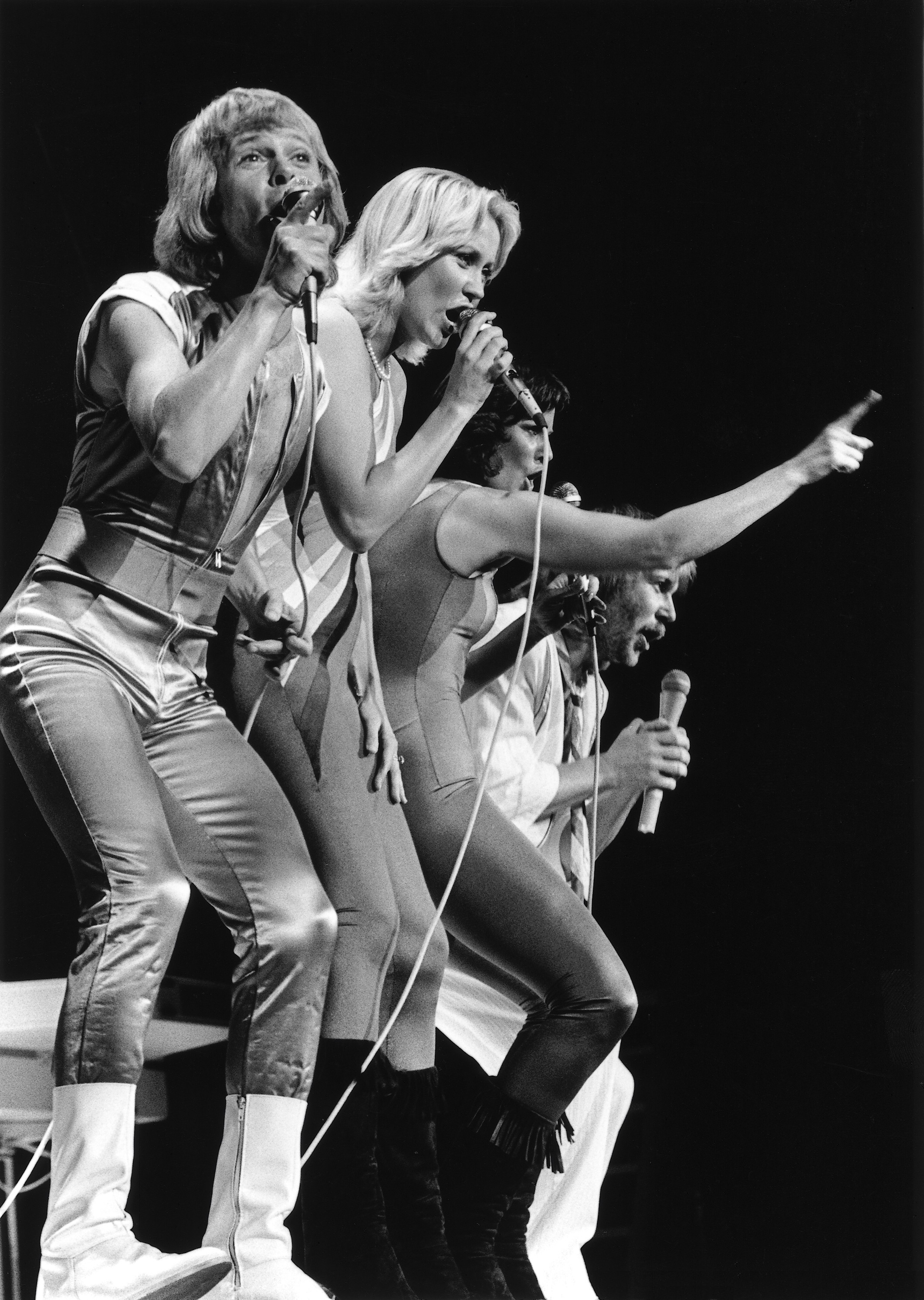
ABBA, 1979

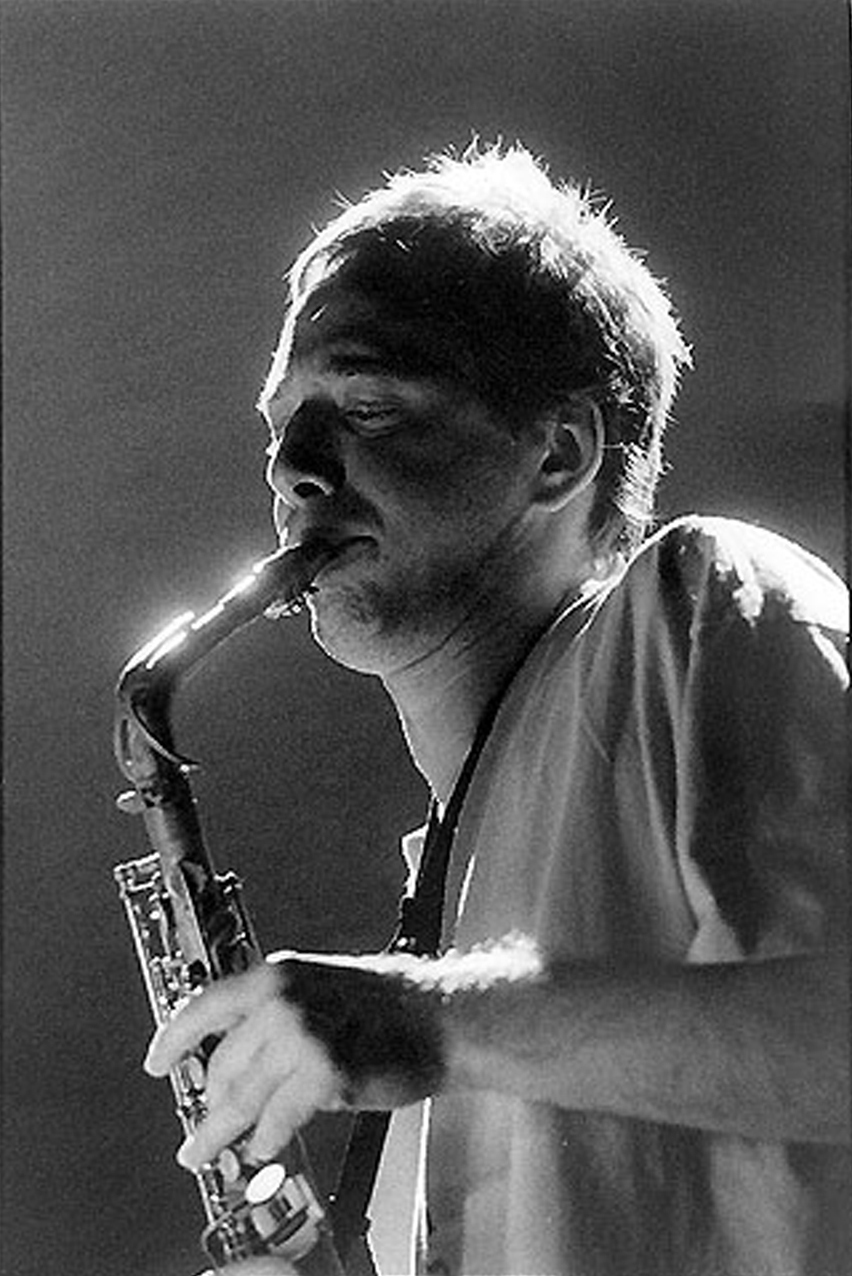
John Zorn, 2003

From A–Z: the 379 entries in the guide run alphabetically from the Swedish pop group ABBA to the American avant-garde saxophonist Zorn.

The book's selection of music was shaped by the generation gap between the baby boomers and Generation X. Marks said that he and Weisbard "saw [the book] as a way to give definition to second-generation rock 'n' roll". In this respect, the book was both intended and received as a generational counterpoint to The Rolling Stone Album Guide.

The guide has 379 entries in total. An entry in the book typically covers a single artist or band, a set of closely affiliated artists, a multi-volume series of various artists compilations or a selected discography representing an entire musical genre. Records in the guide were chosen from a variety of genres considered relevant to alternative music's development. These include 1970s punk rock, 1980s college rock, 1990s indie rock, noise music, reggae, electronic, new wave, heavy metal, krautrock, synthpop, disco, alternative country, hip hop, grunge, worldbeat and avant-garde jazz. Acknowledging the possibility that their selections and exclusions would be objectionable to some readers, Weisbard wrote in the introduction, "Not all these choices are defensible: As stated at the onset, alternative lacks strong boundaries. But we had to draw the line somewhere." Weisbard and Marks said the book was meant to be "suggestive" of alternative music, rather than "comprehensive".

Most artists associated with classic rock are excluded. For example, the guide omits the Beatles, the Beach Boys, Cream, Peter Gabriel, Jimi Hendrix, Led Zeppelin, Pink Floyd, the Rolling Stones, Van Halen and Frank Zappa — even though each of these artists meaningfully influenced "alternative" music to some extent. However, a handful of artists associated with the "classic rock" era can be found in the guide, among them Iggy Pop, Lou Reed, Neil Young and AC/DC.

A range of mainstream pop artists spanning a variety of styles are given entries, including Culture Club, Duran Duran and Lenny Kravitz. Some pop musicians are afforded prominent placement and a perhaps surprisingly high degree of acclaim. For instance, the very first alphabetical entry is the Swedish pop supergroup ABBA. Madonna's 1990 greatest hits album The Immaculate Collection is ranked as the 11th best alternative record. Other non-rock artists reviewed in the book include the jazz composer Sun Ra, the country singer-songwriter Lyle Lovett and the Qawwali singer Nusrat Fateh Ali Khan.

=== Rating system ===
The guide's 10/10 records by decade, not including compilations.
1. 1950s (2.20%)
2. 1960s (8.90%)
3. 1970s (35.8%)
4. 1980s (36.6%)
5. 1990–1995 (16.5%)

Records received a rating between one and ten points based on the judgment of the reviewer. A red dingbat beside a record's title indicated that it also appeared in the Top 100 at the back of the book. Several records in the Top 100 received a score lower than 10, while many records that received a 10 did not appear in the Top 100, because an individual reviewer's assessment could conflict with the list's collective consensus (and vice versa). (Note: Weisbard & Marks 1995, p. xii.) Still, there was some editorial oversight and control of the ratings, as Weisbard later explained:

I don't remember messing too much with what writers said. I remember Byron Coley wanted to give every single thing he wrote about practically a 10 [laughs], and I thought that was a little excessive, so I remember taking all of his number scores down a couple of pegs—and that's probably in some ways reflective of me not being as close to Byron Coley—but in most cases, I didn't worry about it too much. I have a vague memory of arguing with Rob Sheffield about giving Madonna's Immaculate Collection less than a 10 when we were going to put it in the Top 100 ... Rob is somebody who very much has his own vision of things, but has earned the right to have that. But so, if I remember correctly—and I might not, it's been twenty years—we let that one go and it's just a difference of opinion within the book.

==== Records that received a 10 ====
The following 172 records received the guide's highest score from the reviewer who rated the discography of the given artist, compilation series, or genre. A record with a 10 was deemed to be either "[a]n unimpeachable masterpiece or a flawed album of crucial historical significance". (Note: Weisbard & Marks 1995, p. xii.)

Key
†	Indicates a various artists compilation album; the name listed is either the name of the compilation series or the name of the record label.
#	Indicates the record is a compilation of either a particular artist or various artists.

Records assigned a score of 10 in the Spin Alternative Record Guide
Artist / series / label	Title	Year	Reviewed by	Ref.
ABBA	The Singles: The First Ten Years #	1982	Barry Walters	
ABBA	ABBA Gold #	1992	Barry Walters	
Air (Note: Sorted under "Threadgill, Henry".)	Air Lore	1979	K. Leander Williams	(Note: Weisbard & Marks 1995, p. 407.)
Albert Ayler	Spiritual Unity	1964	K. Leander Williams	
Albert Ayler	Nuits de la Fondation Maeght, Volume 1	1971	K. Leander Williams	
Beastie Boys	Licensed to Ill	1986	Rob Sheffield	
Beastie Boys	Paul's Boutique	1989	Rob Sheffield	
Beck	Mellow Gold	1994	Eric Weisbard	
The B-52's	The B-52's	1979	Johnny Huston	
Big Star	Radio City	1974	Eric Weisbard	
Big Star	#1 Record/Radio City #	1992	Eric Weisbard	
Big Star	Third/Sister Lovers	1978	Eric Weisbard	
Black Flag	Damaged	1981	Eric Weisbard	
Blondie	Parallel Lines	1978	Rob Sheffield	
Boogie Down Productions	Criminal Minded	1987	dream hampton	
David Bowie	Changesbowie #	1990	Rob Sheffield	
Buzzcocks	Singles Going Steady #	1979	Barry Walters	
John Cage (Note: Sorted under "Electronic Music/Musique Concrète".)	The 25-Year Retrospective Concert of the Music of John Cage	1994	Neil Strauss	(Note: Weisbard & Marks 1995, p. 123.)
John Cale	Paris 1919	1973	Ann Powers	
Can	Soon Over Babaluma	1974	Simon Reynolds	
Captain Beefheart	Shiny Beast (Bat Chain Puller)	1978	Jeff Salamon	
Cheap Trick	Cheap Trick	1977	Jim Greer	
Chic	Dance, Dance, Dance: The Best of Chic #	1991	Barry Walters	
The Clash	The Clash	1977	Rob Sheffield	
The Clash	The Clash [US version]	1979	Rob Sheffield	
The Clean	Compilation #	1986	Rob Sheffield	
Ornette Coleman	Something Else!!!!: The Music of Ornette Coleman	1958	K. Leander Williams	
Ornette Coleman	The Shape of Jazz to Come	1959	K. Leander Williams	
Ornette Coleman	Ornette!	1962	K. Leander Williams	
Ornette Coleman	Ornette on Tenor	1962	K. Leander Williams	
Ornette Coleman	The Unprecedented Music of Ornette Coleman	1968	K. Leander Williams	
Ornette Coleman	Dancing in Your Head	1977	K. Leander Williams	
Ornette Coleman	Of Human Feelings	1982	K. Leander Williams	
Ornette Coleman & Pat Metheny	Song X	1986	K. Leander Williams	
Elvis Costello	This Year's Model	1978	Bill Wyman	
Elvis Costello	2½ Years #	1993	Bill Wyman	
Descendents	Milo Goes to College	1982	Eric Weisbard	(Note: Weisbard & Marks 1995, p. 109.)
Descendents	Two Things at Once #	1987	Eric Weisbard	(Note: Weisbard & Marks 1995, p. 109.)
Dinosaur Jr.	You're Living All Over Me	1987	Rob Sheffield	(Note: Weisbard & Marks 1995, p. 113.)
The Disco Years series †	The Disco Years, Volume One: Turn the Beat Around (1974–1978) #	1990	Chuck Eddy	(Note: Weisbard & Marks 1995, p. 114.)
Joe Ely (Note: Sorted under "Flatlanders".)	Honky Tonk Masquerade	1978	Terri Sutton	(Note: Weisbard & Marks 1995, p. 148.)
The English Beat	I Just Can't Stop It	1980	Will Hermes	(Note: Weisbard & Marks 1995, p. 127.)
Brian Eno	Another Green World	1975	Ann Powers	(Note: Weisbard & Marks 1995, p. 128.)
Brian Eno	Brian Eno II: Vocal #	1993	Ann Powers	(Note: Weisbard & Marks 1995, p. 129.)
Brian Eno	Brian Eno I: Vocal #	1994	Ann Powers	(Note: Weisbard & Marks 1995, p. 129.)
Fairport Convention (Note: Sorted under "Thompson, Richard".)	Unhalfbricking	1969	Derk Richardson	(Note: Weisbard & Marks 1995, p. 405.)
The Fall	Slates	1981	Mike Rubin	(Note: Weisbard & Marks 1995, p. 143.)
The Fall	This Nation's Saving Grace	1985	Mike Rubin	(Note: Weisbard & Marks 1995, p. 143.)
The Fall	458489 A Sides #	1990	Mike Rubin	(Note: Weisbard & Marks 1995, p. 143.)
The Feelies	Crazy Rhythms	1980	Eric Weisbard	(Note: Weisbard & Marks 1995, p. 146.)
The Flesh Eaters	A Minute to Pray, a Second to Die	1981	Byron Coley	(Note: Weisbard & Marks 1995, p. 150.)
Flipper	Album – Generic Flipper	1981	Andy Newman	(Note: Weisbard & Marks 1995, p. 153.)
The Flying Burrito Brothers (Note: Sorted under "Parsons, Gram".)	The Gilded Palace of Sin	1969	Eric Weisbard	(Note: Weisbard & Marks 1995, p. 287.)
The Flying Burrito Brothers	Farther Along: The Best of the Flying Burrito Brothers #	1988	Eric Weisbard	(Note: Weisbard & Marks 1995, p. 287.)
Funkadelic (Note: Sorted under "P-Funk" (see also: Parliament-Funkadelic).)	Maggot Brain	1971	Mike Rubin	(Note: Weisbard & Marks 1995, p. 296.)
Funkadelic	The Best of the Early Years Volume One #	1977	Mike Rubin	(Note: Weisbard & Marks 1995, p. 296.)
Funkadelic	One Nation Under a Groove	1978	Mike Rubin	(Note: Weisbard & Marks 1995, p. 296.)
Funkadelic	Music for Your Mother: Funkadelic 45s #	1992	Mike Rubin	(Note: Weisbard & Marks 1995, p. 296.)
Gang of Four	Entertainment!	1979	Ivan Kreilkamp	(Note: Weisbard & Marks 1995, p. 163.)
The Go-Betweens	1978–1990 #	1990	Eric Weisbard	(Note: Weisbard & Marks 1995, p. 167.)
The Go-Go's	Beauty and the Beat	1981	Rob Sheffield	(Note: Weisbard & Marks 1995, p. 169.)
PJ Harvey	Rid of Me	1993	Ann Powers	(Note: Weisbard & Marks 1995, p. 177.)
PJ Harvey	To Bring You My Love	1995	Ann Powers	(Note: Weisbard & Marks 1995, p. 177.)
Hole	Live Through This	1994	Ann Powers	(Note: Weisbard & Marks 1995, p. 183.)
Michael Hurley / The Unholy Modal Rounders / Jeffrey Frederick & the Clamtones (Note: Sorted under "Have Moicy!", an entry about the album and the discographies of the affiliated musicians.)	Have Moicy!	1976	Craig Marks and Jeff Salamon	(Note: Weisbard & Marks 1995, p. 183.)
Hüsker Dü	Zen Arcade	1984	Eric Weisbard	(Note: Weisbard & Marks 1995, p. 187.)
Hüsker Dü	New Day Rising	1985	Eric Weisbard	(Note: Weisbard & Marks 1995, p. 187.)
Ice Cube	Death Certificate	1991	Michael Eric Dyson	(Note: Weisbard & Marks 1995, p. 189.)
The Jam	Sound Affects	1980	Rob Sheffield	(Note: Weisbard & Marks 1995, p. 195.)
Freedy Johnston	Can You Fly	1992	Eric Weisbard	(Note: Weisbard & Marks 1995, p. 201.)
Joy Division	Closer	1980	Evelyn McDonnell	(Note: Weisbard & Marks 1995, p. 203.)
Kronos Quartet	Morton Feldman: Piano and String Quartet	1993	Evelyn McDonnell	(Note: Weisbard & Marks 1995, p. 217.)
Fela Kuti	Zombie	1977	K. Leander Williams	(Note: Weisbard & Marks 1995, p. 219.)
Fela Kuti	Original Sufferhead	1984	K. Leander Williams	(Note: Weisbard & Marks 1995, p. 219.)
Fela Kuti	Army Arrangement	1985	K. Leander Williams	(Note: Weisbard & Marks 1995, p. 219.)
Fela Kuti	Original Sufferhead: Classic Fela #	1991	K. Leander Williams	(Note: Weisbard & Marks 1995, p. 219.)
Lyle Lovett	Pontiac	1987	Greg Sandow	(Note: Weisbard & Marks 1995, p. 229.)
Luaka Bop (label) (Note: Sorted under "Indestructible Beat of Soweto, The: Worldbeat Compilations".) †	Brazil Classics 1: Beleza Tropical #	1989	Will Hermes	(Note: Weisbard & Marks 1995, p. 192.)
Madonna	Like a Prayer	1989	Rob Sheffield	(Note: Weisbard & Marks 1995, p. 235.)
Meat Puppets	Meat Puppets II	1984	Rob Sheffield	(Note: Weisbard & Marks 1995, p. 247.)
The Mekons	Fear and Whiskey	1985	Eric Weisbard	(Note: Weisbard & Marks 1995, p. 248.)
The Mekons	Original Sin #	1989	Eric Weisbard	(Note: Weisbard & Marks 1995, p. 248.)
The Mekons	The Mekons Rock 'n Roll [UK version]	1989	Eric Weisbard	(Note: Weisbard & Marks 1995, p. 248.)
Mercury Records †	Electronic Music/Musique Concrète #	1979	Neil Strauss	(Note: Weisbard & Marks 1995, p. 123.)
Minor Threat	Complete #	1989	Terri Sutton	(Note: Weisbard & Marks 1995, p. 251.)
Minutemen	Double Nickels on the Dime	1984	Rob Sheffield	(Note: Weisbard & Marks 1995, p. 252.)
Mission of Burma	Mission of Burma #	1988	Rob Sheffield	(Note: Weisbard & Marks 1995, p. 255.)
Moby	Everything Is Wrong	1995	Charles Aaron	(Note: Weisbard & Marks 1995, p. 256.)
The Modern Lovers	The Modern Lovers	1976	Rob Sheffield	(Note: Weisbard & Marks 1995, p. 257.)
Motörhead	No Sleep 'til Hammersmith	1981	Jonathan Gold	(Note: Weisbard & Marks 1995, p. 258.)
My Bloody Valentine	Loveless	1991	James Hunter	(Note: Weisbard & Marks 1995, p. 263.)
New Order	Substance #	1987	Andrew Goodwin	(Note: Weisbard & Marks 1995, p. 267.)
New York Dolls	New York Dolls	1973	Andrew Goodwin	(Note: Weisbard & Marks 1995, p. 269.)
New York Dolls	Rock'n Roll #	1994	Andrew Goodwin	(Note: Weisbard & Marks 1995, p. 269.)
Nirvana	Nevermind	1991	Eric Weisbard	(Note: Weisbard & Marks 1995, p. 271.)
NRBQ	At Yankee Stadium	1978	Jim Walsh	(Note: Weisbard & Marks 1995, p. 274.)
NRBQ	Peek-A-Boo: The Best of NRBQ 1969–1989 #	1990	Jim Walsh	(Note: Weisbard & Marks 1995, p. 274.)
Nuggets series †	Nuggets: Original Artyfacts from the First Psychedelic Era, 1965–1968 #	1972	Byron Coley	(Note: Weisbard & Marks 1995, p. 275.)
N.W.A	Straight Outta Compton	1989	Greg Sandow	(Note: Weisbard & Marks 1995, p. 277.)
The Only Ones	The Only Ones	1978	Jim Walsh	(Note: Weisbard & Marks 1995, p. 280.)
The Only Ones	Special View #	1979	Jim Walsh	(Note: Weisbard & Marks 1995, p. 280.)
Parliament	Mothership Connection	1975	Mike Rubin	(Note: Weisbard & Marks 1995, p. 296.)
Parliament	Parliament's Greatest Hits #	1984	Mike Rubin	(Note: Weisbard & Marks 1995, p. 296.)
Gram Parsons	Grievous Angel	1974	Eric Weisbard	(Note: Weisbard & Marks 1995, p. 287.)
Gram Parsons	GP/Grievous Angel #	1990	Eric Weisbard	(Note: Weisbard & Marks 1995, p. 287.)
Pavement	Slanted and Enchanted	1992	Eric Weisbard	(Note: Weisbard & Marks 1995, p. 290.)
Pere Ubu	The Modern Dance	1978	Eric Weisbard	(Note: Weisbard & Marks 1995, p. 291.)
Pere Ubu	Dub Housing	1978	Eric Weisbard	(Note: Weisbard & Marks 1995, p. 291.)
Lee "Scratch" Perry	Some of the Best #	1985	Milo Miles	(Note: Weisbard & Marks 1995, p. 293.)
Pet Shop Boys	Introspective	1991	Rob Sheffield	(Note: Weisbard & Marks 1995, p. 294.)
Liz Phair	Exile in Guyville	1993	Rob Sheffield	(Note: Weisbard & Marks 1995, p. 298.)
Pixies	Surfer Rosa	1993	Eric Weisbard	(Note: Weisbard & Marks 1995, p. 301.)
Pogues	Rum Sodomy & the Lash	1985	Rob Sheffield	(Note: Weisbard & Marks 1995, p. 304.)
The Pretenders	The Pretenders	1979	Ann Powers	(Note: Weisbard & Marks 1995, p. 309.)
Prince	Dirty Mind	1980	Eric Weisbard	(Note: Weisbard & Marks 1995, p. 311.)
Prince	Sign o' the Times	1987	Eric Weisbard	(Note: Weisbard & Marks 1995, p. 311.)
Prince	The Hits/The B-Sides #	1993	Eric Weisbard	(Note: Weisbard & Marks 1995, p. 311.)
Public Enemy	It Takes a Nation of Millions to Hold Us Back	1988	Michael Eric Dyson	(Note: Weisbard & Marks 1995, p. 314.)
Public Image Ltd	Metal Box	1979	Simon Reynolds	(Note: Weisbard & Marks 1995, p. 315.)
Public Image Ltd	Second Edition	1980	Simon Reynolds	(Note: Weisbard & Marks 1995, p. 315.)
The Raincoats	The Raincoats	1993	Rob Sheffield	(Note: Weisbard & Marks 1995, p. 320.)
Ramones	Ramones	1976	Rob Sheffield	(Note: Weisbard & Marks 1995, p. 320.)
Ramones	Rocket to Russia	1977	Rob Sheffield	(Note: Weisbard & Marks 1995, p. 320.)
R.E.M.	Murmur	1983	Eric Weisbard	(Note: Weisbard & Marks 1995, p. 329.)
The Replacements	Let It Be	1984	Rob Sheffield	(Note: Weisbard & Marks 1995, p. 330.)
The Roches	The Roches	1979	Ann Powers	(Note: Weisbard & Marks 1995, p. 334.)
Roxy Music	Siren	1975	Rob Sheffield	(Note: Weisbard & Marks 1995, p. 336.)
Run-DMC	Raising Hell	1986	Eric Weisbard	(Note: Weisbard & Marks 1995, p. 338.)
Run-DMC	Together Forever: Greatest Hits 1983–1991 #	1991	Eric Weisbard	(Note: Weisbard & Marks 1995, p. 339.)
Sasha & John Digweed	Renaissance: The Mix Collection (Note: Sorted under "House Music All Night Long".) #	1994	Barry Walters	(Note: Weisbard & Marks 1995, p. 184.)
Sex Pistols	Never Mind the Bollocks, Here's the Sex Pistols	1977	Eric Weisbard	(Note: Weisbard & Marks 1995, p. 346.)
Shanachie (label) †	The Indestructible Beat of Soweto #	1985	Will Hermes	(Note: Weisbard & Marks 1995, p. 192.)
Sonny Sharrock	Guitar	1986	Mike Rubin	(Note: Weisbard & Marks 1995, p. 349.)
Sonny Sharrock	Ask the Ages	1991	Mike Rubin	(Note: Weisbard & Marks 1995, p. 349.)
Siouxsie and the Banshees	Once Upon a Time: The Singles #	1981	Joy Press	(Note: Weisbard & Marks 1995, p. 356.)
Slayer	Reign in Blood	1986	Greg Sandow	(Note: Weisbard & Marks 1995, p. 358.)
The Slits	Cut	1979	Joy Press	(Note: Weisbard & Marks 1995, p. 359.)
The Smashing Pumpkins	Siamese Dream	1993	James Hunter	(Note: Weisbard & Marks 1995, p. 362.)
Patti Smith	Horses	1975	Rob Sheffield	(Note: Weisbard & Marks 1995, p. 363.)
The Smiths	The Queen Is Dead	1986	Rob Sheffield	(Note: Weisbard & Marks 1995, p. 364.)
Sonic Youth	Daydream Nation	1988	Eric Weisbard	(Note: Weisbard & Marks 1995, p. 367.)
The Stooges	The Stooges	1969	Mike Rubin	(Note: Weisbard & Marks 1995, p. 378.)
The Stooges	Fun House	1970	Mike Rubin	(Note: Weisbard & Marks 1995, p. 378.)
Sugar Hill Records †	Old School Rap – The Sugar Hill Story (To the Beat Y'all) #	1992	Milo Miles	(Note: Weisbard & Marks 1995, p. 382.)
Sun Ra	Sun Song	1957	K. Leander Williams	(Note: Weisbard & Marks 1995, p. 386.)
Sun Ra	The Futuristic Sounds of Sun Ra	1961	K. Leander Williams	(Note: Weisbard & Marks 1995, p. 386.)
Sun Ra	The Magic City	1965	K. Leander Williams	(Note: Weisbard & Marks 1995, p. 386.)
Sun Ra	Sound of Joy	1968	K. Leander Williams	(Note: Weisbard & Marks 1995, p. 386.)
Sun Ra	Solo Piano	1977	K. Leander Williams	(Note: Weisbard & Marks 1995, p. 386.)
Sun Ra	Somewhere Else	1993	K. Leander Williams	(Note: Weisbard & Marks 1995, p. 386.)
Talking Heads	Remain in Light	1980	Jeff Salamon	(Note: Weisbard & Marks 1995, p. 394.)
Television	Marquee Moon	1977	Rob Sheffield	(Note: Weisbard & Marks 1995, p. 398.)
Richard and Linda Thompson	I Want to See the Bright Lights Tonight	1974	Derk Richardson	(Note: Weisbard & Marks 1995, p. 405.)
Richard and Linda Thompson	Shoot Out the Lights	1982	Derk Richardson	(Note: Weisbard & Marks 1995, p. 405.)
Henry Threadgill	Just the Facts and Pass the Bucket	1983	K. Leander Williams	(Note: Weisbard & Marks 1995, p. 407.)
Throwing Muses	Throwing Muses (1986)	1986	Evelyn McDonnell	(Note: Weisbard & Marks 1995, p. 410.)
A Tribe Called Quest	The Low End Theory	1991	Colson Whitehead	(Note: Weisbard & Marks 1995, p. 413.)
U2	Achtung Baby	1991	Ann Powers	(Note: Weisbard & Marks 1995, p. 422.)
Edgard Varèse	Poème Électronique	1990	Neil Strauss	(Note: Weisbard & Marks 1995, p. 124.)
The Vaselines	The Way of The Vaselines: A Complete History #	1992	Eric Weisbard	(Note: Weisbard & Marks 1995, p. 424.)
Caetano Veloso (Note: Sorted under "Tropicália".)	A Arte de Caetano Veloso #	1988	Will Hermes	(Note: Weisbard & Marks 1995, p. 414.)
The Velvet Underground	The Velvet Underground & Nico	1967	Eric Weisbard	(Note: Weisbard & Marks 1995, p. 424.)
The Velvet Underground	The Velvet Underground	1969	Eric Weisbard	(Note: Weisbard & Marks 1995, p. 424.)
The Velvet Underground	1969: The Velvet Underground Live	1974	Eric Weisbard	(Note: Weisbard & Marks 1995, p. 424.)
Violent Femmes	Violent Femmes	1983	Bill Wyman	(Note: Weisbard & Marks 1995, p. 427.)
Lucinda Williams	Lucinda Williams	1988	Craig Marks	(Note: Weisbard & Marks 1995, p. 432.)
Wire	Pink Flag	1977	Eric Weisbard	(Note: Weisbard & Marks 1995, p. 435.)
X	Wild Gift	1981	Rob Sheffield	(Note: Weisbard & Marks 1995, p. 438.)
X-Ray Spex	Germfree Adolescents	1978	Rob Sheffield	(Note: Weisbard & Marks 1995, p. 441.)
Young Marble Giants	Colossal Youth	1980	Eric Weisbard	(Note: Weisbard & Marks 1995, p. 446.)
Neil Young	Tonight's the Night	1975	Eric Weisbard	(Note: Weisbard & Marks 1995, p. 447.)
Neil Young	Rust Never Sleeps	1979	Eric Weisbard	(Note: Weisbard & Marks 1995, p. 447.)

== Publication and reception ==
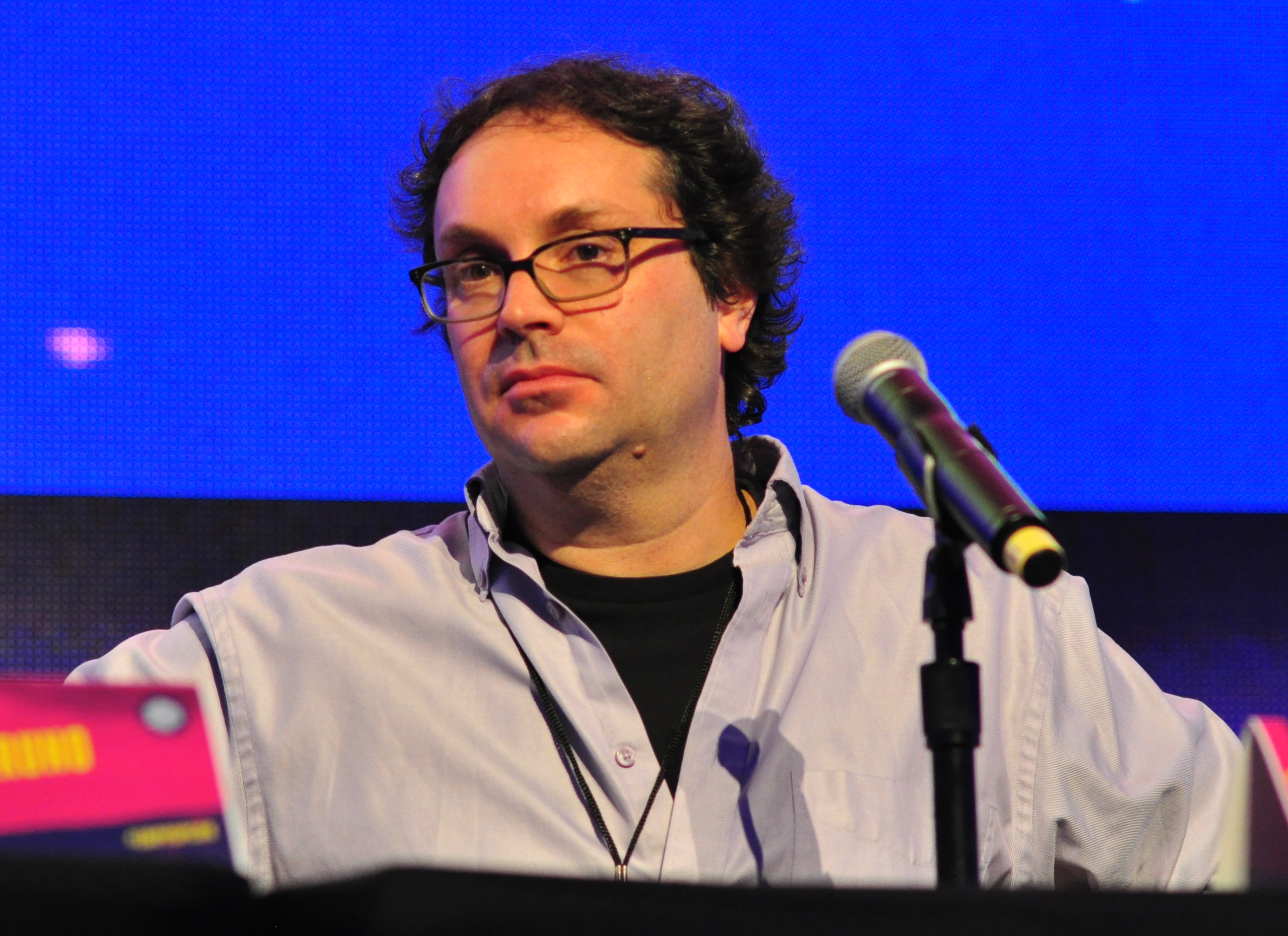
Co-editor Eric Weisbard at the Pop Conference in 2015

In October 1995, Vintage Books published the Spin Alternative Record Guide in the United States. (Note: Weisbard & Marks 1995, p. iv (copyright page).) It was the first book compiled by Spin. After nine years in the red, the magazine had its first profitable year in 1994. Looking to expand into other print media, its founder and publisher, Bob Guccione Jr., struck a deal to publish three books through Vintage. Its release was roughly timed to commemorate the magazine's 10th anniversary. The book's suggested retail price was US$20 (equivalent to $42 in 2025). The price was comparable with its competitors, with most music reference books priced at or below $25 in 1995. It was published simultaneously by Random House of Canada, where it retailed for CA$27.95 (equivalent to $52 in 2025). (Note: Weisbard & Marks 1995, pp. iv (copyright page), back cover (Canadian retail price listed at bottom-left corner).) According to Matthew Perpetua, the guide was reportedly "not a huge seller".

Reviewing the book in 1995, Adam Mazmanian from Library Journal recommended the Spin Alternative Record Guide to "both public and academic libraries". He found its reviews superior in "length and scope" to The Rolling Stone Album Guide (1992), which also offered complete discographies of artists ranging from Jonathan Richman to Throbbing Gristle. Mazmanian further argued that "this guide fills a gap in the literature of modern music" at a time when "alternative" has developed a ubiquitous presence in the marketing of popular music. In New York magazine, Kim France called it "a well-edited, unpretentious, and comprehensive look at all the crazy stuff the kids are listening to these days". Matt Kopka of Publishers Weekly wrote that Spin's guide "may be as close to a surefire hit as the season can offer".

The Booklist critic Gordon Flagg was more qualified in his praise. He applauded the accuracy of the artist entries and the quality of the contributors' reviews, but found Weisbard's conception of "alternative" ill-defined and recommended The Trouser Press Record Guide (1991) as a more comprehensive option. Even more critical was Billboard magazine's Beth Renaud, who called much of the writing biased and the organization unencyclopedic. She said Weisbard's "obligatory" essay is outdated and vague in defining alternative rock and that the contributors "gush" over artists usually covered by Spin's magazine publication, with many relevant artists omitted in place of more perplexing additions. In a 1999 survey of various music guides for the Riverfront Times, Jason Toon labeled the Spin Alternative Record Guide as a "must to avoid" and dismissed it as a "flimsy, shallow ... slicked-up cash-in job".

== Influence and reappraisal ==
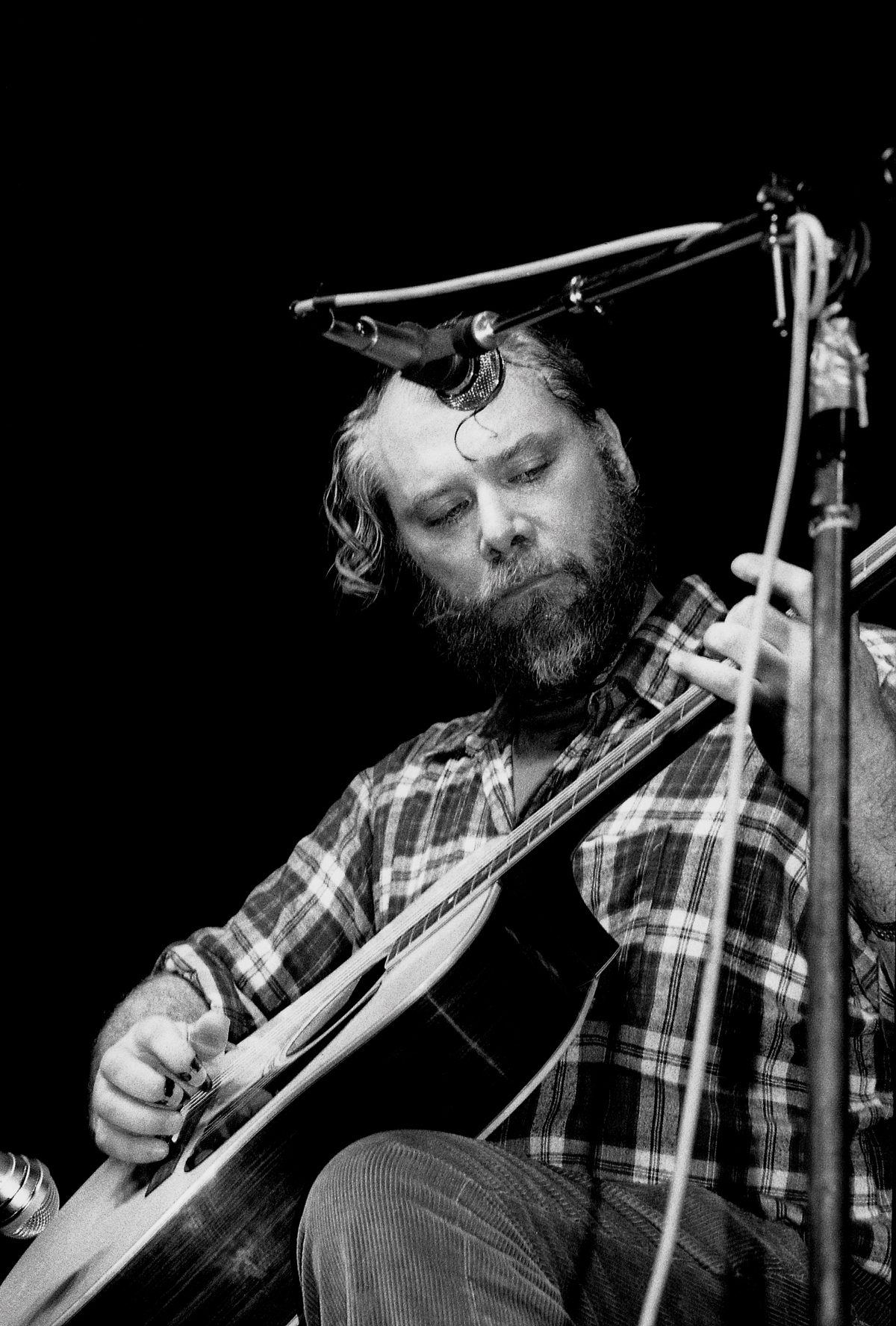
The guide's entry on John Fahey (pictured in 1984) helped revive the folk guitarist's career.

Having edited the book, Weisbard put his pursuit of a PhD at UC Berkeley on hold and accepted a job offer from Spin, which was the beginning of his career as a rock critic. Meanwhile, the guide's entry on the folk guitarist John Fahey introduced his music to a new generation of listeners. His entry in the guide was written by Byron Coley, who had previously profiled Fahey for Spin in 1994 at a time when the musician lived in reclusion and was commonly believed to be dead. According to Ben Ratliff at the New York Times, Coley's writings helped to revive Fahey's career by drawing renewed attention from record labels and the alternative scene. For his part, Fahey appreciated the guide's effect on his career and especially its association of his music with contemporary alternative subculture. With the arrival of a younger audience, Fahey felt vindicated in his long-standing misgivings about the marketing of his back catalog to an older demographic of listeners interested in traditionalist folk and new-age music. He wrote about the Spin guide in the liner notes of his 1997 album City of Refuge:

My category is alternative, period. I object to another categorization. ... For many years I was listed in the Schwann Catalogue [sic] under popular. That is a much more accurate category than folk or new age. But, the most accurate category is Alternative. If you will only take the time to read the spread on me in the 1995 Spin Alternative Record Guide ... and look at who is included in this book and who is not, and what it says about various people, then you will have a very clear understanding of what I have always tried to do. These people understand what I am doing more than any other group of people ever has.

The book has been cited as a bellwether of trends in critical consensus from the time of its publication. For example, the book's favorable treatment of ABBA marked a significant step in the revival of the band's reputation among critics. While ABBA had always been massively popular on an international scale, earlier critics had tended to dismiss their music as frivolous, unhip, or otherwise unworthy of serious attention. Conversely, the guide's omission of the English band Talk Talk — who had released commercially successful synth-pop before adopting an experimental approach on their last two albums, which were later seen as forebears of post-rock — signaled the low point of that group's reputation among American critics.

Personally, the book introduced me to a wide range of artists, gave me historical perspective, and got me hooked on a style of criticism that is extremely knowledgeable but also conversational and funny.

— Matthew Perpetua

The Spin Alternative Record Guide was a landmark in the construction of an "alternative canon", alongside The Trouser Press Record Guide and Martin C. Strong's The Great Alternative and Indie Discography. It exerted a major influence on the next generation of music critics. American pop culture critic Chuck Klosterman cited the Spin Alternative Record Guide as one of his five favorite books, saying in 2011, "I fear this might be out of print, but it's probably my favorite music book of all time. Since its 1995 publication, I doubt a year has passed when I didn't reread at least part of it." In response to a question from a 2019 interview with The New York Times Book Review, Klosterman named it as the one book he would require Donald Trump to read, providing no further explanation of his choice. Robert Christgau wrote that while most music guides and encyclopedia books were unremarkable, the Spin Alternative Record Guide was one of the few "useful exceptions" because of what he felt was the "sharpest writing" from contributors such as Weisbard and Sheffield. Idolator's Chris Molanphy, on the other hand, said in retrospect that the book's list of the 100 best albums catered to "hipper, Gen-Xier tastes".

In 2011, the Spin Alternative Record Guide was included in the Pitchfork staff's list of their favorite music books. In an essay accompanying the list, Perpetua said the book's writers — either top critics at the time or those who have since become important figures in music journalism — outline the "alternative sensibility" by recognizing and connecting music from disparate genres in "an inclusive, open-minded survey, but it's defined as much by what's left out — pretty much all Boomer-oriented rock — as what it includes". According to Perpetua, the "number of young readers [who] pursued music criticism" because of the book was far greater than the copies it sold. Matthew Schnipper, editor of The Fader, bought the book after it was published and said he used it as a consumer guide for ten years. Along with its influence on future critics, the book was cited by the guitarist William Tyler as his only source of music education growing up in the pre-Internet age, having found it in a bookstore around the time it was published. "They had entries for all these different people that I had never heard of: Can, John Zorn, [John] Fahey, whatever."

== Contributors ==
The full list of 64 contributors appears at the back of the book. (Note: Weisbard & Marks 1995, pp. 465–468.) Each write-up in the guide has a single author with the exception of the entry on the 1976 album Have Moicy! and its associated artists, co-written by Marks and Salamon. (Note: Weisbard & Marks 1995, pp. 179–180.) The table below notes the number of entries written by each contributor, as well as the number-one record on their top ten list (if one was provided).

Spin Alternative Record Guide contributors
Name of contributor	#	Top record choice		Ref.
Name of contributor	#	Title	Artist	Ref.
Charles Aaron	5	Nevermind	Nirvana	(Note: Weisbard & Marks 1995, pp. 256, 275 (top ten), 368–369, 417–418, 420–421, 437–438.)
Grant Alden	1	—N/a		(Note: Weisbard & Marks 1995, pp. 434–435.)
Steve Anderson	5	Marquee Moon	Television	(Note: Weisbard & Marks 1995, pp. 103–104, 110 (top ten), 165–166, 172–173, 180–181, 272–274.)
Gina Arnold	14	—N/a		(Note: Weisbard & Marks 1995, pp. 10–11, 34–35, 57–58, 80, 106–107, 116–117, 140–142, 150–152, 243–244, 286–287, 365–367, 377, 401–402.)
Michael Azerrad	1	Nevermind	Nirvana	(Note: Weisbard & Marks 1995, pp. 343–344, 411 (top ten).)
Jonathan Bernstein	10	The Lexicon of Love	ABC	(Note: Weisbard & Marks 1995, pp. 9, 223–224, 237 (top ten), 240–241, 340–341, 369–370, 376–377, 379–380, 419–420, 441–443.)
Jesse Berrett	1	—N/a		
Jason Cohen	1	Singles Going Steady	Buzzcocks	(Note: Weisbard & Marks 1995, pp. 64–65, 133–135, 212, 261–262, 324–325, 365 (top ten).)
Cheo Coker	2	—N/a		(Note: Weisbard & Marks 1995, pp. 130–131, 412.)
Byron Coley	11	—N/a		(Note: Weisbard & Marks 1995, pp. 25–27, 52–53, 58–61, 78–80, 139–140, 150, 157–158, 275–277, 322–323, 450–452.)
Carol Cooper	4	—N/a		(Note: Weisbard & Marks 1995, pp. 207–209, 214–215, 327–328, 403–404.)
Renee Crist	4	Slanted and Enchanted	Pavement	(Note: Weisbard & Marks 1995, pp. 98–99, 136–137, 245–246, 328 (top ten), 400–401.)
Michael Eric Dyson	2	—N/a		(Note: Weisbard & Marks 1995, pp. 189–190, 314–315.)
Chuck Eddy	3	Appetite for Destruction	Guns N' Roses	(Note: Weisbard & Marks 1995, pp. 114–115, 170–171, 244 (top ten), 279–280.)
S. H. Fernando Jr.	2	—N/a		(Note: Weisbard & Marks 1995, pp. 27–28, 418–419.)
Jen Fleissner	5	Wild Gift	X	(Note: Weisbard & Marks 1995, pp. 36–37, 50–51, 74–75, 312 (top ten), 353–354, 415–416.)
Lee Foust	1	—N/a		
Elysa Gardner	2	—N/a		(Note: Weisbard & Marks 1995, pp. 216–217, 226.)
Richard Gehr	1	Lick My Decals Off, Baby	Captain Beefheart and the Magic Band	(Note: Weisbard & Marks 1995, pp. 137–138, 297 (top ten).)
Jonathan Gold	3	—N/a		(Note: Weisbard & Marks 1995, pp. 24–25, 258–260, 370–371.)
Andrew Goodwin	2	—N/a		(Note: Weisbard & Marks 1995, pp. 267–268, 308.)
Jim Greer	2	—N/a		(Note: Weisbard & Marks 1995, pp. 80, 121–122.)
dream hampton	2	Ask Rufus	Rufus & Chaka Khan	(Note: Weisbard & Marks 1995, pp. 51–52, 251 (top ten), 359.)
Howard Hampton	1	—N/a		(Note: Weisbard & Marks 1995, pp. 302–303.)
James Hannaham	6	Entertainment!	Gang of Four	(Note: Weisbard & Marks 1995, pp. 46 (top ten), 86–88, 96–97, 221, 313–314, 335–336, 354–355.)
Will Hermes	7	The Velvet Underground & Nico	The Velvet Underground	(Note: Weisbard & Marks 1995, pp. 94–95, 127, 142 (top ten), 192–194, 350–353, 374–375, 414–415, 433–434.)
James Hunter	9	Gentlemen	The Afghan Whigs	(Note: Weisbard & Marks 1995, pp. 110–111, 133, 156 (top ten), 237–238, 242–243, 263–264, 307–308, 360–362, 444–445.)
Johnny Huston	6	Throwing Muses (1986)	Throwing Muses	(Note: Weisbard & Marks 1995, pp. 20–22, 38–39, 75 (top ten), 198–199, 209–210, 299–300.)
Frank Kogan	2	—N/a		(Note: Weisbard & Marks 1995, pp. 128, 155–156.)
Ivan Kreilkamp	5	Fear and Whiskey	The Mekons	(Note: Weisbard & Marks 1995, pp. 39–40, 118–119, 163–164, 343 (top ten), 392–393, 399–400.)
Bob Mack	1	—N/a		(Note: Weisbard & Marks 1995, pp. 323–324.)
Peter Margasak	1	—N/a		
Craig Marks	4	Wild Gift	X	(Note: Weisbard & Marks 1995, pp. 8 (top ten), 171–172, 174–175, 179–180, 432–433.)
Evelyn McDonnell	5	Easter	Patti Smith	(Note: Weisbard & Marks 1995, pp. 37–38, 201–203, 281–282, 318–319, 410–412, 429 (top ten).)
Rob Michaels	2	—N/a		(Note: Weisbard & Marks 1995, pp. 46–47, 342–343.)
Milo Miles	9	Soul Makossa	Manu Dibango	(Note: Weisbard & Marks 1995, pp. 7–8, 115–116, 125 (top ten), 182–183, 202–203, 206–207, 239–240, 285–286, 293–294, 382–383.)
Paul Miller	2	—N/a		(Note: Weisbard & Marks 1995, pp. 246–247, 283–284.)
Ed Morales	1	—N/a		
Andy Newman	3	—N/a		(Note: Weisbard & Marks 1995, pp. 153, 347–348, 390–391.)
Chris Norris	8	It Takes a Nation of Millions to Hold Us Back	Public Enemy	(Note: Weisbard & Marks 1995, pp. 101–102, 112, 158–160, 168–169, 210–211, 226–227, 259 (top ten), 265–266, 310.)
Ann Powers	14	Entertainment!	Gang of Four	(Note: Weisbard & Marks 1995, pp. 13–14, 42, 62 (top ten), 70–71, 117–118, 128–130, 161–162, 177–179, 183–184, 238, 278–279, 290–291, 309–310, 334–335, 422–424.)
Joy Press	7	Throwing Muses (1986)	Throwing Muses	(Note: Weisbard & Marks 1995, pp. 32–33, 105–106, 200 (top ten), 232–234, 356–357, 359–360, 381–382.)
David Prince	2	—N/a		(Note: Weisbard & Marks 1995, pp. 282–283, 396–398.)
Simon Reynolds	9	Fun House	The Stooges	(Note: Weisbard & Marks 1995, pp. 15–18, 43–44, 72–74, 145–146, 215–216, 315–316, 338, 380 (top ten), 383–384.)
Derk Richardson	1	—N/a		(Note: Weisbard & Marks 1995, pp. 405–407.)
Alex Ross	5	Terminal Tower: An Archival Collection	Pere Ubu	(Note: Weisbard & Marks 1995, pp. 38 (top ten), 217–218, 288–289, 395–396, 402–403, 439–440.)
Jeffrey Rotter	1	Taking Tiger Mountain (By Strategy)	Brian Eno	(Note: Weisbard & Marks 1995, pp. 122–123, 171 (top ten).)
Mike Rowell	1	—N/a		(Note: Weisbard & Marks 1995, pp. 385–386.)
Mike Rubin	6	Fun House	The Stooges	(Note: Weisbard & Marks 1995, pp. 53–54, 143–144, 222–223, 296–298, 349–350, 350 (top ten), 378–379.)
Jeff Salamon	7	—N/a		(Note: Weisbard & Marks 1995, pp. 75–76, 176–177, 179–180, 262–263, 332–334, 391–392, 393–394.)
Greg Sandow	4	—N/a		(Note: Weisbard & Marks 1995, pp. 190–191, 229–230, 277–278, 357–358.)
Rob Sheffield	54	Germfree Adolescents	X-Ray Spex	(Note: Weisbard & Marks 1995, pp. 4–5, 6–7, 23 (top ten), 28–29, 31–34, 47–48, 49–50, 55–57, 59–60, 62–63, 76–77, 84–86, 99–101, 108–109, 113, 119–120, 154–155, 162, 169–170, 186–187, 191–192, 195–198, 204–206, 224–225, 232, 235–236, 247–248, 252–255, 257–258, 294–295, 298–299, 304–306, 317–318, 320–322, 330–331, 336–338, 344–345, 348–349, 363–365, 389, 398–399, 438–439, 441, 443–444.)
Doug Simmons	1	—N/a		(Note: Weisbard & Marks 1995, pp. 269–270.)
Mark Sinker	1	The Modern Dance	Pere Ubu	(Note: Weisbard & Marks 1995, pp. 67–68, 222 (top ten).)
Natasha Stovall	5	Paid in Full	Eric B. & Rakim	(Note: Weisbard & Marks 1995, pp. 5–6, 16–17, 22–24, 196–197, 231, 282 (top ten).)
Neil Strauss	8	Forever Changes	Love	(Note: Weisbard & Marks 1995, pp. 123–126, 213–214, 266–267, 325–327, 371–373, 375–376, 404 (top ten), 408–410, 445–446.)
Terri Sutton	8	London Calling	The Clash	(Note: Weisbard & Marks 1995, pp. 98 (top ten), 147–150, 156–157, 175–176, 225–226, 251–252, 341–342, 373–374, 431.)
Stephen Tignor	1	—N/a		(Note: Weisbard & Marks 1995, pp. 345–346.)
Jim Walsh	3	The Clash	The Clash	(Note: Weisbard & Marks 1995, pp. 181–182, 216 (top ten), 274–275, 280–281.)
Barry Walters	5	Aladdin Sane	David Bowie	(Note: Weisbard & Marks 1995, pp. 65–66, 81–82, 131–132, 135–136, 185–186, 395 (top ten).)
Eric Weisbard	58	Zen Arcade	Hüsker Dü	(Note: Weisbard & Marks 1995, pp. 3–4, 9–15, 18, 30, 35–36, 40–41, 44–45, 48, 77–78, 83, 88–89, 92, 102–103, 104–105, 107–108, 109–110, 126, 144–145, 146–147, 165, 167–168, 187–188, 196, 200–202, 204, 228–229, 244–245, 248–251, 254–255, 260–261, 270–272, 287–288, 290–293, 301–304, 311–313, 329–330, 332, 338–339, 346–347, 355–356, 367–368, 380–381, 424–427, 430, 433, 435–437, 445 (top ten), 446–449.)
Colson Whitehead	6	—N/a		(Note: Weisbard & Marks 1995, pp. 30–31, 111–112, 164–165, 227–228, 300–301, 413.)
K. Leander Williams	5	—N/a		(Note: Weisbard & Marks 1995, pp. 19–20, 89–91, 219–220, 386–388, 407–408.)
Bill Wyman	5	—N/a		(Note: Weisbard & Marks 1995, pp. 71–72, 92–94, 421–422, 427–430.)

== See also ==
- 1,000 Recordings to Hear Before You Die
- Album era
- Christgau's Consumer Guide: Albums of the '90s
- Christgau's Record Guide: Rock Albums of the Seventies
- Christgau's Record Guide: The '80s
- Our Band Could Be Your Life
- Trouser Press

== Bibliography ==
- Ayers, Anne (October 10, 1995). "A guide for baby busters". Living. The San Bernardino County Sun. Gannett. p. D1 – via Newspapers.com.
- Christgau, Robert (October 2000). "Acknowledgements". Christgau's Consumer Guide: Albums of the '90s. New York: St. Martin's Griffin. pp. xvii–xviii. ISBN 0-312-24560-2 – via the Internet Archive (registration required).
- Conroy, Thomas M. (March 26, 2015). "In the marketplace of transgression: Throbbing Gristle and the pornographic imaginary". Porn Studies. 2 (1). Routledge: 96–99. doi:10.1080/23268743.2015.1013718.
- Fahey, John (February 11, 1997). City of Refuge (booklet). Portland, Oregon: Tim/Kerr Records. 644 830 127-2 – via the Internet Archive.
- Flagg, Gordon (September 1, 1995). "Spin Alternative Record Guide. Ed. by Eric Weisbard and Craig Marks. Oct. 1995. 480p. index. illus. Random/Vintage, $20 (0-679-75574-8). DDC: 016,78166". Booklist. 92 (1). Chicago: American Library Association: 51. Gale A17458987 (subscription may be required or content may be available in libraries).
- France, Kim (September 11, 1995). "Critic's Picks: For Those About to Rock". Preview. New York. 28 (36): 96 – via Google Books.
- Hermes, Will (2005). "Foreword: So, what's this 'alternative' music, you ask?". In Hermes, Will; Michel, Sia (eds.). Spin: 20 Years of Alternative Music: Original Writing on Rock, Hip-hop, Techno, and Beyond. New York: Three Rivers Press. pp. 12–13. ISBN 0-307-23662-5 – via the Internet Archive (registration required).
- Hurwitt, Sam (October 17, 1995). "The latest Spin on 'alternative'". San Francisco Chronicle. Archived from the original on September 13, 2020.
- Jones, Brian (December 2014). Signifying DIY: Process-Oriented Aesthetics in 1990s Alternative Rock and Hip-Hop (PhD). University of North Carolina at Chapel Hill Graduate School. doi:10.17615/atrc-jz34.
- Judge, Mark Gauvreau (January 15, 1996). "No Alternative". The Weekly Standard. 1 (18). New York: News America Publishing Inc.: 45–47 – via the Internet Archive.
- Klosterman, Chuck (October 2009). "ABBA 1, World 0". Eating the Dinosaur. New York: Scribner. pp. 147–158. ISBN 978-1-4165-4420-3 – via the Internet Archive (registration required).
- Klosterman, Chuck (October 24, 2011). "Chuck Klosterman Picks Five Favorite Books". The Daily Beast. Archived from the original on August 3, 2017.
- Klosterman, Chuck (July 18, 2019). "Chuck Klosterman Likes Writers Who Aren't Self-Absorbed Sociopaths". Sunday Book Review. The New York Times. Archived from the original on August 10, 2020.
- Kopka, Matt (October 16, 1995). "Accomplished performers: a guide to music guides". Publishers Weekly. 232 (42): 37. Gale A17606597 (subscription may be required or content may be available in libraries).
- Leonard, Marion (2007). Gender in the Music Industry: Rock, Discourse and Girl Power. Aldershot, UK: Ashgate Publishing. ISBN 978-0-7546-3862-9 – via Google Books.
- Lowenthal, Steve (2014). Dance of Death: The Life of John Fahey. Chicago Review Press. ISBN 978-1-61373-879-5.
- Maurstad, Tom (November 18, 1995). "Jumbled 'Spin Alternative' guide proves you can judge book by its cover". Section C: Community Extra. Times Leader. Wilkes-Barre, Pennsylvania. p. 3C – via Newspapers.com.
- Mayer, Andre (December 7, 1995). "Putting modern music through the Spin cycle". Varsity All-Review. The Varsity. University of Toronto. p. 6 – via the Internet Archive.
- Mazmanian, Adam (August 1995). "Spin Alternative Record Guide. Vintage. Oct. 1995. c.460p. ed. by Eric Weisbard. photogs". Book reviews: Reference. Library Journal. 120 (13). New York: 70 – via the Internet Archive.
- McLeod, Kembrew (January 2001). "'★½' [One and a Half Stars]: A Critique of Rock Criticism in North America". Popular Music. 20 (1). Cambridge University Press: 47–60. doi:10.1017/S0261143001001301. JSTOR 853694. S2CID 54869996.
- Molanphy, Chris (June 27, 2007). "Never Mind the Anglophilia, Here's The Queens Brothers". Idolator.
- Perpetua, Matthew (July 11, 2011). "The Spin Alternative Record Guide by Eric Weisbard and Craig Marks [Vintage]". Pitchfork. p. 3 in "Words and Music: Our 60 Favorite Music Books". Archived from the original on August 29, 2019.
- Perry, David (December 15, 1995). "Ideas for the music fan on your gift list". Entertainment. The Sun. Lowell, Massachusetts. p. 15 – via NewspaperArchive.
- Ratliff, Ben (January 19, 1997). "A 60's Original With a New Life on the Fringe". The New York Times. Archived from the original on May 27, 2015.
- Ray, Michael, ed. (2012). "Bibliography: Alternative Rock". Alternative, Country, Hip-Hop, Rap, and More: Music from the 1980s to Today. New York: Britannica Educational Publishing. p. 313. ISBN 978-1-61530-910-8 – via Google Books.
- Renaud, Beth (November 11, 1995). Applefeld, Catherine (ed.). "In Print". Reviews & Previews. Billboard. Vol. 107, no. 45. p. 7 – via Google Books.
- Roberts, Michael (November 15, 1995). "Alternative to What?". Westword. Denver. Archived from the original on September 13, 2020.
- Roberts, Randall (February 27, 2019). "Talk Talk's influential Mark Hollis, dead at 64, brought delicacy to 1980s music". Chicago Tribune. Archived from the original on June 3, 2019.
- Rotenier, Nancy, ed. (July 17, 1995). "Faces Behind the Figures: The 'Spin' doctor". Forbes. 156 (2). New York: 98 – via the Internet Archive.
- Rubio, Steven (1998). "Home Page". In The Bad Subjects Production Team (ed.). Bad Subjects: Political Education for Everyday Life. New York University Press. pp. 152–160. ISBN 0-8147-5792-8 – via the Internet Archive (registration required).
- Schaefer, John (April 18, 2013). "William Tyler: Trance-Inducing Fingerpicking, In the Studio". Soundcheck. WNYC Studios.
- Schnipper, Matthew (February–March 2013). "Editor's Letter". The Fader (84). New York. Archived from the original on July 8, 2015.
- Sinker, Mark (June 1996). "Faith No More". The Wire (148). London: 21–24 – via Exact Editions (subscription required).
- Thompson, Jay Aquinas (October 30, 2015). "Our Criticism Could Be Your Life: The Spin Alternative Record Guide, Twenty Years Later". Berfrois. London: Pendant Publishing. Archived from the original on December 23, 2017.
- Toon, Jason (July 21, 1999). "Rock Stock: A book report on the best tomes to consult before buying tunes". Riverfront Times. St. Louis. Archived from the original on July 29, 2020.
- Vincentelli, Elisabeth (2004). ABBA Gold. 33⅓. Vol. 7. New York & London: Continuum International Publishing Group. ISBN 978-1-4411-6789-7 – via Google Books.
- Vowell, Sarah (March 14, 1996). "Underground Roots". Chicago Reader. Archived from the original on April 26, 2020.
- Wald, Gayle (Spring 1998). "Just a Girl? Rock Music, Feminism, and the Cultural Construction of Female Youth". Signs. 23 (3). University of Chicago Press: 585–610. doi:10.1086/495280. JSTOR 3175302. S2CID 54932915.
- Walser, Robert (1998). "The rock and roll era". In Nicholls, David (ed.). The Cambridge History of American Music. Cambridge University Press. pp. 345–387. doi:10.1017/CHOL9780521454292.014. ISBN 0-521-45429-8.
- Weisbard, Eric; Marks, Craig, eds. (1995). Spin Alternative Record Guide. New York: Vintage Books. ISBN 0-679-75574-8.
