= Rotter =

Rotter or Rotters may refer to:

== People ==
=== Surname ===
- Ariel Rotter (born 1973), Argentine film director and screenwriter
- Elizabeth Neff Walker, a pen name of Elizabeth Rotter, American writer of romance novels
- Emília Rotter (1906–2003), Hungarian pairs figure skater
- Jeffrey Rotter, American writer
- Jerzy Rzedowski Rotter (1926–2023), Polish-born Mexican botanist
- Julian Rotter (1916–2014), American psychologist
- Lajos Rotter (1901–1983), Hungarian engineer, pilot and aircraft designer - see Rotter Karakán
- Oscar Rotter (1865-?), German-born New York physician and proponent of free love and contraception
- Rudy Rotter (1913–2001), American artist
- Stephen A. Rotter, film editor

=== Stage name ===
- Faris Badwan (born 1986), also known as Faris Rotter, English musician, former member of the pseudo-punk band The Rotters

== Fictional characters ==
- Junior Rotter, from the British comic strips Whizzer and Chips and Buster
- Mr. Rotter, a character from Wheel Squad
- Rotter, a recurring character in the British animated television programme Foxbusters
- Rotters, one name for reanimated dead people in The Walking Dead (franchise)

== Films ==
- The Rotters, a 1921 British comedy
