= Eric Weisbard =

American music critic

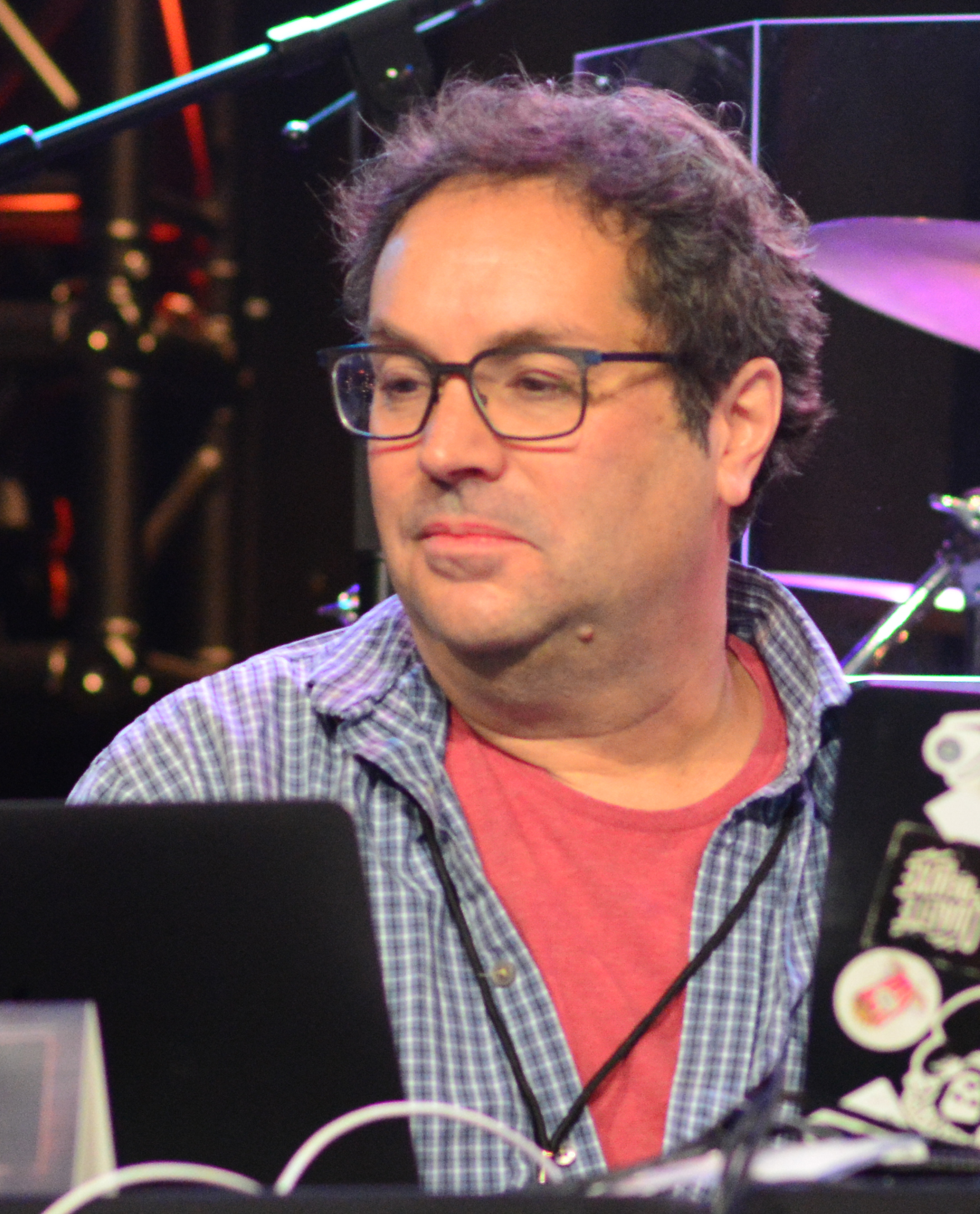
- Weisbard speaking at the 2025 Pop Conference
- Occupation: Music critic
- Known for: Pop Conference
- Notable work: Spin Alternative Record Guide; Top 40 Democracy
- Spouse: Ann Powers (m. 1998)

Eric Weisbard is an American music critic known for founding the Pop Conference, which for many years was hosted annually by the Museum of Pop Culture (formerly known as the EMP Museum), and which continues as of 2025 with other sponsors. He also organized the conference for many years.

== Career ==
Weisbard serves as professor of American studies at the University of Alabama. He is also the author of both a 33 1/3 book entry about Use Your Illusion and the 2014 book Top 40 Democracy: The Rival Mainstreams of American Music, and a former editor for Spin. With Craig Marks, he was also the co-editor of the Spin Alternative Record Guide, and has also written for the Village Voice. For Top 40 Democracy, he received the 2015 Woody Guthrie Award from the International Association for the Study of Popular Music's United States branch.

== Personal life ==
Weisbard is married to Ann Powers, a music critic for NPR. They were married in 1998.
