= Evelyn McDonnell =

American writer and academic

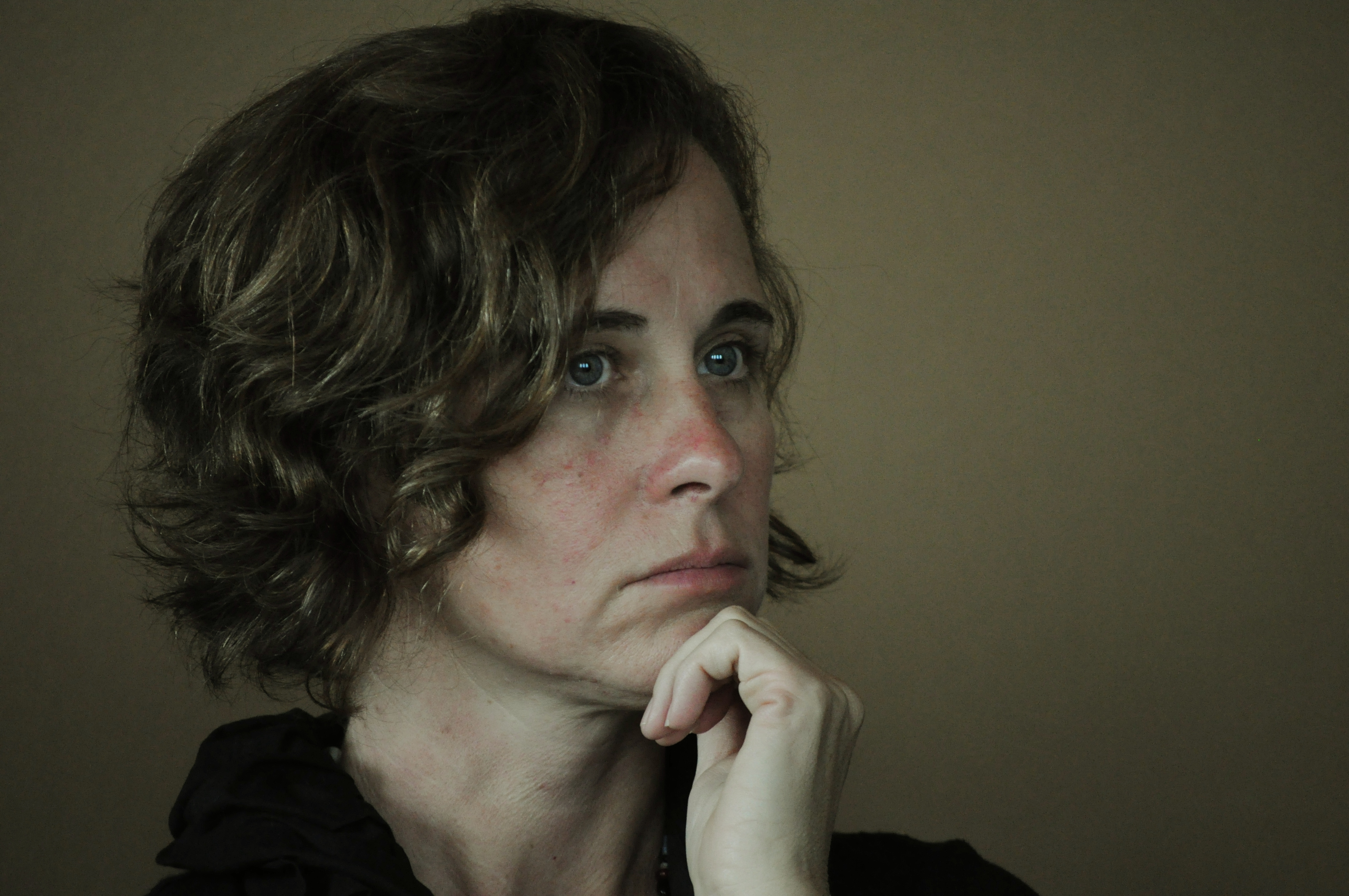
- Born: Glendale, California
- Education: Brown University; University of Southern California
- Occupations: Writer, academic
- Writing career
- Period: 1989–present
- Genres: Memoir, non-fiction
- Notable awards: Annenberg Fellowship; NEA Arts Journalism Fellowship
- Website: populismblog.wordpress.com

Evelyn McDonnell is an American writer and academic. Writing primarily about popular culture, music, and society, she "helped to forge a new kind of feminism for her generation." She is associate professor of journalism and new media at Loyola Marymount University.

== Early life and education ==
McDonnell was born in Glendale, California and grew up in Beloit, Wisconsin. She was "weaned on the Jackson 5 and the women's movement." Her first concert experiences were with her family at the Milwaukee Summerfest, where she saw Dave Brubeck, Journey and Squeeze. As a teenager, she listened to Iggy Pop and Patti Smith, and would drive to Chicago for shows by artists including New Order and the Dead Kennedys. She attended Brown University and graduated with a BA in American History. In 2010, she earned a master's degree in Specialized Journalism, the Arts, from the University of Southern California, Annenberg School.

== Career ==
=== Newspapers, weeklies, magazines ===
In college, McDonnell began writing professionally, first for the Providence NewPaper and then for the Providence Journal. She was a contributing editor for the NewPaper from 1985 through 1989, and then the associate editor of the San Francisco Weekly. In 1996 she was named music editor for the Village Voice. That same year, she founded a fanzine, Resister, "a scholarly arts and literary journal for the masses, a fanzine for the mainstream, a magazine that's raw and sticky, not slick and glassy, a nuts and bolts guide to thought and expression." She was a pop culture writer and music critic for The Miami Herald from 2001 to 2007.

In the early 90s McDonnell freelanced for publications including Rolling Stone, Spin, Ms., The New York Times, and Billboard. She wrote frequently about bands and musicians associated with the underground feminist punk movement, Riot Grrrl, and was a founding member of Strong Women in Music (SWIM), an activist group supporting women on all music-industry levels. McDonnell wrote: "It was the early '90s, when direct activism, identity politics, hip-hop, and grunge were driving forces of the dawn of the Clinton era. We were a new breed of woman whom pundits, including some in our own ranks, struggled to name: postfeminists, womanists, Riot Grrrls, pro-sex feminists, do-me feminists (a name obviously thought up by a men's magazine), third-wave feminists, lipstick lesbians, bitches with attitudes."

=== Books ===
McDonnell and Ann Powers co-edited Rock She Wrote: Women Write About Rock, Pop, and Rap, published in 1995. An anthology of women's writing on music from the 1960s to the time of the book's publication, it compiled "exciting evidence of women writers' inroads made over the past three decades into the still male-dominated field of popular music criticism."

McDonnell worked with Jonathan Larson on Rent by Jonathan Larsen, an account of the creation of the rock opera Rent. She conducted interviews and wrote much of the text for the book, which was published in 1997. In a review, Entertainment Weekly wrote "It’s not at all surprising that a book on this show would be so sharp. What is surprising is that the book often seems more compelling and moving than the musical itself." In 1998, she co-edited Stars Don't Stand Still in the Sky : Music and Myth. Her book about Bjork, Army of She: Icelandic, Iconoclastic, Irrepressible Bjork, was published in 2001.

In 2009 McDonnell's "account of a life lived on the cultural and maternal cutting edge," Mamarama: A Memoir of Sex, Kids, & Rock 'n' Roll was published. It was followed by Queens of Noise: The Real Story of the Runaways in 2013.

McDonnell served as the editor of Women Who Rock: Bessie to Beyonce. Girl Groups to Riot Grrrl, which profiles more than a hundred pioneering women musicians. Written by female writers, with illustrations by women, it was released in October 2018. In the introduction to the book McDonnell wrote: “All the people in this book are rhythm movers: the musicians, the writers, the illustrators. They have not merely tried to fit into the grooves of popular music … but have jumped the beat. They are musicians who inspire and compel us, the editors, writers, and illustrators of Women Who Rock."

=== Academics ===
In 2009 McDonnell was awarded an Annenberg Fellowship to study Specialized Journalism, the Arts, at the University of Southern California. She received her master's in 2010. She is associate professor of journalism and new media at Loyola Marymount University.

== Personal ==
McDonnell is the stepmother of her husband's two adult daughters, Karlie and Kenda. She and her husband, Bud, live with their son Cole in San Pedro, California.

== Bibliography ==
- Queens of Noise: The Real Story of the Runaways, Da Capo Press; June 2013 ISBN 0738211079
- Mamarama: Mamarama: A Memoir of Sex, Kids, and Rock 'n' Roll, DeCapo Press; April 2009 ISBN 0738211079
- Army of She: Icelandic, Iconoclastic, Irrepressible Bjork, AtRandom; August 2001 ISBN 0812991508
- Stars Don't Stand Still in the Sky : Music and Myth, (editor, with Karen Kelly); NYU Press; December 1998 ISBN 0814747272
- Rent by Jonathan Larsen (with Larson, Katherine Silberger); Rob Weisbach Books / William Morrow, May 1997 ISBN 0688154379
- Rock She Wrote: Women Write About Rock, Pop, and Rap (editor, with Ann Powers); Dell; 1995, ISBN 0859652335
- Women Who Rock: Bessie to Beyoncé, Girl Groups to Riot Grrrl (editor); Black Dog & Leventhal; October, 2019 ISBN 978-0316558877
- The World According to Joan Didion; HarperOne; September 2023 ISBN 978-0063289079
