= Rudy Rotter =

American sculptor

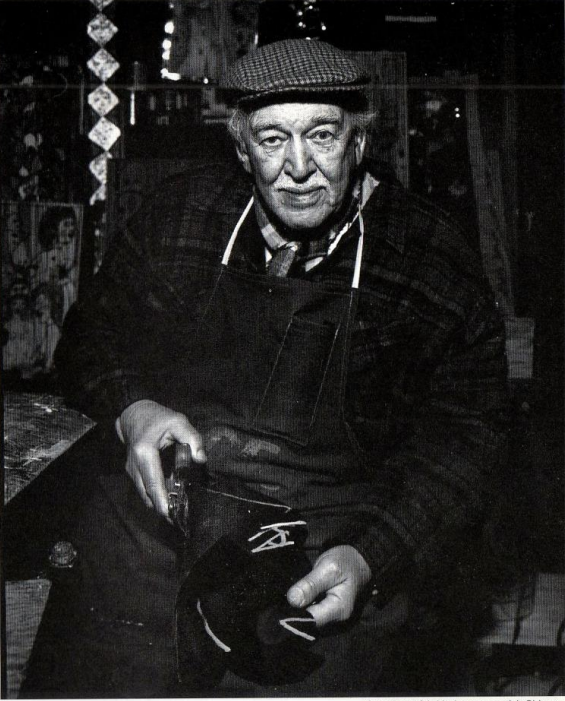
Rudy Rotter (1913-2001) in his warehouse studio.

Rudy Rotter (1913–2001) was an American outsider and self-taught artist residing in Manitowoc, Wisconsin. Raised in Milwaukee, he moved to Manitowoc after the War in the late 1940s to set up a dental practice. After settling in and starting a family, he embarked on a simultaneous career as an artist. In the following decades he produced a prodigious volume of art.

Upon retiring from dentistry in 1987, Rotter moved his artwork from the basement of his office to a large 100-year-old warehouse. As the warehouse filled with art, it was transformed into the self-designated Rudy Rotter Museum of Sculpture. Rotter created over 15,000 pieces of art over 45 years.

== Early life ==
Rudy Rotter grew up on the south side of Milwaukee in an Eastern European immigrant neighborhood as the youngest of six children. The family arrived at the turn of the last century, moving into a Polish-speaking neighborhood. There they built up seven small businesses before the Crash of 1929. Despite a setback during the Great Depression all the children achieved an education and entered the American mainstream. In high school, Rudy and his brother Peter became all-city football stars; an anomaly and special distinction for Jewish kids of their era. Rotter would later fashion his immigrant family experience into mythic-style tale which he then employed as the core conceptual structure of his art.

Prior to artmaking, in the early 1950s Rotter first began exercising his creative impulses as an inventor. His most notable accomplishment was inventing the first sugarless chewing gum. Other small inventions followed, but none became mature enterprises. By 1954 Rotter began to make art, a pursuit that would occupy all of his free time for the remainder of his life.

== Self-taught Outsider ==
As a self-taught artist Rotter worked outside of the norms and expectations of the traditional art community. Although generally aware of art history, he had no formal art training. Instead he relied upon his inner muse to provide the substance and style of his art. Commercial success was not a driver. Rather he possessed an inner compulsion to create, which he did every day for decades.

Rotter's limited early involvement with art included a modeling stint for his sister's art classes while an athlete at the University of Wisconsin. In dental school in the early 1940s, he attended human anatomy classes which included dissection. This knowledge was leveraged decades later in his drawings and sculptures.

Rotter was the paradox of an educated man who created naïve self-taught art.

== 15,000 works of art and the Rudy Rotter Museum of Sculpture ==
Rotter believed that the practice of art required constant and diligent hard work and commitment, and through this effort would come forth meaningful art. His lifetime creation of 15,000 works of art gave him the designation as the most prolific artist in the state of Wisconsin and possibly the nation. His compulsive daily production eventually filled a 21,000 sq. ft. warehouse. This space became the self-designated Rudy Rotter Museum of Sculpture, which was sometimes considered an art environment unto itself.

Rotter's pieces range from large mahogany bas reliefs based on the Old-Testament, to miniature machetes of imagined temples, to seven-foot tall standing wood figures. He also created paintings on found and donated materials, small assemblages, and thousands of drawings with Japanese oil crayon, and later standard magic markers.

After Rotter's passing, and due to structural problems with the building, the museum was disassembled in 2011. The art was moved to another local location. In the process, a small portion of the collection was disseminated to various interested people and institutions in Wisconsin. The remaining art, which covered three floors of the warehouse was returned in 2015, but no longer set out in a curated and ordered state.

== Variety of styles – consistency of theme ==
Rotter began sculpting at the age of 43, making half-size human figures in clay. By the late 1970s he was sculpting teak bas reliefs from hardwood scraps provided by a local yacht builder. At this same time he was making small machetes of imagined grand monuments. His eclectic style was born out of his constant drive to create and experiment. He used found and scavenged materials. These often suggested new forms, formats, and ideas. Unusual materials included his sister's old mink coat, scrap leather, shiny trophy factory discards, wallpaper samples, thrift shop finds, commercial paper scrap, and more. In his last decade he added drawn images on to photographic prints.

Rotter employed a variety of styles over time. Although he expressed himself intuitively without preconceived notions of what he would produce, his work had a thematic consistency.

== Humanism – the family of man ==
The basis of Rudy Rotter's art is humanism. Rotter consistently invoked the theme of the nuclear family, and more broadly, the family of man. He used simplified images to express his strong feelings of interconnectedness, and the familial love and joy he recalled from his youth. To this well-grounded basic theme, he often added "imaginary creatures" and other surreal dreamlike expressions.

His archetypal figures are generally rendered in side or frontal view, and drawn efficiently with a limited number of lines and strokes. This basic method of depiction allowed for the figures to be both actors expressing the core human condition—while at the same time, and of equal importance, each artwork became a sophisticated abstract composition unto itself. The art both tells a story, and at the same time creates a visceral visual experience for the viewer.

== Obsessive production ==
Rotter had strong views on the process and philosophy of art making. To him the joy was found in the process of creating. The act of making was more important than the finished product. Since the act of making art was paramount, he did not self-critique his completed work. When a piece was finished, it was set aside and the next piece was begun. When asked what was his favorite piece, he'd answer "The one I'm working on now." This mode of continuous obsessive production is seen among many outsider artists.

Over the years none of his art was discarded. When the artwork began to completely fill the warehouse, he self-designated the space as the Rudy Rotter Museum of Sculpture; the scale and content of which fascinated and awed those who visited.

== From early to late period ==
Rotter's Early Period (1958-1989) sculptures and drawings are most often composed of entwined and physically interrelating figures. The usually unclothed figures are without the standard cultural references to time and place. Thus they become expressions of universal humanity.

With advancing age, Rotter's strength declined. This change lead to his Late Period (1990 – 2001) work when he transitioned from hard, heavy objects to light-weight materials. His supplies included collections of wallpaper samples, shiny metal trophy discards, commercial tile samples, and a variety of other found and thrift store acquired objects. This change of materials and a resulting more flexible manner of art making, lead to his works becoming increasingly abstract and playful.

The drawings and multi-material plaques from this Late Period are basic images with line and color rendered quickly. Each work is an interplay of literal subjects, crafted materials, and abstract formats. The artistic merits of each piece are as important as the content.

== Exhibition history ==
Beginning in 1958, Rudy began showing in local and state-wide locations, such as libraries, the Wisconsin State Fair, and local colleges. He donated work to public institutions throughout the City of Manitowoc. By 1978 he was in the exhibition entitled "Grass Roots Art: Wisconsin" at the Kohler Arts Center in Sheboygan, Wisconsin. He continued to show infrequently in small venues through the early 1990s.

In 1996, the Kohler Foundation acquired 100 pieces of Rotter's art for their permanent collection. In 2003 his work was included in "Remembrance and Ritual: Jewish Folk Artists of Our Time" at the Andrew Edlin Gallery in New York. Later in 2004, his drawings made with magic markers on photographs and prints were shown in "Create and Be Recognized: Photography on the Edge" at the Yerba Buena Center for the Arts in San Francisco, and published in a book of the same name. The Portrait Society Gallery presented Rotter's art in annual shows during his final decade. In 2019, the artist's work was displayed at the Outsider Art Fair in New York, and was featured in an article in the Folk Art Messenger's 2018 Fall/Winter edition.

Various institutions have recently added Rotter's artwork to their permanent collections. These include the Kohler Foundation, INTUIT of Chicago, Museum of Wisconsin Art, Haggerty Museum of Art, University of Wisconsin Green Bay, Rahr West Art Museum, and the American Visionary Art Museum in Baltimore.

While Rudy Rotter intermittently exhibited in small art shows, he believed his art was ignored at the level of recognition it deserved and was misunderstood by most. The Kohler Foundation acquisition near the end of his life provided the formal validation he long desired.

== The magic in the art ==
The gallerist Debra Brehmer of the Portrait Society Gallery of Milwaukee, WI, succinctly summed up the experience of entering Rudy's warehouse after his passing:

"To enter the warehouse, even in its present state, is to come in contact with a relentlessly committed spirit. Rotter believed that there was magic in the act of making things. To tap into these free forces of boundless potentiality, a realm without laws or limits, was to share in the fullest condition of humanity. The act of creating something, whether it was from a huge panel of mahogany or some cast off metal pieces from the local trophy factory, provided an avenue of access to a spiritually infused state. This is what unifies Rotter's extraordinarily diverse body of work.

For Rotter, it was clearly the act of making things that held the power, not necessarily the final "product" itself. Yet each piece acts a little like an icon or totem as it gently and often humorously emits material evidence of Rudy's belief in creativity, hard-work and human intimacy. 'Here,' Rudy seems to be saying with each piece, 'take this work of art and remember to value life.'"

Rudy Rotter continued to create art daily until his death in 2001 at the age of 88.

== Bibliography ==
- John Michael Kohler Arts Center (1996). Rudy Rotter: Mahogany To Mink – Perspectives Series
- Rajer, Anton (1998). Rudy Rotter's Spirit-Driven Art: The Odyssey and Evolution of an Artistic Vision | slide deck (lo res). Fine Arts Conservation. ISBN 0-9664180-0-X
- "Rudy Rotter in His Museum," YouTube video, duration 00:05:58ss, post by "Randy Rotter," 08/04/2016, created in 2000 by KCPT, https://youtu.be/HniYABKi4Ys
- Des Garennes, Christine (2002). Great Little Museums of the Midwest: Rudy Rotter's Museum of Sculpture. ISBN 978-1931599085 p. 50-51
- Taylor, Peggy (2003). The Uncertain Legacy of Rudy Rotter | html. The Outsider magazine, INTUIT magazine. p 17–21.
- Koplitz, Steve. Rudy Rotter – Biography, Wisconsin Museum of Art
- Turner, John and Klochko, Deborah (2004), Create and Be Recognized, Photography on the Edge. Intro by Roger Cardinal. ISBN 0-8118-4432-3 p 90-93
- "Rudy Rotter's 17,000 works of art". YouTube video, duration 00:02:38ss, post by Milwaukee Journal Sentinel (Mary Louis Schumacher), created 12-20-2016, https://youtu.be/HMFvcZOnnwY
- Andrew Edlin Gallery (2003): Remembrance and Ritual: Jewish Folk Artists of Our Time, New York, NY
- Fine, Gary Allan (2004), Everyday Genius - Self-taught Art and the Culture of Authenticity. Univ. of Chicago Press, ISBN 978-0226249513 pp. 116, 119, 263
- Krug, Don, Ann Parker, Roger Cardinal (2005). Miracle of the Spirit | html. ISBN 9781578067534. Univ. Press of Mississippi. p 53-61
- Sellen, Betty-Carol (2016). Self Taught, Outsider, and Folk Art – 2016. A Guide to American Artists, Locations and Resources. McFarland. ISBN 978-0786475858
- Rotter, Randy (2018). A Warehouse Full of Dreams. The Folk Art Messenger, Fall/Winter 2018. ISSN 1043-5026. p 8-11
