= Jeffrey Rotter =

Jeffrey Rotter is a writer. He has written for numerous publications, including The New York Times, Spin magazine, ESPN, McSweeney's, The Literary Review and The New York Observer. In 2006 he completed his MFA in fiction at Hunter College, where he studied under Peter Carey, Colson Whitehead, Colum McCann, and Andrew Sean Greer. At Hunter he was awarded a Hertog Fellowship to perform research for Jennifer Egan. A longtime Brooklyn resident, he lives with his wife and their son, Felix.

His first novel, The Unknown Knowns, was published by Scribner on March 17, 2009. The book is about a guy called Jim Rath who dreams of building a museum based on The Aquatic Ape Theory of human evolution while being chased by an agent from The Department of Homeland Security. Jim thinks the agent is an emissary from a lost aquatic race called Nautikons; the agent thinks Jim is a terrorist. They are both wrong.

Douglas Coupland calls The Unknown Knowns a "wonderful book - smart, tight, and funny - Confederacy of Dunces meets Linus waiting for the Great Pumpkin." And Booklist has called the novel a "Vonnegut-esque tale of delusion, violence and homeland security … a hyperintelligent, surrealistic tale with a wackiness factor worthy of Kilgore Trout."

His second novel, The Only Words That Are Worth Remembering, was published on April 7, 2015.
