= Steven and Chris =

- Genre: Talk show
- Starring: Steven Sabados; Chris Hyndman
- Country of origin: Canada
- Original language: English
- No. of seasons: 8
- No. of episodes: 500+

Production
- Production locations: Canadian Broadcasting Centre; Toronto, Ontario

Original release
- Network: CBC Television; (2008–2015); syndicated (2010–2011); Live Well Network; (2011–2015)
- Release: January 14, 2008 – July 16, 2015

Steven and Chris is a Canadian television talk show that aired on CBC Television from 2008 to 2015. The show was hosted by Steven Sabados and Chris Hyndman, formerly of the home renovation shows Designer Guys and Design Rivals, who host celebrity guests and talk about topics ranging from entertainment, cooking, fashion, health and home decor.

Sabados and Hyndman were both openly gay. Despite being a longtime couple off-screen, they did not publicly acknowledge their relationship until 2008. Steven and Chris is believed to have been the first daytime talk show in television history hosted by a married same-sex couple.

On March 10, 2009, CBC announced that the show was put on hiatus due to the network's budget cuts. It concluded on April 15, 2009 and continued in reruns in its usual timeslot. The show returned on December 10, 2009 with a prime time holiday special, and regular new episodes began on January 4, 2010.

The show debuted in syndication in the United States through Program Partners in the fall of 2010. In the fall of 2011, it began airing exclusively on Live Well Network.

Hyndman died on August 3, 2015. The circumstances and cause have not been fully disclosed. The day after his death, the CBC suspended production and temporarily withdrew the show from its schedule pending a follow-up announcement of whether the show would be permanently cancelled, or continue in the future with a new co-host.

On August 21, Sabados announced that he would not continue the show, resulting in its cancellation. However, repeat episodes continued to air on the network and on OutTV. In 2016, Sabados announced the new series The Goods, which he co-hosted with Jessi Cruickshank, Andrea Bain and Shahir Massoud.
