= ODB (wrestler) =

American professional wrestler (born 1978)

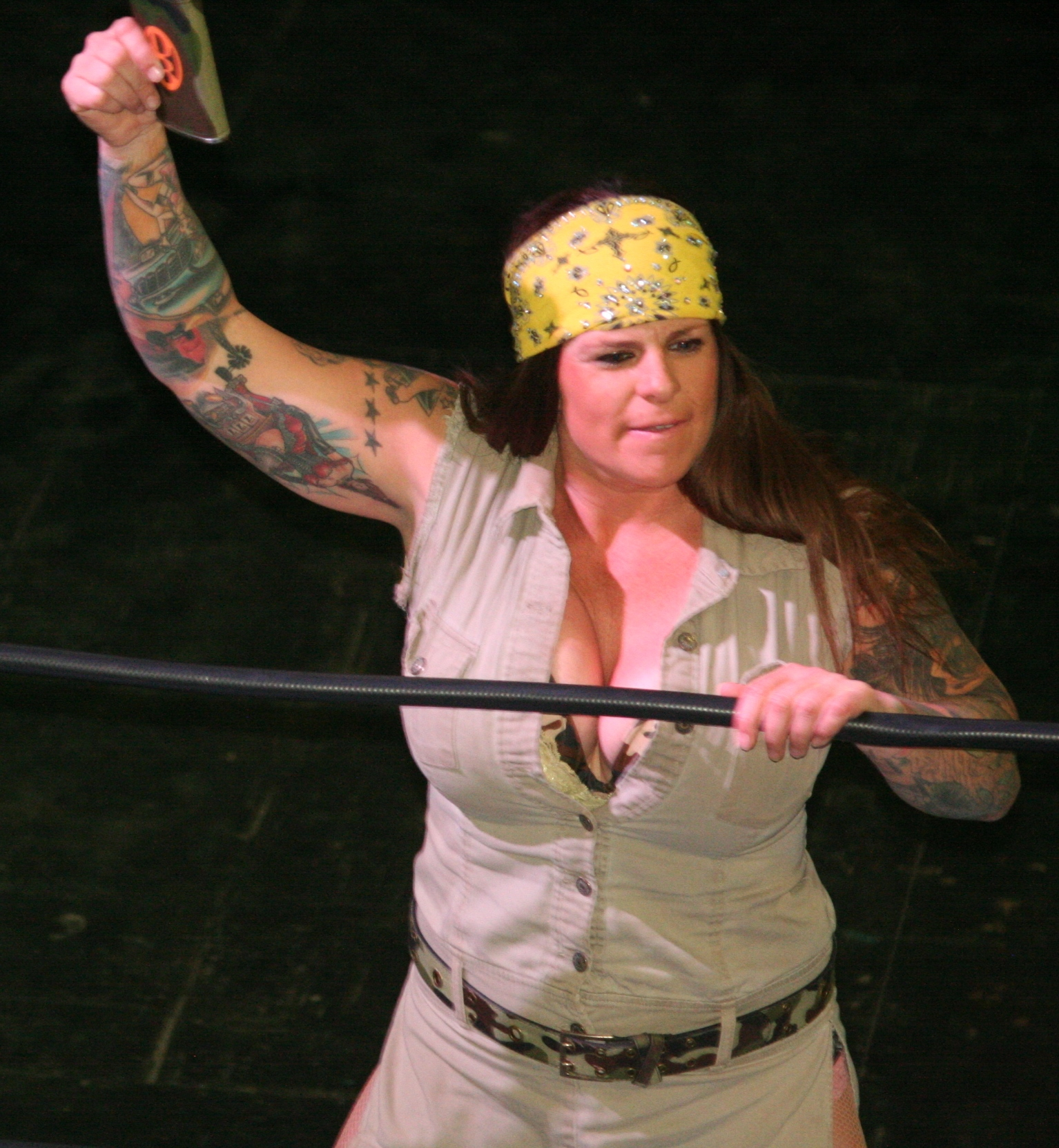
- ODB in November 2015

Personal information
- Born: Jessica Nora Kresa; June 6, 1978 (age 48) Maple Grove, Minnesota, U.S.
- Spouse: Alan Leaf (m. 2023)

Professional wrestling career
- Ring name(s): Jenna Jameson; Jessica Jones; ODB; Poison
- Billed height: 5 ft 7 in (1.70 m)
- Billed weight: 130 lb (59 kg)
- Billed from: Minneapolis, Minnesota
- Trained by: Eddie Sharkey
- Debut: 2001

Jessica Nora Kresa (born June 6, 1978) is an American professional wrestler better known as ODB (One Dirty Bitch). Best known for her time in TNA Wrestling, she is a four-time TNA Women's Knockout Champion, and a one-time TNA Knockouts Tag Team Champion.

== Early life ==
Kresa has an athletic background in ice hockey, which her father encouraged her to pursue. She was the captain of the first girls' team at her high school and played at St. Cloud State University for two years. She began watching professional wrestling as a child, and watching wrestlers such as The Killer Bees. She originally desired to be on the show American Gladiators. She hired a personal trainer in anticipation of her wrestling training.

== Professional wrestling career ==
=== Early career (2001–2004) ===
Kresa tried out for the first season of the World Wrestling Federation (WWF, now WWE)'s reality show, WWF Tough Enough. She made the top 25, but missed the final cut. Back home in Minnesota, she began training and was soon wrestling in independent wrestling promotions in the Midwest, facing male wrestlers such as Ken Anderson and Shawn Daivari. Kresa received her first national exposure in early 2003 as ODB, wrestling Trinity in Total Nonstop Action Wrestling (TNA). She returned to TNA in early 2004 as Poison and was placed in a brief feud with Trinity. She appeared again in TNA during October 2004 and defeated Tracy Brooks.

=== Ohio Valley Wrestling (2006–2007) ===
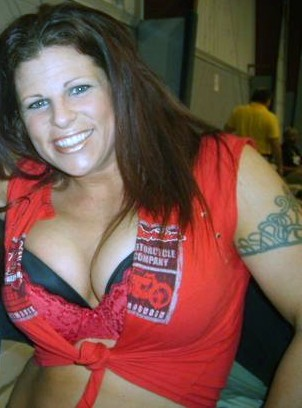
Kresa at an Ohio Valley Wrestling event

On June 5, 2006, Kresa debuted in Ohio Valley Wrestling (OVW) as a villain under the ring name ODB, her gimmick being a woman who was a tough, loud, and crude bargirl, losing to Daisy Mae. Three days later, she lost to Mae in a rematch, beginning a feud between the two in the process. After losing to Mae in a tag team match on June 9, ODB finally defeated her in a tag team match on June 16. She then defeated her in a singles match on June 28 to culminate their feud. On July 12, 2006, ODB began declaring herself as the Women's Champion, even though OVW did not recognize a women's champion at the time. She repeatedly cut promos saying that she was the new Women's Champion, and OVW owner Danny Davis conceded and recognized the Women's Championship as an official title. ODB lost her title to Serena Deeb in a four-way match on September 13, 2006. In the spring of 2007, ODB won the first ever "Miss OVW" crown with help from Victoria Crawford. After Deeb dropped the title to Katie Lea, ODB engaged in an ongoing feud with her which led to a match between the two on June 1, 2007, where ODB regained her title and ended Lea's reign. ODB lost her title for the second time when she dropped it to Milena Roucka in a six-way match on September 19, 2007. During her time in OVW, she gained praise for her matches, but Johnny Ace thought she didn't fit with the WWE Divas division and Triple H encouraged her to sign with Total Nonstop Action Wrestling.

=== Total Nonstop Action Wrestling ===
==== Various feuds (2007–2009) ====
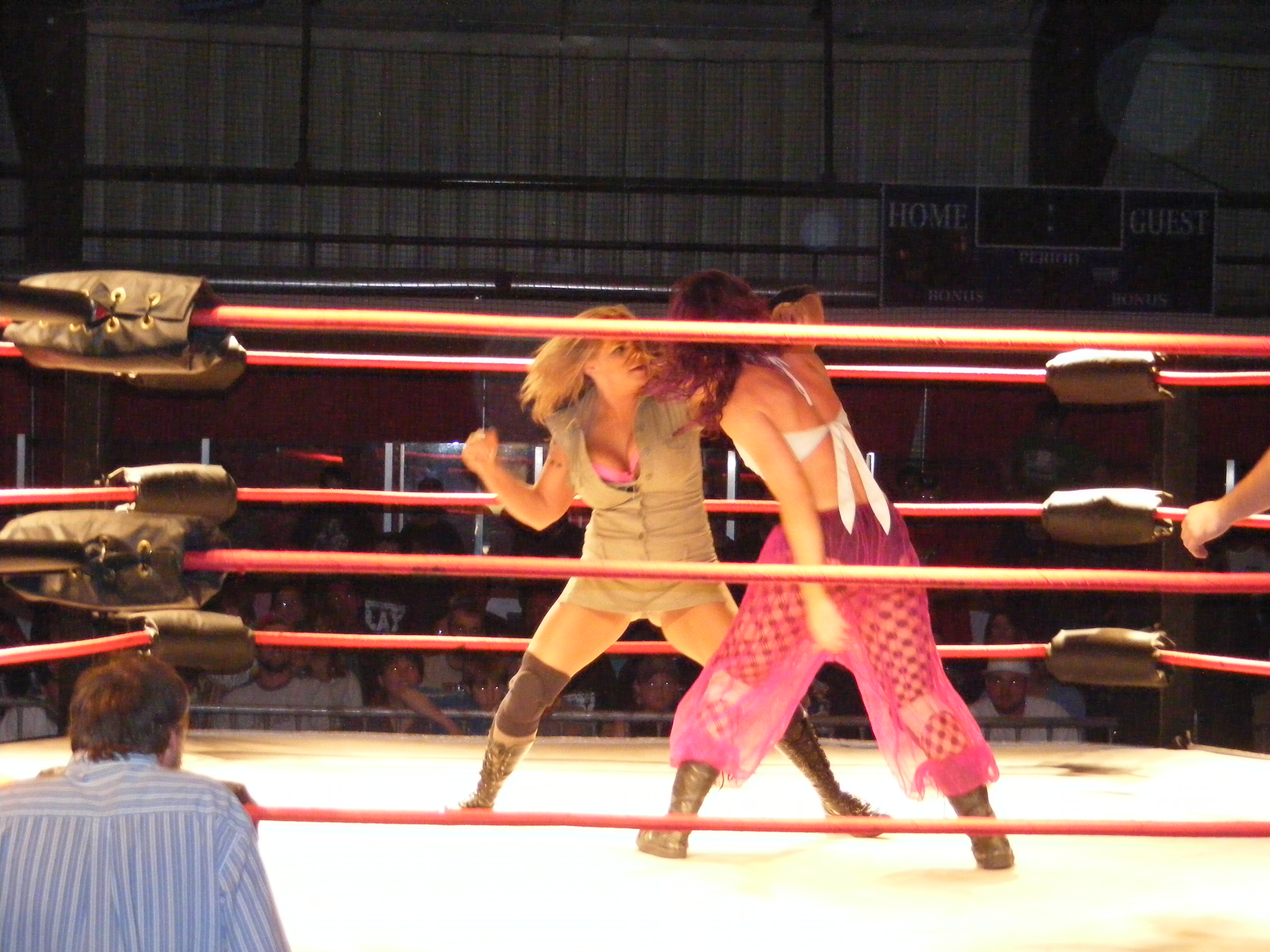
ODB wrestling Roxxi

Kresa was contacted by Total Nonstop Action Wrestling (TNA) to appear at their annual pay-per-view Bound for Glory. She made her in-ring re-debut at the event, participating in a 10-Knockout gauntlet match to crown the first-ever Knockout Champion. She was eliminated by Roxxi Laveaux, and the match was eventually won by Gail Kim. She was originally booked as a villain in the women's division, but her abilities while "drunken" created positive crowd reactions, resulting in a naturally gradual fan favorite push.

On the January 3, 2008 episode of Impact!, ODB won an 8-Knockout gauntlet match to determine the rankings of the Knockout's division in TNA. On the January 17, 2008 episode of Impact!, she defeated Angelina Love, and then challenged Awesome Kong to a title match at Against All Odds. On the January 24 episode of Impact!, Kong attacked Gail Kim after Kim was named 2007 TNA Knockout of the Year, but was saved by ODB. At Against All Odds, ODB was defeated by Kong. At Destination X, she lost a three-way match, which included Kim, to Kong. At Lockdown, ODB and Kim defeated Kong and Raisha Saeed. The following month at Sacrifice, ODB participated in the first-ever Knockouts "Make Over Battle Royal", which was also won by Kim.

In mid–2008, ODB began feuding with The Beautiful People (Angelina Love, Velvet Sky and Cute Kip) alongside Rhaka Khan and Rhino. On the October 30 episode of Impact!, ODB joined A.J. Styles, Samoa Joe, Jay Lethal, Consequences Creed, Petey Williams, Eric Young and The Motor City Machineguns to form a faction of younger wrestlers to oppose The Main Event Mafia.

==== Women's Knockouts Champion (2009–2010) ====
At Genesis, after scoring the pinfall in a six-woman tag team match, it was announced that ODB would get a shot at the Knockout Championship. In this time, ODB feuded with The Kongtourage with most results as wins. At Against All Odds, she unsuccessfully challenged Awesome Kong for the championship. The next week on Impact!, she cut a promo about letting "one lucky guy spend the night" with her, and at Destination X, she chose Cody Deaner as her date. Subsequently, Deaner became her manager. At Lockdown, ODB won the Queen of the Cage match, which was contested in a steel cage. On August 16 at Hard Justice, ODB and Deaner faced Angelina Love and Velvet Sky in a tag team match with Love's Knockouts Championship on the line. Deaner pinned Sky, which led to ODB becoming the new Knockouts Champion, but the duo began arguing over who was the true champion. At No Surrender, ODB defeated Deaner to win the championship. After successfully defending her title against Awesome Kong and Tara, she would face both of them in a 3-way match at Bound for Glory, which ODB won.

ODB turned heel on December 10 after attacking Tara in a backstage segment. On December 20, 2009, at Final Resolution, ODB lost the Knockout's title to Tara. On the December 31 special four-hour, all Knockout edition of Impact! ODB won an eight Knockout Tournament, defeating Traci Brooks and Awesome Kong en route to the finals, where she defeated Hamada, to earn herself a shot at the Knockouts Championship on the January 4 episode of Impact!, where she defeated Tara to regain the Knockouts Championship. Two weeks later at Genesis, ODB lost the title back to Tara in a two out of three falls match.

On June 14, 2010, Kresa announced on her Twitter account that she had parted ways with TNA.

==== Teaming with Jacqueline (2011) ====
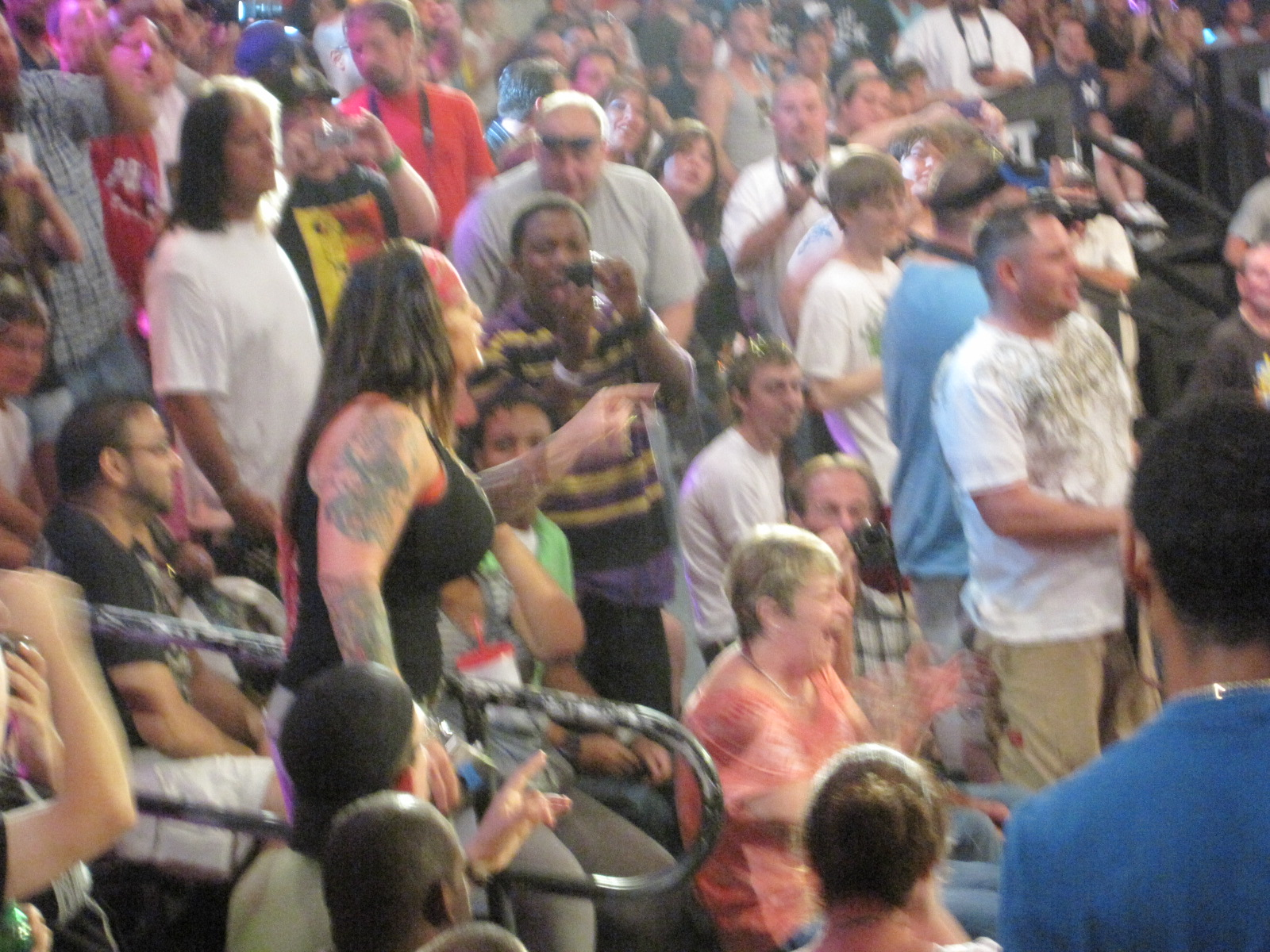
ODB returning to TNA

Despite the announcement of her departure, ODB returned to TNA for one night on the February 24, 2011 episode of Impact!, answering TNA Knockouts Champion Madison Rayne's open challenge and losing to her in the following match.

She made her next appearance in the May 19 episode of the newly christened Impact Wrestling by attacking Velvet Sky, claiming that she had gotten fired because of her. In storyline, ODB was not under contract with TNA and had to make her entrances in matches through the crowd with no entrance music. ODB and Sky faced each other in a singles match on the June 9 episode of Impact Wrestling, with Sky emerging victorious. The following week, ODB cost Sky and Ms. Tessmacher their match for the TNA Knockouts Tag Team Championship, and then beat Sky down with her new partner, Jacqueline. The following week, ODB and Jacqueline defeated Sky and Tessmacher in a tag team match. On the July 7 episode of Impact Wrestling, Sky defeated both ODB and Jacqueline in a two-on-one handicap match, forcing both of them to leave TNA as per stipulation of the match. However, ODB, along with Jacqueline, returned to Impact Wrestling on July 21, once again attacking Sky prior to her match for the Knockouts Championship with Mickie James. They would eventually be attacked by the returning Traci Brooks, before being escorted out of the arena by police officers. On the August 18 episode of Impact Wrestling, ODB and Jacqueline changed their attitudes, abandoning their heelish antics, in order to regain contracts with the promotion. After several weeks of working as fan favorites, ODB and Jacqueline were signed to contracts by the new head of the Knockouts division, Karen Jarrett, on the September 1 episode of Impact Wrestling. ODB returned on the November 17 episode of Impact Wrestling, taking part in a gauntlet match, which was won by Mickie James.

==== Alliance with Eric Young (2011–2014) ====
On the December 22 episode of TNA Impact Wrestling ODB teamed up with Eric Young in the Wild Card Tournament, advancing to the semi-finals after a win over Anarquia and Shannon Moore. The following week, the team was eliminated from the tournament by Magnus and Samoa Joe. After the loss, ODB would pursue an on-screen relationship with Young, and the two would begin a feud with Angelina Love and Winter, and the duo would defeat Love and Winter in a tag team match on the January 26, 2012 episode of Impact Wrestling. On the March 8 episode of Impact Wrestling, ODB and Young defeated Gail Kim and Madison Rayne to win the TNA Knockouts Tag Team Championship. After the match, ODB accepted Young's storyline marriage proposal. ODB and Young made their first title defense two weeks later, when they defeated Mexican America (Rosita and Sarita). ODB's and Young's wedding ceremony took place on the April 12 episode of Impact Wrestling, with Rosita and Sarita interfering. This led to a match, three days later at Lockdown, where ODB and Young defeated Rosita and Sarita in a steel cage match to retain the titles. On July 19, ODB and Young became the longest reigning Knockouts Tag Team Champions in history by surpassing The Beautiful People's reign of 141 days. On the October 18 episode of Impact Wrestling, ODB defeated the newly crowned TNA Knockout Champion Tara in a non-title match. The rivalry between ODB and Tara continued, and the two competed on November 11 at Turning Point, where ODB and Young defeated Tara and her on-screen boyfriend Jesse in a non-title mixed tag team match. On the November 15 episode of Impact Wrestling, ODB competed in a battle royal to determine the next contender for Tara's championship, which was won by the returning Mickie James.

After a four-month absence, ODB returned to TNA in April 2013, as the new referee for the Knockouts division. On the June 20 episode of Impact Wrestling, ODB and Young were stripped of the Knockouts Tag Team Championships by Brooke Hogan — the Knockouts Division Commissioner — due to Young being a male, ending their reign at a record-setting 478 days.

On the July 25 episode of TNA Impact Wrestling, ODB refereed a Knockouts Championship match between champion Mickie James and Gail Kim, which saw Kim slap ODB after turning a blind eye to a dirty pin and James ultimately retaining the title, beginning a rivalry between the two. ODB returned to in-ring action the following week, where she fought Kim to double count-out. On August 15 at the special episode of Impact Wrestling: Hardcore Justice, ODB pinned Kim in a three-way hardcore match, which also included James. The following week, ODB was defeated by Kim in singles competition. ODB and Kim faced off once again in a number one contender's two out of three falls match on the August 29 episode of Impact Wrestling, which ODB won. On September 12, during the tapings of the September 19 episode of Impact Wrestling, ODB defeated Mickie James to win her fourth TNA Women's Knockout Championship. On October 20 at Bound for Glory, ODB lost her title to Kim in a three-way match, also involving Brooke, after an interference from Lei'D Tapa, ending her reign at 38 days. ODB received a rematch on the October 31 episode of Impact Wrestling, but was once again defeated by Kim. On the December 12 episode of Impact Wrestling, ODB was helped to get retribution over Lei'D Tapa by the returning Madison Rayne, thus forming her own alliance. ODB and Rayne teamed together for the first time on the December 19 episode of Impact Wrestling, where they defeated Tapa and Kim, after Rayne pinned Kim. ODB defeated Brittany on the April 29, 2014 episode of TNA Xplosion, in what would turn out to be her final match with TNA.

On August 21, 2014, ODB was removed from the Knockouts website and her TNA profile was moved to the alumni section of the roster, therefore announcing her departure from the company. On September 5, 2014, ODB competed in TNA One Night Only: World Cup 2014, which aired on tape delay from April. She competed for Team Eric Young and lost to Angelina Love. In the main event, ODB managed to eliminate Gail Kim before being eliminated by Robbie E.

=== Ring of Honor (2015–2016) ===
On January 3, 2015, ODB debuted for Ring of Honor, saving The Briscoe Brothers from an attack of The Kingdom (Michael Bennett, Matt Taven and Maria Kanellis). At the January 24 tapings, The Kingdom defeated ODB and the Briscoes after Bennett and Taven attacked ODB, allowing Kanellis to pin her. On March 1 at the ROH 13th Anniversary Show pay-per-view, ODB gained a measure of revenge by defeating Kanellis in a singles match.

=== Return to TNA Wrestling (2016–2017; 2019–2020, 2021, 2026) ===
On the December 15, 2016 episode of Impact Wrestling dubbed "Total Nonstop Deletion", ODB made a one-night appearance to TNA to answer Sienna's #1 contender challenge for the TNA Knockouts Championship in a losing effort. After the match was over "Broken" Matt Hardy's drone, Vanguard 1, received a motorboat from ODB.

Two months later the following year on March 2 during the tapings of Impact Wrestling, ODB returned to TNA, defeating Laurel Van Ness. On April 6, 2017, during the episode of Impact Wrestling, ODB won a gauntlet match to become number one contender for Rosemary's Knockouts Championship, a match she eventually went on to lose.

On November 2, 2019, TNA Wrestling announced that proceeds from their Melrose Ballroom TV tapings would go towards replacing her food truck that burned down in Chicago during the weekend of Starrcast and AEW All Out. She confirmed that she would be present but didn't comment on whether or not she'd be wrestling at the event.

ODB made her third return to TNA Wrestling on the February 2, 2021 episode of Impact!, where she helped Jazz and Jordynne Grace as they were attacked by Kimber Lee, Susan and the Knockouts Champion Deonna Purrazzo.

At Rebellion, ODB, Mickie James and Taryn Terrell lost to The Elegance Brand (Ash by Elegance, Heather by Elegance, and M by Elegance) and the announcement of ODB's TNA Hall of Fame induction at Bound for Glory.

=== All Elite Wrestling (2019) ===
ODB made a surprise appearance at All Out, participating in the Casino Battle Royal. She eliminated Teal Piper before being eliminated by Britt Baker.

=== National Wrestling Alliance (2019) ===
On December 14, 2019, at Into the Fire, ODB made her National Wrestling Alliance (NWA) debut as Allysin Kay's mystery tag team partner, defeating Marti Belle and Melina.

== Personal life ==
Aside from being a wrestler, Kresa worked as a bartender at the Courtside Bar & Grill in Anoka, Minnesota. and runs a food truck called ODB's Meat & Greet.

== Other media ==
In 2011, Kresa starred alongside fellow wrestlers Kurt Angle, James Storm, Matt Morgan, Terry Gerin and Sid Eudy in the horror movie Death from Above.

Kresa appeared on the June 23, 2013, episode of the Animal Planet show Off the Hook: Extreme Catches which is hosted by Eric Young.

In 2014, Kresa appeared on an episode of My Family Recipe Rocks, hosted by Joey Fatone, on an episode called "Campfire Cooking with Professional Wrestler Jessie Kresa". She shared her recipes for ODB Bloody Marys, One Dirty Bean Dip, Walking Tacos and Campfire Cones.

=== Filmography ===
Year	Title	Role	Notes
2011	Death from Above	Marge	Film debut
2011	How to Score Your Life	Herself	

== Championships and accomplishments ==
- Midwest Pro Wrestling
  - MPW Cruiserweight Championship (1 time)
- Ohio Valley Wrestling
  - OVW Women's Championship (2 times, inaugural)
  - Miss OVW (2007)
- Pro Wrestling Illustrated
  - Ranked No. 14 of the top 50 female wrestlers in the PWI Female 50 in 2008
- Steel Domain Wrestling
  - SDW Women's Championship (1 time)
- Texas Wrestling Federation
  - TWF Women's Championship (1 time)
- Total Nonstop Action Wrestling
  - TNA Knockouts Championship (4 times)
  - TNA Knockouts Tag Team Championship (1 time) – with Eric Young
  - Gauntlet for the Gold (2008, 2017 – Knockouts)
  - New Year's Knockout Eve Tournament (2010)
  - Queen of the Cage (2009)
  - TNA World Cup of Wrestling (2014) – with Bully Ray, Gunner, Eddie Edwards and Eric Young
  - TNA Hall of Fame (Class of 2026)
- United States Wrestling Organization
  - USWO Television Championship (1 time)

== Mixed martial arts ==
0-1-0 (wins-losses-draws)
Result	Opponent	Method	Event title	Date	Round	Time
Loss	Kelly Kobold	Submission (Armbar)	ROF 9 – Eruption	08/9/2003	1	N/A
