= Steven Sabados =

Canadian television host

- Born: May 16, 1965 (age 61); Niagara Falls, Ontario, Canada
- Occupation: Television personality
- Years active: 1992–present
- Spouse: Chris Hyndman (m. 2008; died 2015)

Steven Sabados (born May 16, 1965) is a Canadian television host, designer and writer, who frequently appeared in television programs with his husband and business partner Chris Hyndman and as one of the hosts of The Goods, a daytime talk show on CBC Television.

== Career ==
Born and raised in Niagara Falls, Ontario, Sabados attended Fanshawe College in London, Ontario where he graduated in 1986 with a diploma in fine art. Moving to Toronto, Sabados became display director for Eatons and Roots Canada, and opened the Sabados Group, Inc., a design firm.

Along with Hyndman, Sabados starred in the first three seasons of Designer Guys, a Canadian design show on HGTV Canada. In 2004, they debuted a new show with a similar format, entitled Design Rivals, and a makeover show called So Chic with Steven and Chris. From 2008 to 2015, he co-hosted the afternoon talk show Steven and Chris with Hyndman. It aired first on CBC Television in Canada and subsequently on the Live Well Network in the United States. Sabados chose not to continue the show on his own or with a new cohost following Hyndman's death in 2015, resulting in its cancellation.

Sabados frequently appears as a guest expert on various television shows and as a guest columnist in various design magazines. In an interview given on May 23, 2016, Sabados announced that he would be returning as one of several co-hosts, alongside Jessi Cruickshank and other hosts still to be named, of a new lifestyle program on CBC Television in October 2016. The series was later announced under the title The Goods, with the other two hosts named as Andrea Bain and Shahir Massoud.

== Personal life ==
Sabados is openly gay. Despite his and Hyndman's being an off-screen couple since 1988, they did not publicly acknowledge their relationship until 2007. They married in 2008 and remained a couple until Hyndman's death on August 3, 2015.
