= Hammond's Candies =

American candy manufacturer

- Industry: Confectionery
- Founded: 1920; 105 years ago
- Founder: Carl T. Hammond, Sr.
- Headquarters: Denver, Colorado
- Key people: Andrew Schuman, CEO
- Website: hammondscandies.com

Hammond's Candies is a candy manufacturer of hard candies and chocolates in the United States. The company makes lollipops, ribbon candy, and its best known product, oversized candy canes. Hammond's offerings have also included Honey Ko Kos (chocolates topped with shredded coconut), Mitchell Sweet (a "bite-sized" marshmallow surrounded by caramel), and candy coal.

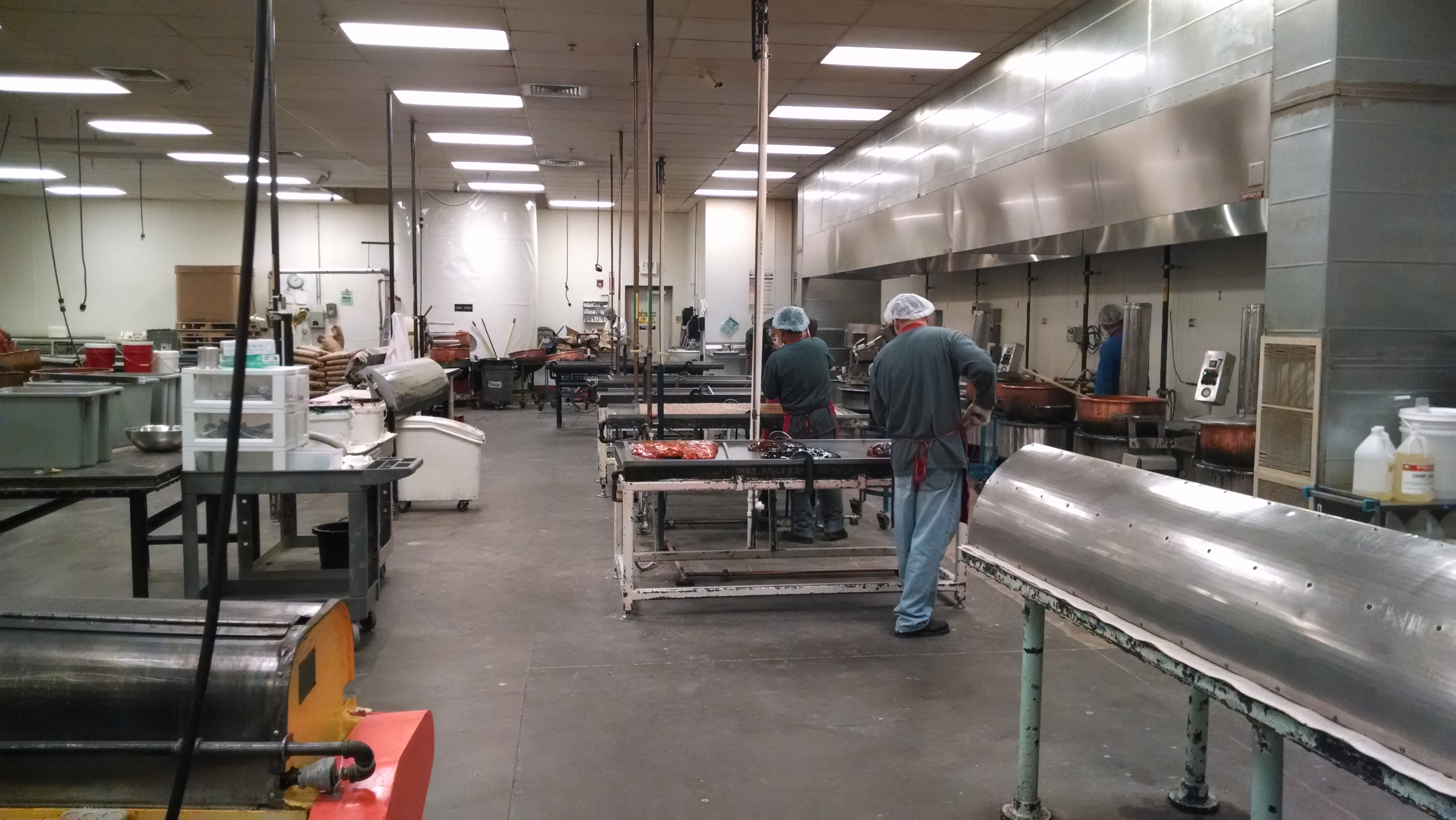
Interior of Hammond's Candies factory

Hammond's has expanded its offerings to include dips, pretzels, caramel corns and chocolate bars. After acquiring McCraw's Candies and Old Dominion Peanut Company, they further expanded their offerings to include peanut brittle and flat taffy.

== History ==
Carl T. Hammond Sr. founded Hammond's Candy Company in Denver, Colorado in 1920, after working for several years as an apprentice in the candymaking industry. During his early days in business, he developed his own original candy, Carl's Honey KoKos, which consisted of chocolates topped with shredded coconut. In the 1930s, the company began producing and selling caramel-covered marshmallows called "Mitchell Sweets," which were named after Hammond, Sr.'s friend from whom he purchased the candy's recipe. The company continues to sell Mitchell Sweets as of 2020.

The company remained in the Hammond family for many decades, being run by Hammond Sr. until his death in 1966, then by his son, Carl T. ("Tom") Hammond Jr., until his death in 1985, and finally by Hammond, Jr.'s son-in-law, Emery Dorsey IV, until 1999. In 1999, the family sold the company to Ralph Nafziger of Rocky Mountain Chocolate Factory, but Dorsey continued to work at the company in product development.

Andrew Schuman took over as CEO in 2007. Hammond's purchased McCraw's Candies, a maker of flat taffy, in 2010. In 2013 Hammond's purchased Old Dominion Peanut Company.

=== Old Dominion Peanut Company ===
Old Dominion was established in 1913 in Norfolk, Virginia by the Worsham Family. The company manufactures and markets peanut, cashew and pecan candies as well as its main product, peanut brittle.

In October 2007, one of Old Dominion's candy and peanut brittle manufacturing buildings in Norfolk caught fire. The building was built in the early 1900s for High Rock beverage company, and it was later used as a wheel bearing factory before being sold to Old Dominion.

Old Dominion was sold to Hammond's Candies in 2013. In 2018, amid rising rent in the surrounding neighborhood, the Old Dominion factory in Norfolk was permanently closed, with some operations relocating to Hammond's Denver plant and other operations being outsourced to a third party.

=== McCraw's Taffy ===
Marcus D. McCraw opened a candy making business in Farmersville, Texas in 1908. His wife made the first "peanut pattie" and they produced Lance products. The business was at North Main Street across from Cello-Wrap Printing Company. Dee and Sarah McCraw created the famed taffy product.

== Operations ==
Hammond's specializes in handmade confectionery products, using much of the same equipment and recipes as used in the early days of the company and avoiding significant automation of the process. The machines at the company's Denver plant date from the late 1800s and early 1900s. The company handmakes about 10 million candy canes and 2 million lollipops per year.

Hammond's has been offering factory tours at their Denver plant since 1999.

== Products ==
Hammond's product lines tend to focus on handmade, gourmet, or nostalgic candies such as the classic Mitchell Sweet. The company's most popular products include candy canes, lollipops, and ribbon candy. Other products include:

- Hard candies
- Chocolate bars
- Hot cocoa
- Cookies
- Taffy
- Marshmallows
- Caramel products
- Licorice
- Popcorn
- Peanut brittle
- Truffles

The company also maintains an "Oops! Room" through which they sell imperfect candies produced as a byproduct of the manufacturing process, overages, and other mistakes. In addition to edible products, the company also sells apparel, toys, and other souvenirs.
