= The Social (talk show) =

- Genre: Talk show Video podcast
- Presented by: Cynthia Loyst; Jessica Allen; Andrea Bain
- Theme music composer: Nick Fowler
- Country of origin: Canada
- No. of seasons: 13
- No. of episodes: 1,000+

Production
- Production locations: Bell Media Queen Street; Toronto, Ontario

Original release
- Network: CTV
- Release: September 2, 2013 – present

The Social is a Canadian daytime television talk show, which airs weekday afternoons on CTV and CTV 2. Using a panel format similar to American talk shows such as The View or The Talk, the show is hosted by Andrea Bain and Cynthia Loyst. On Friday editions, Jessica Allen serves as an additional co-host.

The series covers news, lifestyle and entertainment topics, and places a strong emphasis on direct and live interaction with viewers through social media. In August 2026, Bell Media announced the program would be "reimagined" as a video podcast beginning with the fourteenth season, but would continue to air on CTV and Crave.

== History ==
The show premiered on September 2, 2013, originally hosted by Melissa Grelo, Elaine Lui, Loyst and Traci Melchor with Allen as a digital correspondent for the show.

Grelo took a maternity leave from the program in spring 2014. A series of celebrity guest hosts appeared during her absence, including Jann Arden, Marilyn Denis, Wendy Crewson, Elisha Cuthbert, Arlene Dickinson, Arielle Kebbel, Emily Procter, Sarah Rafferty and Debbie Travis.

Logo used from 2013 to 2019

Melchor took a leave of absence from the show in 2016, with Marci Ien stepping in as a substitute host following the cancellation of Canada AM. Melchor later revealed that she took the leave of absence for mental health reasons, after bursting into uncontrollable tears while preparing for an interview with Lynn Keane, an author who had published a book about her son's suicide, leading Melchor to realize that she had not fully processed her grief over the 2015 death of her friend Chris Hyndman.

Melchor announced in March 2017 that she would not be returning to the program full-time, instead concentrating on her duties with eTalk, although she will occasionally still appear on the show as a substitute host when one of the regulars is away. Ien became a permanent cohost of the program in 2017. She left the program upon her election to the House of Commons of Canada for the federal electoral district of Toronto Centre in 2020.

Lui announced her departure from the program in summer 2023 after ten years, with Andrea Bain announced as her successor.

In August 2026, it was announced that Grelo would be departing the program. With Grelo's departure, Loyst is the only original co-host remaining since the show's beginning in 2013. It was also announced that the show ould switch formats, becoming a video podcast from its fourteenth season, losing its live studio audience. The new format was met with criticism following the season premiere. In an op-ed for the Toronto Star, Leanne Delap wrote "[w]ithout all those people in the room, reacting in real time with murmurs of assent or disagreement or spontaneous applause, we lose a feeling of representation in the conversation, as well as a depth of sound for the viewer at home."

== Controversy ==
=== Jess Allen comments on hockey players ===
On November 12, 2019, during a discussion regarding the firing of ice hockey commentator Don Cherry from Hockey Night in Canada, Allen said that she doesn't "worship at the altar of hockey" and found that those who did, in her experience, "all tended to be white boys who weren't, let's say, very nice." Allen also added, "they were not generally thoughtful, they were often bullies." Allen later clarified on Twitter saying, "I never said every white boy, just the ones whose unsavoury behaviour, which didn’t feel very Canadian, I witnessed. Because of this, I am guilty of having conflicted feelings about hockey being so closely linked to our national identity." On November 13, Allen acknowledged that she "struck a nerve with many people." The controversy resulted in social media backlash, including the hashtag #FireJessAllen, and the Canadian Broadcast Standards Council issuing a notice on their website that they had received "a large number of similar complaints" and that "no further complaints will be accepted by the CBSC on this issue." On November 14, CTV issued a statement apologizing to "everyone who was offended by the remarks,". However, they wouldn't restrict their hosts from "offering their opinions on an opinion show," but they will "always listen to viewers when they offer theirs." Allen also issued an apology saying she was only speaking about hockey players she knew personally, and that Don Cherry reminded her of them; however, she couldn't "apologize to the very specific hockey players" she was originally referring to.

== International broadcasts ==
The series began airing in syndication in the United States through PPI Releasing and Sony Pictures Television via selective markets since September 2015, although a few stations had started airing the show during a test run prior to the push to expand it in more American television markets. It had been targeted for a soft 2014 US launch but was held back in order to give the show enough time to find its footing.
