= Mootz =

Mootz may refer to:

- Mootz Candies, in Pottsville, Pennsylvania
- Mathis Mootz (born 1976), German electronic musician and DJ
- Mónica Spear Mootz (1984–2014), Venezuelan model
