= Rewrapped =

- Genre: Reality, Cooking
- Starring: Joey Fatone
- Judges: Marc Summers (Head Judge)
- Country of origin: United States
- Original language: English
- No. of seasons: 2
- No. of episodes: 26

Production
- Running time: 30 Minutes (22 minutes with commercials)
- Production company: BSTV Entertainment

Original release
- Network: Food Network
- Release: April 21 – December 1, 2014

Rewrapped is a reality cooking television show hosted by Joey Fatone that premiered on April 21, 2014, on Food Network. Similar to short-form cooking reality shows, it features three chefs challenged to first recreate a classic snack food, then innovate a totally new dish using said snack food as the main ingredient. The show is a loose spinoff of the show Unwrapped, whose host Marc Summers acts as "Head Judge" for each episode, alongside a representative of the company that produces the food of the day, and a third impartial judge involved in the food industry in some way (chef, critic, blogger, etc.).

On the premiere week, two new episodes of the 30-minute series aired Monday nights at 8:00 pm and 8:30 pm ET. Up to May 5, 2014, one new episode aired in the 8:00 slot, with a repeat episode at 8:30 pm. As of May 12, 2014, a single new episode airs in the Monday 8:00 pm slot, followed by an episode of Unwrapped at 8:30 pm.

Rewrapped returned for its second season on September 8, 2014, still airing in its 8:00 pm EST Monday slot, and once again followed by an encore episode of Rewrapped at 8:30 pm EST.

== Format ==
Each episode of Rewrapped features three chefs undergoing two cooking challenges. After dishes are prepared, the three judges evaluate each dish, scoring them on a scale of 1 to 10. This makes for a possible score range of 3 (lowest) to 30 (highest).

Like its parent show Unwrapped, each episode features short segments on the creation & packaging of the food of the day.

=== Round 1: Recreate ===
The three chefs are given 30 minutes to try to replicate the exact snack food from scratch. In the case of food items with a specific shape, the chefs must bring their own "molds" to use to try to duplicate the appearance of the food. The chef's attempts are judged on taste, appearance, and how closely they replicated the original food. In season 1, no eliminations took place in this round, but starting in season 2, the chef with the lowest score is eliminated from the competition.

=== Round 2: Innovate ===
The chefs (all 3 in season 1; the remaining 2 in season 2) are given another 30 minutes to use the food of the day as the main ingredient in their own original dish. The chefs are supplied with enough of the original food to use in their dishes. In this round, taste, appearance and originality are the key factors in the judge's scores.

In season 1, the scores from both rounds are totalled, and the chef with the highest combined score won. For season 2, both remaining chefs are scored only for the Innovate round to determine the winner. In both cases, the winner of the episode receives a year's supply of the snack food.

== Episodes ==
=== Season 1 ===
Episode #	Episode Title	Original Air Date	Snack Food	Episode/Production #
1	All That Glitters Is Goldfish	April 21, 2014	Pepperidge Farm Cheddar Goldfish	RW0101H
2	Pie for One, Pie for All	April 21, 2014	Tastykake Glazed Cherry Pie	RW0102H
3	SpaghettiOMG	April 28, 2014	Franco-American SpaghettiOs with Meatballs	RW0103H
4	Who You Callin' a CupCake?	May 5, 2014	Hostess CupCake	RW0104H
5	A Chip Off the Old Block	May 12, 2014	Herr's Potato Chips (Cheddar & Sour Cream, Salt & Vinegar and BBQ flavors)	RW0105H
6	Let's Get Ready to Crumble!	May 19, 2014	Entenmann's Original Recipe Chocolate Chip Cookie	RW0106H
7	That Makes Two of Utz	May 26, 2014	Utz Pretzel Rod	RW0107H
8	Milano, Milano! I Love You!	June 2, 2014	Pepperidge Farm Mint Milano Cookie	RW0108H
9	Now Krimpet! Krimpet Good!	June 9, 2014	Tastykake Butterscotch Krimpet	RW0109H
10	A Word to the Wise Cheez Waffies	July 7, 2014	Wise Cheez Waffies	RW0110H
11	Twinkie, Twinkie, Little Star	June 16, 2014	Hostess Twinkie	RW0111H
12	The Awesome Blossom	June 23, 2014	Outback Steakhouse Bloomin' Onion	RW0112H
13	Rich Frosted Fun	June 30, 2014	Entenmann's Rich Frosted Donut	RW0113H

=== Season 2 ===
Episode #	Episode Title	Original Air Date	Snack Food	Episode/Production #
1	Ho Ho You Didn't!	September 8, 2014	Hostess Ho Hos	RW0201H
2	Lay's It All on the Line	September 15, 2014	Lay's "Do Us A Flavor" Potato Chips (Cheddar Bacon Mac & Cheese, Kettle-Cooked Wasabi Ginger, Wavy Mango Salsa, and Cappuccino flavors)	RW0202H
3	Let Them Eat Koffee Kake!	September 22, 2014	Tastykake Koffee Kakes	RW0203H
4	Pirouettes on Point	September 29, 2014	Pepperidge Farm Pirouette wafer cookies	RW0204H
5	Boy, Ar-Dees Good!	October 6, 2014	Chef Boyardee Beef Ravioli	RW0205H
6	Sno Ball Free-for-All	October 13, 2014	Hostess Sno Balls	RW0206H
7	Thin Mint Condition	October 20, 2014	Girl Scout Cookie Thin Mints	RW0207H
8	Lend Me Your Ear of Candy Corn	October 27, 2014	Jelly Belly Candy Corn	RW0208H
9	Ritzy Business	November 3, 2014	Ritz Crackers Ritz Bits with Cheese	RW0209H
10	Pudding Up a Fight	November 10, 2014	Swiss Miss Triple Chocolate Dream Pudding	RW0210H
11	Jumpin' for Pumpkin Donuts	November 17, 2014	Dunkin' Donuts Glazed Pumpkin Cake Donut	RW0211H
12	Oatmeal Raisin the Roof	November 24, 2014	Pepperidge Farms Oatmeal Raisin Cookies	RW0212H
13	Hooked on a Candy Cane Feeling	December 1, 2014	Hammond's Candies Candy Canes	RW0213H
