= Chris Hyndman =

Canadian interior decorator and television personality

- Born: Christopher Edward Hyndman; March 3, 1966; Ottawa, Ontario, Canada
- Died: August 3, 2015 (aged 49); Toronto, Ontario, Canada
- Occupations: Television personality, designer
- Years active: 1992–2015
- Spouse: Steven Sabados (m. 2008–2015)

Christopher Edward Hyndman (March 3, 1966 – August 3, 2015) was a Canadian interior decorator and television personality, who was co-host of the afternoon talk show Steven and Chris on CBC Television until his death in August 2015.

== Career ==
Hyndman worked in the makeup department of the Hudson's Bay Company before becoming a makeup artist for Citytv at the invitation of television personality Jeanne Beker.

Hyndman and his husband Steven Sabados launched the interior design firm Sabados Group in 1992.

Aside from private clientele, they also did set design work for various television productions in the Toronto area, and later starred in the first three seasons of Designer Guys, a Canadian design show. In 2004, Sabados and Hyndman debuted a new show with a similar format, titled Design Rivals, and a makeover show called So Chic with Steven and Chris in 2005.

According to Beker, Hyndman did not originally have aspirations of becoming a television personality himself, but was active in supporting Sabados' goals while being personally content to work behind the scenes. He became an on-air personality, initially reluctantly, only when a television producer suggested that they work together as a duo because of their unique and telegenic chemistry.

== Personal life ==
Hyndman was born in Ottawa and grew up in the Avalon Peninsula of Newfoundland and Labrador. He first met Sabados through mutual friends at a Toronto bar in 1988. They moved in together three months later. Despite being a longtime couple off-screen, they did not publicly acknowledge their relationship until 2007. They married a year later.

== Death ==
On August 3, 2015, Hyndman was found unresponsive in a laneway directly below the condominium unit he shared with Sabados in Toronto, shortly after 11 p.m. EDT. He was pronounced dead shortly after. He was 49 years old. Hyndman and Sabados had just returned from a vacation in Barbados one day earlier.

While no confirmed cause of death has been released, the Toronto Police Service indicated that it was not considered a criminal matter, leading many to suspect it may have been a suicide. Two days after his death, his mother told the media that Hyndman was a sleepwalker, and she believes he fell off the couple's balcony during a sleep walk. In May 2016, Sabados said he does not share this view.

Following Hyndman's death, production and airing of Steven and Chris was suspended pending a decision from Sabados on whether he wanted to continue the show on his own or with a new co-host. On August 21, 2015, Sabados announced that he would not continue the show, resulting in its cancellation. In May 2016, Sabados gave his first in-depth media interview since Hyndman's death, telling Heather Hiscox of CBC News that Hyndman was the "idea guy" in their personal and professional partnership. Around the same time, Sabados announced that he was creating a new daytime talk show, The Goods, to premiere on CBC in fall 2016 with co-hosts Jessi Cruickshank, Andrea Bain and Shahir Massoud. According to Sabados, while he couldn't imagine returning to television on his own or with a single replacement co-host for Hyndman, the new show's four-host panel format felt more comforting and freeing for him.
