= Andrea Bain =

Canadian television host and journalist

Andrea Bain is a Canadian television personality, who was announced in August 2023 as a new co-host of the daytime panel talk show The Social.

She has previously been a host of programming for Slice and HGTV, including Three Takes, Revamped and Live Here, Buy This. From 2016 to 2018 she was cohost with Steven Sabados, Jessi Cruickshank and Shahir Massoud of the daytime talk show The Goods, for which they received an ensemble nomination for Best Host in a Program or Series at the 6th Canadian Screen Awards in 2018.

She has also been an entertainment and lifestyle journalist for both Global News and CTV News, and published the non-fiction book Single Girl Problems: Why Being Single Isn't a Problem to Be Solved in 2018.

In June 2026, Bain was announced as the host of a revived version of Big Brother Canada.
