= Design Rivals =

Canadian design show

- Genre: Reality/design
- Presented by: Steven Sabados; Chris Hyndman
- Country of origin: Canada
- Original language: English
- No. of seasons: 3

Original release
- Network: HGTV (Canada)
- Release: June 27, 2004 – January 16, 2007

Design Rivals was a Canadian design show, which premiered on HGTV in 2004. The series featured designers Chris Hyndman and Steven Sabados redesigning living spaces for clients.

Following from the duo's earlier series Designer Guys, in which they allowed their debates and disagreements over design choices to be depicted as part of the series, the format of Design Rivals saw the duo meeting the homeowner in a neutral space away from the home, so that their initial design plans would be based solely on their impressions of the client's personality rather than familiarity with the space. They would each then come up with their own design ideas before finally seeing the home, thus setting up potential debates and conflicts as they decided how to proceed with the design. Sabados described this format as having been inspired by the fact that families often disagree about design decisions in their home, so he and Hyndman wanted to depict their process of resolving their differences of opinion to arrive at a design plan they were both happy with.

The series aired for three seasons, ending in 2007. The duo subsequently moved to CBC Television to create the daytime talk show Steven and Chris.
