= Cynthia Loyst =

Canadian talk show host and media personality

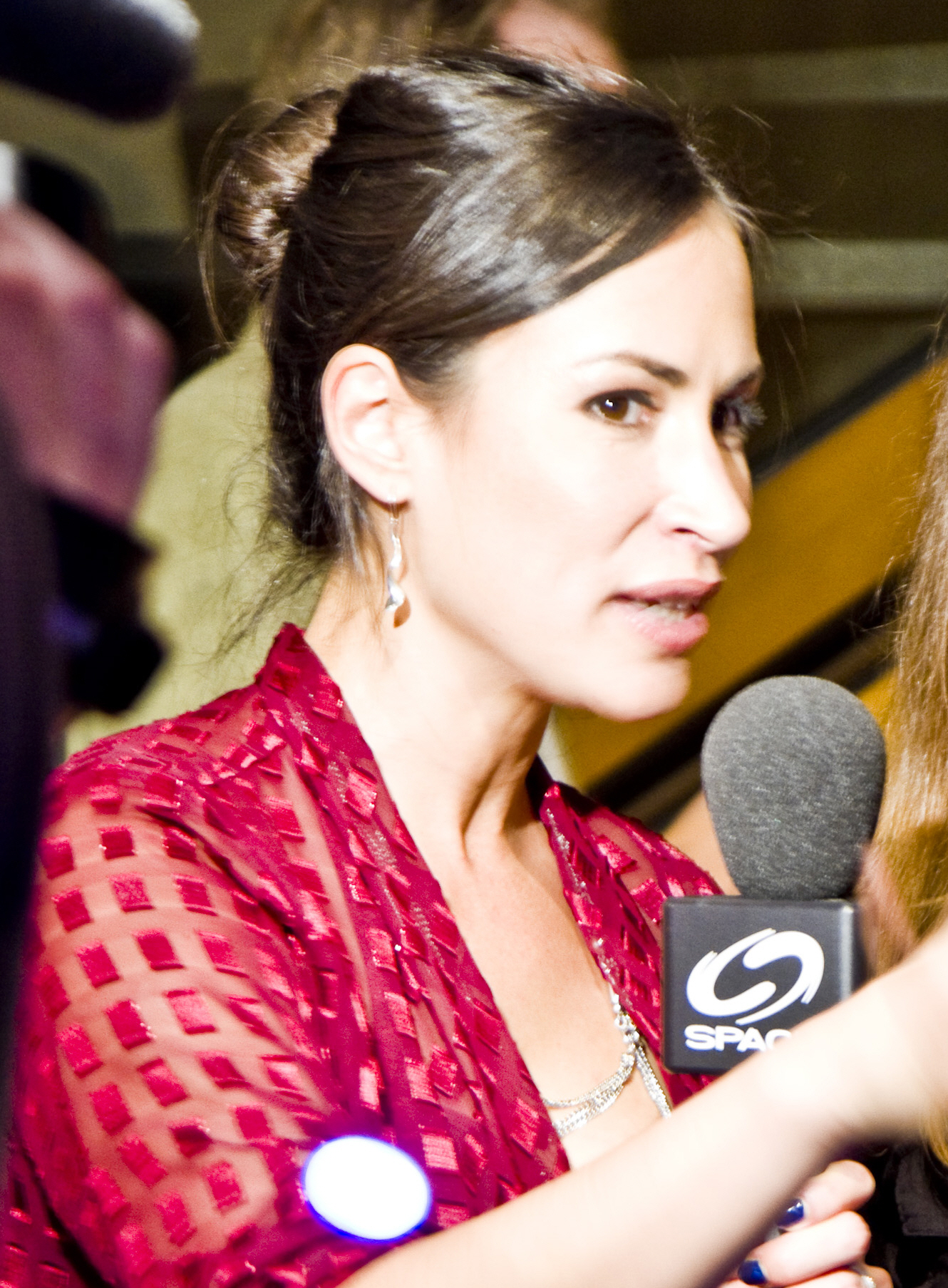
- Born: Barrie, Ontario, Canada
- Education: York University (BFA)
- Occupation: television host
- Known for: The Social

Cynthia Loyst is a Canadian talk show host and media personality. She currently co-hosts CTV's The Social, along with two other women. Loyst is also the creator of Find Your Pleasure, an online hub to help readers find pleasure in their lives.

== Career ==
Loyst's love for entertainment started at an early age. She discovered her love for cosplay when she would often dress up as male characters from Star Wars or Battle of the Planets at the age of six.

Loyst studied at York University's film program, and graduated with a Bachelor of Fine Arts Degree. As well, she studied at York's Women/Gender Studies Department. During this time, she wrote a sex column for the independent magazine Rosco titled Pandora's Box.

Loyst has appeared on both television and radio throughout the years. Television appearances include The Marilyn Denis Show, CTV NewsNet, TVOntario and ETalk, while radio appearances include 104.5 CHUM FM, 103.9 Proud FM, and Virgin Radio 99.9 FM. She talked about a variety of subjects revolving around relationships, such as "dating, mating, and relating".

She has also given guest lectures on technology, sexuality, and media at many schools in the Greater Toronto Area, such as the University of Toronto, Sheridan College, Ryerson University and Centennial College.

=== Sex Matters ===
Loyst was the host of the Canadian talk show Sex Matters which was broadcasts on CP24 exploring many issues about human sexuality. Live broadcasts of the program aired Thursday and Friday nights at 10:30 pm on CP24. CP24 also rebroadcast the program every Saturday and Sunday nights at 10:30 pm. Star! also aired the program every Saturday and Sunday nights at 11:30 pm. The program first aired on February 11, 2010 on CP24.
