= The After Show =

MTV Canada television show

The After Show is the title of several aftershows aired by MTV's Canadian channel, originally connected to reality series by MTV such as Laguna Beach and The Hills. Because the Canadian channel now known as MTV was originally approved as a talk channel, it is required to emphasize interactive talk programming. Companion talk shows are not required for all MTV reality shows, but in the case of "reality dramas" like The Hills, the After Shows help to contextualize the series in order to fit the channel's mandate.

Essentially an extension of the channel's flagship program MTV Live, the typical After Show featured two of the former MTV Live hosts, most recently Jessi Cruickshank and Dan Levy, discussing the program immediately preceding with input from studio audience members, callers, emailers, and webcam participants. Many stars of The Hills, such as Lauren Conrad, Heidi Montag, and Holly Montag appeared in person, while several others have participated in live phone or video interviews.

The most recent format of the show included a discussion of entertainment news, fashion, and pop culture. While episodes following shows like The Hills primarily presented a discussion of that particular program, episodes airing after no program in particular often discussed more varied aspects of popular culture.

The After Show's finale aired following the final episode of The Hills on July 13, 2010. This episode was a special show broadcast live from Los Angeles, and many stars from the show including Lauren Conrad, Whitney Port, Kristin Cavallari, and Brody Jenner appeared. The last in-studio episode aired a week before. Shortly after, Dan Levy stated via Twitter that The After Show team decided to end the show on a high note, effectively confirming the show's end, at least in the form in which it had been known to that point.
