= Common Knowledge (game show) =

American game show (2019–2021)

- Genre: Game show
- Created by: Ryan Tredinnick
- Directed by: Rob George
- Presented by: Joey Fatone
- Country of origin: United States
- Original language: English
- No. of seasons: 3
- No. of episodes: 260

Production
- Executive producers: Tim Puntillo; Adam Zuvich; Rich Sirop
- Running time: 20–22 minutes
- Production company: Game Show Enterprises

Original release
- Network: Game Show Network
- Release: January 14, 2019 – August 13, 2021

Common Knowledge is an American television game show hosted by Joey Fatone that aired on Game Show Network from January 14, 2019 to August 13, 2021.

On April 17, 2019, media reports stated that GSN had renewed the show for a 130-episode second season. On March 25, 2021, GSN renewed the show for a third season, which premiered on May 17, 2021.

== Gameplay ==
Common Knowledge "tests contestants on everyday questions that, in theory, they should know the answers to." Two teams of three players consisting of family, friends, or co-workers will compete answering multiple-choice questions in three rounds of play with the winning team going on to the bonus round to play for $10,000. Some Season 2 episodes are "Second Chance Shows," featuring two teams who lost in Season 1.

=== Round 1 ===
Fatone shows the teams four categories, each containing one question. Each question has three multiple-choice options. After a team selects a category, the question and the choices are revealed. Each player on the team secretly locks in their choice without conferring. Correct answers are worth 10 points each, and the team receives an additional 50 points if all three members answer correctly. Each team plays two questions in this round.

=== Round 2 ===
This round is played in the same manner as the first round, except that the point values are doubled (20 points per individual correct answer, and 100 bonus points if all three players are right).

=== Round 3 ===
In this round, the questions are given without multiple-choice options. Each team confers and writes down their answer. The team that chooses the category is given the first opportunity to reveal their answer. Unlike the previous rounds, the opposing team can steal the points with a correct answer if the first team is wrong. Each team's first question is worth 200 points, and their second question is worth 400 points. At the end of this round, the team with the most points wins the game and plays the bonus round for $10,000. If at any time either team cannot catch up, the game ends immediately.

If teams are tied after the third round, the team captains are given one multiple-choice question. Buzzing in with a correct answer wins the game, while a wrong answer loses the game.

The winning team earns $1,000.

=== Bonus round ===
The winning team plays the bonus round for $10,000. The game begins with the first player at the central podium. Fatone asks a series of Common Knowledge questions, each with three choices. The player must answer without conferring with their teammates. As long as the player continues to answer questions correctly, they remain at the podium. A player who answers incorrectly is eliminated from the round, and the next player in line comes up to the podium. The team may pass on one question during the round without penalty.

If the team answers seven questions before all three players are eliminated, their winnings are increased to $10,000.
