= Localish =

American lifestyle TV network

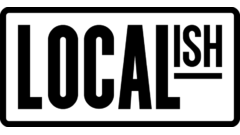
- Type: Division
- Country: United States
- Network: ABC
- Affiliates: ABC O&O TV Stations

Ownership
- Owner: The Walt Disney Company
- Parent: ABC Owned Television Stations

History
- Founded: 2009; 17 years ago
- Launched: April 27, 2009; 17 years ago
- Founder: Emily Barr
- Former names: Live Well HD Network (2009–2010); Live Well Network (2010–2020)

Links
- Website: localish.com

Localish (formerly Live Well Network) is a digital multicast television network owned by ABC Owned Television Stations, a division of Disney.

Localish's 24/7 channel streams on Hulu + Live and on linear TV. Its flagship shows including More in Common and Localish Legends air on ABC in major US cities, Localish.com, and Hulu. As of 2020, Localish reaches an audience of over 17 million TV households and 21 million social followers across ABC's platforms.

== History ==
Disney launched its Localish media venture the week of September 20, 2018. Localish's lineup of TV and digital shows highlight a range of small businesses, local restaurants, and unique neighborhoods across America. With over 70% of its audience under the age of 45, the Localish network reaches millennials via locally sourced video stories released on ABC's digital, social and TV platforms. The first series, More in Common, had already appeared via Facebook Watch on July 21, 2018. The station group considered the possibility of an OTT (over-the-top or online) channel for the brand. A More in Common compilation special was broadcast on all ABC stations' primary channels on November 4, 2018, then on WPVI in Philadelphia on November 3, and on the LiveWell Network subchannel (.2) from November 4 through 11, 2018.

On January 21, 2020, ABC Owned Television Stations announced that the network would be rebranded as Localish on February 17, 2020. The rebranded network serves as an expansion of the Localish brand featuring several programs already featured on the Localish website.

=== As Live Well Network ===
Prior to launching Localish, ABC Owned Television Stations (ABCOTS) began development of a potential subchannel network in 2007. To appeal to ABC affiliates not owned and operated by the network, it was decided not to use ABC branding in any way. Live Well Network was launched on April 27, 2009, in high definition on ABC's owned-and-operated stations as part of the stations' subchannels. Initially, the network only had three hours of original programming that are looped throughout the day which was all sourced from ABC stations. In September 2010, Belo became the first non-ABC group to sign on with the network, adding it to their stations on November 8, 2010. Not all of the Belo-owned stations originally aired the network in widescreen (unlike the ABC group), which led the network to drop the "HD" from its branding to become simply "Live Well Network".

Two LWN owned and operated stations, WJRT and WTVG, were sold to Lilly Broadcasting closing on April 1, 2011. On May 26, 2011, it was announced that a deal has been reached to air the network on nine Scripps-owned stations (several, but not all of them, are ABC affiliates). In August 2011, the network picked up CBC Television's Steven and Chris for broadcast starting that fall.

Logo for Live Well HD Network until 2010

Live Well Network's logo until 2020

On January 9, 2012, Citadel Communications announced that it would be adding Live Well to all five of its major network-affiliated stations (four of them ABC affiliates), bringing the network's reach to around 55% U.S. television households. Young Broadcasting announced the addition of most of their stations to the network as of the end of January 2012; carriage agreements were maintained when Young was purchased by Media General in November 2013.

In 2012, many ABC affiliates switching to the Live Well Network dropped Retro Television Network. A 1-hour two-week LWN block was broadcast on Soapnet weeknights from 11 PM to 12 AM (ET/PT) starting on July 30, 2012, through Friday, August 10, 2012.

The network lost affiliates in Memphis and Jackson, Tennessee in March 2013 as a result of the sale of Newport Television's stations to Nexstar Broadcasting (Nexstar generally does not carry subchannel networks in any form; WHBF-TV in Rock Island, Illinois, acquired by Nexstar in September 2013, eventually dropped LWN at the start of 2014, but it has since been replaced by a standard-definition simulcast of a sister station in the market).

KMCI-TV in Kansas City, Missouri, removed the network in favor of Bounce TV in October 2013, while Salt Lake City, Utah's KSL-TV would add Cozi TV at LWN's expense in January 2014. On February 17, 2014, KMOV in St. Louis dropped the network, as new owner Meredith Corporation plans on using the bandwidth for ATSC M/H mobile DTV, better known by the brand name Dyle (the subchannel was later re-launched to allow the launch of a replacement MyNetworkTV affiliate for the St. Louis area).

The Phoenix DMA is the largest TV market which did not have a Live Well Network affiliate, since Scripps-owned KNXV-TV (an ABC affiliate) switched to Antenna TV in January 2014, citing viewer demand for the classic TV network as the reason for dropping Live Well.

On June 9, 2014, network vice president Peggy Allen and ABC Owned Television Stations president Rebecca Campbell jointly announced to Live Well Network's staff that they planned to shut down the network in January 2015. Campbell and Allen said that despite the success of the network, the division wanted to prioritize "local content" and its "core local news brands". Some of the network's shows may move to the fyi cable network, a network ABC holds a half-interest in with Hearst Corporation via the A&E Networks joint venture. Many of the shows from ABC's stations were expected to end production.

On January 13, 2015, via an announcement by Green Bay affiliate WBAY-TV (and later confirmed by Chicago media writer Robert Feder), ABC announced that the network would be extended for two further months from their previous close date of January 16, 2015 with a revised program schedule to allow their remaining affiliates additional time to find subchannel programming.

Two days later, ABCOTS and the E. W. Scripps Company announced a pickup of Katz Broadcasting's new subchannel Laff, including the DT3 subchannels of the ABC O&O stations, as of April 15, 2015; within that announcement, ABCOTS stated that Live Well Network would continue on their eight stations on their DT2 subchannels in HD, but no longer be distributed outside of ABC O&O stations. As of April 15, 2015, WBAY and all of the former Young stations now owned by Media General continued to run the network, with no mention of any new alternate programming for those subchannels. On May 29, 2015, Comcast was informed that Media General was dropping Live Well from their stations beginning May 30, 2015. Subsequently, the signal was pulled off the Media General stations at the close of business on May 29, with those stations either carrying still text cards apologizing for the end of the network and announcements of replacement programming to come, or carrying alternate station programming. On October 31, 2015, the network lost its final affiliate station outside of the ABC O&O stations, Sinclair Broadcast Group's WJLA-DT3 in Washington, DC, replacing it with the company's newest subchannel network Comet.

As Localish

The network was rebranded as Localish in 2020. It is available on many free TV streaming services including ABC.com, Tubi, and DirecTV's free streaming platform, MyFree Directv. It is also available on pay TV services such as Hulu + Live and Fubo.

== Programming ==
=== As Live Well Network ===
Many of the network's shows were produced by the local ABC Owned Television Stations. Initially, the network only had three hours of original programming that looped throughout the day, all sourced from ABC stations. The network expanded to six hours of original programming on January 11, 2011, when six more half-hour shows were added allowing the programming block to loop three times daily; with rotating episodes to ensure a given episode would not air more than twice in a day.

By July 2011, the network was scheduling 18 hours of original programming with 1 hour set aside for local programming. In September 2011, 3 hours of children's E/I shows were added. In February 2014, WPVI-TV Philadelphia and LWN were looking for participants for a pilot episode of Pop the Question, a reality series featuring wedding proposals.

FYI, a cable specialty channel partly owned by Disney through A&E Networks, took over some of Live Well Network's programs with the network's contraction. Sweet Retreats was picked up starting on October 10, 2014, by FYI.

Sourcing	Production co.	Show title	Start date	End date	Host(s)	Description
ABC Station	KABC-TV	Advice for Life	April 2009	August 25, 2010	Maria Brandwynne, Life coach; Dr. Rick Shuman, psychotherapist	General advice
ABC Station	KGO-TV	Home with Lisa Quinn	April 2009		Lisa Quinn	One room make overs
ABC Station	WLS-TV	Let's Dish	April 2009		Chef Chris Koetke, Dean of the School of Culinary Arts at Kendall College	Cooking show
ABC Station	KTRK-TV	Mirror Mirror	April 2009		Rebecca Spera	Fashion and beauty tips
ABC Station	KFSN-TV & 18Thirty Entertainment	Motion	April 2009	2015	Greg Aiello	Outdoor travel show
ABC Station	WLS-TV and Answers Media, LLC	Say Ahh...	April 2009	2011	Jane Hanson; Dr. Gerald Chodak; Belma Michael Johnson; Dr. Ted Epperly; Dawn Jackson Blatner	Health and medical news
ABC Station	WPVI-TV	Mary Talks Money	January 11, 2010	2011	Mary Caraccioli	A financial advice and literacy show
ABC Station	WABC-TV	Gotta Know	January 11, 2010	August 3, 2010	Heidi Jones	A high-tech gadget show
ABC Station	KGO-TV	Everyday Living	January 11, 2010	2011	Janelle Wang	Lifestyle show
ABC Station	KABC-TV	Custom Fit	fall 2010	2012	Lori Corbin, food and fitness coach	Health living series covering a range of topics from dieting to workout routines
ABC Station	KGO-TV	Good Cookin’	fall 2010		Bruce Aidells, a chef, food commentator and best-selling author	Cooking program
ABC Station	WLS-TV	Here's How, Right Now	fall 2010	2012	former HGTV host Joel Schmarje	Provides instructions on non-professional needed household projects
ABC Station	KABC-TV	OTRC: On the Red Carpet	fall 2010	2013	Rachel Smith and Chris Balish	Entertainment magazine
ABC Station	WPVI-TV	We Owe What?	January 12, 2012		Mary Caraccioli	Host helps family with debt
ABC Station	KFSN-TV & 18Thirty Entertainment	My Family Recipe Rocks	January 12, 2012		Joey Fatone	Home cooking
ABC Station	KABC-TV	Live Big with Ali Vincent	September 4, 2011		Ali Vincent	Weight loss & activities
ABC Station	KGO-TV	Food Rush	September 8, 2012		Ryan Scott	Follows a chef as he works his catering business, food truck and the opening of a new restaurant
ABC Station	KTRK-TV	Deals			Consumer reporter Kat Cosley	Donors or finding money-saving tips
ABC Station		Miss America: Secrets Revealed	January 7, 2013	January 11, 2013	Rebecca Spera	Contestants makeup, beauty and other tips
ABC Station	KTRK-TV	Home Chef Showdown	June 22, 2014	June 24, 2014	Ryan Scott	Home cooks face off judged by a panel of chefs in this special three episode series
ABC Station	WPVI-TV	Knock It Off!	July 6, 2014		Monica Mangin; Jess Jackson	13 episodes; low cost one room make over
ABC Station	WPVI-TV	Sweet Retreats		October 10, 2014	Rene Syler	
Outside	Answers Media	Save My Planet	January 11, 2010	2012		Eco-info series
Outside	Canada syndicated	My Green House	January 11, 2010	2012		An "Extreme Home Makeover" like show
Outside	Frontera Media Productions & Luminair Film Productions	Mexico: One Plate At A Time	January 11, 2010		Rick Bayless	From (PBS) network Mexican food series
Outside	Associated Television International	Laura McKenzie's Traveler	fall 2010		Laura McKenzie	Travel to various sought-after destinations
Outside	Entertainment Concepts International	Treasure Hunters Roadshow	fall 2010	2013	Andy St. Clair	Seeks out eclectic collector's items
Outside	CBC Television	Steven and Chris	September 12, 2011	2016	Steven Sabados; Chris Hyndman	Lifestyle talk show, Series canceled in 2015 following Chris Hyndman's death
Outside	Basil Street Media	Food for Thought with Claire Thomas			Claire Thomas	Program from ABC's syndicated block Litton's Weekend Adventure for FCC E/I compliance; cooking
Outside	Everyday Health	Everyday Health			Laila Ali; Jenna Morasca; Ethan Zohn	E/I Litton program; health and wellness
Outside	Everyday Health & Truim	Recipe Rehab			Daniel Boome	E/I Litton program; cooking and health
Outside	The Television Syndication Company	Real Life 101			Christie and Shawn	E/I program; career exploration
Outside	Hiring America, LLC	Hiring America	2019	2020	Gigi Stone Woods	Assisting veterans in finding jobs
Outside	E. W. Scripps Company; Happy Entertainment; Sandbox Entertainment	Pickler & Ben	2019	2020	Kellie Pickler; Ben Aaron	Syndicated day time variety show
Outside	Brandstar	Military Makeover			R. Lee Ermey	Home improvement for veterans
Outside	Brandstar	The Balancing Act			Julie Moran and Olga Villaverde	Advertorial

=== Localish ===
Localish content was originally available via online (ABC.com and stations' website, ABC apps), its over-the-top platforms (Roku, Apple TV, Amazon Fire TV), social media (Facebook Watch, Twitter, YouTube Instagram) and syndicated by Oath and Apple News.

Show title	Start date	End date	Production co.	Host(s)	Description
More in Common	July 21, 2018				Launched on Facebook Watch
Secretly Awesome	September 20, 2018				Locals' top spots
My Go-To	September 20, 2018				Local influencers showing their favorite hangouts
Worth the Wait	September 20, 2018				Looks into if the wait at the hotspots is really worth it
Staycation	October 2018				A travel series
Bite Sized	October 2018				Food series
Pumped	October 2018				Fitness series
All Good	February 17, 2020				Features people making positive change
Glam Lab	February 17, 2020				Beauty and self-care newest products and trends tested
Out of Office	February 17, 2020				Vacation videos
Stroke of Genius	February 17, 2020				Finding the inspiration behind America's most talented artists

== Video quality ==
The network broadcasts in a lower-bandwidth form of 720p HD format in order to preserve bandwidth for the main HD station signal and additional 480i digital subchannels.

Cable carriage is also featured in the ABC O&O markets (for example Xfinity in Chicago, Fresno, Houston, Philadelphia, and San Francisco; Spectrum in Los Angeles and the Research Triangle; Optimum in New York City), either as a full HD feed or a 480i standard definition version. As of December 2017, WLS-TV only carries a standard definition version of the network due to a channel sharing agreement with UniMas station WXFT-DT which requires a high definition broadcast of that station.

== Affiliates ==
Localish is available over-the-air as a digital subchannel of the following stations:

List of Localish affiliates
Media market	State	Station	Channel
Fresno	California	KFSN-DT2	30.2
Los Angeles	California	KABC-DT2	7.2
San Francisco	California	KGO-DT2	7.2
Chicago	Illinois	WLS-DT2	7.2
Raleigh–Durham	North Carolina	WTVD-DT2	11.2
New York City	New York	WABC-DT2	7.2
Philadelphia	Pennsylvania	WPVI-DT2	6.2
Houston	Texas	KTRK-DT2	13.2
