= The Goods (talk show) =

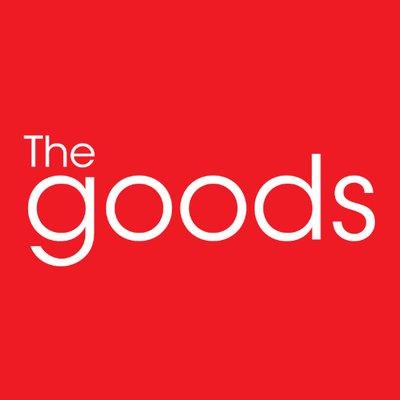
- Created by: Portia Corman
- Presented by: Steven Sabados; Jessi Cruickshank; Andrea Bain; Shahir Massoud
- Country of origin: Canada
- No. of seasons: 2

Production
- Production locations: Canadian Broadcasting Centre; Toronto, Ontario
- Running time: 60 minutes
- Production company: Canadian Broadcasting Corporation

Original release
- Network: CBC Television
- Release: October 3, 2016 – May 10, 2018

The Goods was a Canadian daytime television talk show which aired on CBC Television from October 3, 2016 to May 10, 2018. Formatted as a lifestyle show, each of the four hosts specialized in a different subject area: Steven Sabados on home and design, Jessi Cruickshank on style and fashion, Andrea Bain on relationships and sexuality, and Shahir Massoud on food. The show was created as a replacement for Sabados' earlier CBC series Steven and Chris, which was cancelled in 2015 following the death of his husband and co-host Chris Hyndman.

CBC announced that the series was cancelled after two seasons on April 17, 2018. The final episode aired on May 10, 2018.

The Goods was nominated for a Canadian Screen Award for Best Lifestyle Program or Series at the 6th Canadian Screen Awards in 2018.
