= Last Singer Standing =

Irish reality television series

- Genre: Reality competition
- Presented by: Nicky Byrne
- Judges: Nadine Coyle; Joey Fatone; Samantha Mumba
- Country of origin: Ireland
- Original language: English
- No. of series: 1
- No. of episodes: 8

Production
- Running time: 60 minutes (inc. adverts)
- Production company: ShinAwiL

Original release
- Network: RTÉ One
- Release: 23 October 2021 – present

Last Singer Standing is an Irish singing competition show that was first broadcast on 23 October 2021 on RTÉ One.

== Production ==
On 30 June 2021, Nicky Byrne was announced as the host of a new RTÉ One singing competition show called, Take On Me. Applications for the show were announced that same day. On 18 August 2021, RTÉ announced at their new season launch the show had been renamed, Last Singer Standing and Nicky would be joined by a panel of three pop music experts, Girls Aloud singer, Nadine Coyle, *NSYNC member, Joey Fatone and singer-songwriter, Samantha Mumba.

The series was the first production to be filmed in Font Hill Studios.

== Contestants ==
Contestant	Age	Location	Debut	Status
Patrick O'Sullivan	27	Cork	Show 5	Winner
Caroline Bailey	32	Cork	Show 3	Runner-up
Tony Cunningham	33	Galway	Show 2	Third place
Rachael Farrell	35	Laois	Show 3	Fourth place
Dame Stuffy	32	Dublin	Show 3	Fifth place
Janet Grogan	33	Dublin	Show 2	Sixth place
Alex King	24	Dublin	Show 1	Seventh place
Christiana Underwood	29	Cork	Show 7	Eliminated (Show 7)
Ciara O'Donoghue	30	Kerry	Show 7	Eliminated (Show 7)
Doireann O'Connor	29	Laois	Show 6	Eliminated (Show 7)
Sope Adeniranye	23	Meath	Show 6	Eliminated (Show 7)
Joe Geoghegan	52	Dublin	Show 5	Eliminated (Show 7)
Cathal Mulhern	32	Donegal	Show 7	Eliminated (Show 7)
Tommy Röckit	37	Dublin	Show 7	Eliminated (Show 7)
Mark O'Donnell	20	Donegal	Show 6	Eliminated (Show 6)
Carl Connie Lingus	38	Antrim	Show 5	Eliminated (Show 6)
Damien McElligott	45	Dublin	Show 6	Eliminated (Show 6)
Ciara Rose Burke	32	Dublin	Show 4	Eliminated (Show 5)
Lee Tomkins	35	Dublin	Show 4	Eliminated (Show 5)
Micah Carley	32	Tipperary	Show 5	Eliminated (Show 5)
Grace Foley	35	Kerry	Show 4	Eliminated (Show 4)
Aaron Matthews	22	Louth	Show 1	Eliminated (Show 4)
Adam Grimes	22	Meath	Show 4	Eliminated (Show 4)
Charlotte Hyland	26	Wicklow	Show 2	Eliminated (Show 3)
Anna O'Connor	37	Tipperary	Show 2	Eliminated (Show 3)
Sean Boland	50	Dublin	Show 3	Eliminated (Show 3)
Charley White	22	Dublin	Show 1	Eliminated (Show 2)
Evelyn Akinade	18	Dublin	Show 1	Eliminated (Show 2)
Grace Dunne	52	Meath	Show 1	Eliminated (Show 2)
Anna Bergin	24	Laois	Show 1	Eliminated (Show 1)
Basit Eniafe	27	Dublin	Show 1	Eliminated (Show 1)
Dean Anthony	37	Dublin	Show 1	Eliminated (Show 1)

== Results summary ==
Contestant	Show 1			Show 2			Show 3			Show 4			Show 5			Show 6			Show 7			The Final	
Patrick																						Winner	
Caroline																						Runner-up	
Tony																						Third place	
Rachael																						Fourth place	
Dame Stuffy																						Fifth place	
Janet																						Sixth place	
Alex																						Seventh place	
Christiana																							
Ciara																							
Doireann																							
Sope																							
Joe																							
Cathal																							
Tommy																							
Mark																							
Carl																							
Damien																							
Ciara Rose																							
Lee																							
Micah																							
Grace F.																							
Aaron																							
Adam																							
Charlotte																							
Anna O.																							
Sean																							
Charley																							
Evelyn																							
Grace D.																							
Anna B.																							
Basit																							
Dean																							
Eliminated (votes)	Dean (0 of 3)	Basit (2 of 5)	Anna B. (41%)	Grace D. (0 of 3)	Evelyn (1 of 5)	Charley (8%)	Sean (1 of 3)	Anna O. (1 of 5)	Charlotte (28%)	Adam (0 of 3)	Aaron (0 of 5)	Grace F. (38%)	Micah (1 of 3)	Lee (1 of 5)	Ciara Rose (14%)	Damien (0 of 3)	Carl (1 of 5)	Mark (33%)	Tommy (0 of 3)	Cathal (0 of 5)	Joe (14%)	Alex; Fewest votes (out of 7)	Janet; Fewest votes (out of 6)
Eliminated (votes)	Dean (0 of 3)	Basit (2 of 5)	Anna B. (41%)	Grace D. (0 of 3)	Evelyn (1 of 5)	Charley (8%)	Sean (1 of 3)	Anna O. (1 of 5)	Charlotte (28%)	Adam (0 of 3)	Aaron (0 of 5)	Grace F. (38%)	Micah (1 of 3)	Lee (1 of 5)	Ciara Rose (14%)	Damien (0 of 3)	Carl (1 of 5)	Mark (33%)	Tommy (0 of 3)	Cathal (0 of 5)	Joe (14%)	Dame Stuffy; Fewest votes (out of 5)	Rachael; Fewest votes (out of 4)
Eliminated (votes)	Dean (0 of 3)	Basit (2 of 5)	Anna B. (41%)	Grace D. (0 of 3)	Evelyn (1 of 5)	Charley (8%)	Sean (1 of 3)	Anna O. (1 of 5)	Charlotte (28%)	Adam (0 of 3)	Aaron (0 of 5)	Grace F. (38%)	Micah (1 of 3)	Lee (1 of 5)	Ciara Rose (14%)	Damien (0 of 3)	Carl (1 of 5)	Mark (33%)	Tommy (0 of 3)	Cathal (0 of 5)	Christiana, Ciara, Doireann, Sope (not chosen)	Tony; Fewest votes (out of 3)	Caroline; Fewest votes (out of 2)
Eliminated (votes)	Dean (0 of 3)	Basit (2 of 5)	Anna B. (41%)	Grace D. (0 of 3)	Evelyn (1 of 5)	Charley (8%)	Sean (1 of 3)	Anna O. (1 of 5)	Charlotte (28%)	Adam (0 of 3)	Aaron (0 of 5)	Grace F. (38%)	Micah (1 of 3)	Lee (1 of 5)	Ciara Rose (14%)	Damien (0 of 3)	Carl (1 of 5)	Mark (33%)	Tommy (0 of 3)	Cathal (0 of 5)	Christiana, Ciara, Doireann, Sope (not chosen)	Patrick (most votes to win)	

- Indicates the finalist that finished as the winner
- Indicates the finalist that finished as runner-up
- Indicates the finalists that finished from seventh to third place
- Indicates the singer was not yet in the competition
- Indicates the singer won the round
- Indicates the singer won the third round and advanced to The Final
- Indicates the singer bypassed these shows as they had already qualified
- Indicates the singer was eliminated
- Indicates the singers that were not chosen to perform in the very last round and therefore were automatically eliminated
- Indicates the singer in control of the game
- Indicates a singer that challenged in the round
- Indicates a singer that didn't challenge, but was selected to sing by the singer in control of the game

== Format ==
=== Round 1 ===
Each episode features eight players. At the top of each episode, one player is randomly selected to play the game. The contestant steps up and will have to choose a song that could help keep their place on the show. However, as they are performing, the other contestants can buzz in and challenge the contestant. The original player must select one of the contestants to face off against, this contestant will then step up and sing a different song. At the end of Round One, the panel votes on who is progressing.

=== Round 2 ===
For Round Two, the winner stays on and we run through the process again, this time, with different song options. However, at the end of Round Two, it’s the fellow contestants who vote one by one on who is remaining in the game after two singers have performed.

=== Round 3 ===
Once again, the winner stays on into Round Three, where new song options are presented and more people challenge. At the end of this round, the show turns to the studio audience for the final decision. They select who that show’s Last Singer Standing is and is therefore advancing to the final. The four players who never had a chance to play or perform will return the following week, alongside four brand new players, to play the game all over again.

=== The Final ===
After seven weeks, the seven champions from the seven previous episodes battle it out in the final where one of them will be crowned Last Singer Standing, taking home a cash prize of €25,000. The result is decided by a combination of votes from the studio audience, the panel and the twenty-five eliminated contestants.
