= My Family Recipe Rocks =

- Presented by: Joey Fatone
- Country of origin: United States
- Original language: English
- No. of seasons: 3
- No. of episodes: 55

Production
- Running time: 30 minutes

Original release
- Network: Live Well Network
- Release: January 14, 2012 – present

My Family Recipe Rocks is a television cooking show hosted by Joey Fatone. The show is produced for Live Well Network by Executive Producer Jeff Aiello for Fresno, California ABC O&O station KFSN-TV.

== The show ==
In each episode, Host, Joey Fatone visits a different American city to meet someone known in their community for a signature recipe. He and the show's crew spend a day in the person's kitchen and Fatone helps the cook prepare the recipe for his/her friends and family and share stories and family memories pertaining to the recipe and the cook's family.

== Episodes ==
No.	Title	Directed by	Written by	Original release date
1	"North Carolina Pulled Pork"	Unknown	Jeff Aiello	January 14, 2012
Joey visits Andy and Jean Fies, well-known on Evanston, Illinois' Lincolnwood Drive for their recipe for North Carolina Pulled Pork sandwiches. Joey and Andy prepare the pork for all-day grilling(over indirect heat), then shred the meat for sandwiches served at the street's annual block party.
2	"Chirba Chirba Dumpling Truck"	Unknown	Jeff Aiello	January 14, 2012
Joey visits the crew of the Chirba Chirba dumpling truck in Durham, North Carolina and helps them prepare, steam and sell their Chinese dumplings at one of their daily stops in the city.
3	"Chicken and Edamame over Rice"	Unknown	Jeff Aiello	January 14, 2012
Joey visits retirees Adrienne and Manny Munos in their West Palm Beach, Florida home for a gut-busting afternoon as he helps them prepare their recipe for Chicken and Edamame over Rice.
4	"Spaghetti with the Fish"	Unknown	Jeff Aiello	January 21, 2012
Joey visits Cheryl Cannistra and her family in the Chicago suburb of Willow Springs to help them prepare a fish spaghetti recipe handed down in the family for generations.
5	"Frostbitten Collard Greens"	Unknown	Jeff Aiello	February 4, 2012
Joey visits Fred Thompson and his son-in-law Kyle in Raleigh, North Carolina to help them make Fred's mother's recipe for frostbitten collard greens.
6	"Mama Shrimp"	Unknown	Jeff Aiello	February 17, 2012
Joey visits former flight attendant Lori Kline at her home in Lake Worth, Florida and helps her make her "Mama Shrimp"(shrimp and crawfish in a spicy cream sauce over pasta) for a reunion of former pilots and flight attendants Lori worked with at the now-defunct Air Florida.
7	"Spaghetti and Mean Balls"	Unknown	Jeff Aiello	March 3, 2012
Joey visits Cara James Beltran at a friend's home in Fresno, California to help her make her spaghetti sauce with meatballs she calls "mean balls" and experience her hobby of driving off-road in her lifted Jeep.
8	"At Home with the Scintas"	Unknown	Jeff Aiello	March 10, 2012
Joey visits the Scinta family, who he has known for ten years. The Buffalo, New York natives have entertained audiences for a decade with their music and comedy show in Las Vegas, Nevada. Joey joins Chrissi, Frankie and Joe Scinta and their "adopted brother" Pete O'Donnell to make Sausage Patty sandwiches, Grilled Buffalo Chicken Wings and Stuffed Artichokes.
9	"Mediterranean Chicken with Quinoa"	Unknown	Jeff Aiello	March 24, 2012
Joey visits Lorraine Brown at her home in North Barrington, Illinois, near Chicago. He helps Lorraine prepare a favorite recipe of hers and her husband, Greg, for Mediterranean Chicken with Quinoa and Lorraine shares memories of her mother, who died in 2004, and her time as a cheerleader in the National Football League(as a Chicago Bears' "Honeybear" [she was one of the first seven members of the group]) and National Basketball Association(as a Chicago Bulls' "Luvabull" [the same seven from the original group of "Honeybears" were the first "Luvabulls"].
10	"For the Love of Spam!"	Unknown	Jeff Aiello	May 5, 2012
Joey visits the Cortez family in Clovis, California and, after some bass fishing, they share with him some Spam dishes they brought back with them after spending several years living in Hawaii.
11	"Women Who Wine"	Unknown	Jeff Aiello	May 26, 2012
Joey returns to Las Vegas to meet with a group of women who call themselves the "Women Who Wine", who meet every week for good food, laughter, dancing and, of course, wine. They are like sisters and share in each other's joy and pain. The "WWW" support each other no matter what and when they get together. They line dance, paint wine glasses and create great recipes that always include wine.
12	"Atwal Family Prepares Indian Delights"	Unknown	Jeff Aiello	June 23, 2012
Joey visits a microbiologist and her Indian family in San Jose, California, with strong traditions who share their incredible blend of culture and food. Roopi Atwal lives at home with her parents, Prabi and Kirpal, brother Bobby and sister Rampi. Her grandparents, also live there, were on a vacation when Joey came to visit. They have strong values, practice their religion based in the Sikh faith and are steeped in strong cultural traditions. A large part of their culture is food, which is why they believe it is important to cook together and grow their own vegetables in their backyard garden. Prabi teaches Joey how to make pakora -- a fried vegetarian dish that is served with homemade mint chutney. While Prabi cooks the pakora, Joey rubbed his eyes after cutting the chili peppers, which resulted in an intense burn. But Roopi came to the rescue with a milk wash that cooled his eye in no time. Roopi warns that you should always wash your hands after handling peppers. Roopi and Rampi make Joey their favorite summertime drink, a mango lassi (a cool smoothie drink is made with fresh mango and mango pulp, homemade Indian yogurt, milk and honey) and a traditional Indian rice pudding called Kheer(a blend of rice and milk with a few special spices, which is slow cooked for hours over the stove or in a crock pot). The Atwal family shows us how much family and food are a part of their lives. The family plans their meals together, cooks together, eats together and prays together, all elements of a strong Indian culture.
