= Joey Fatone =

American pop singer and actor (born 1977)

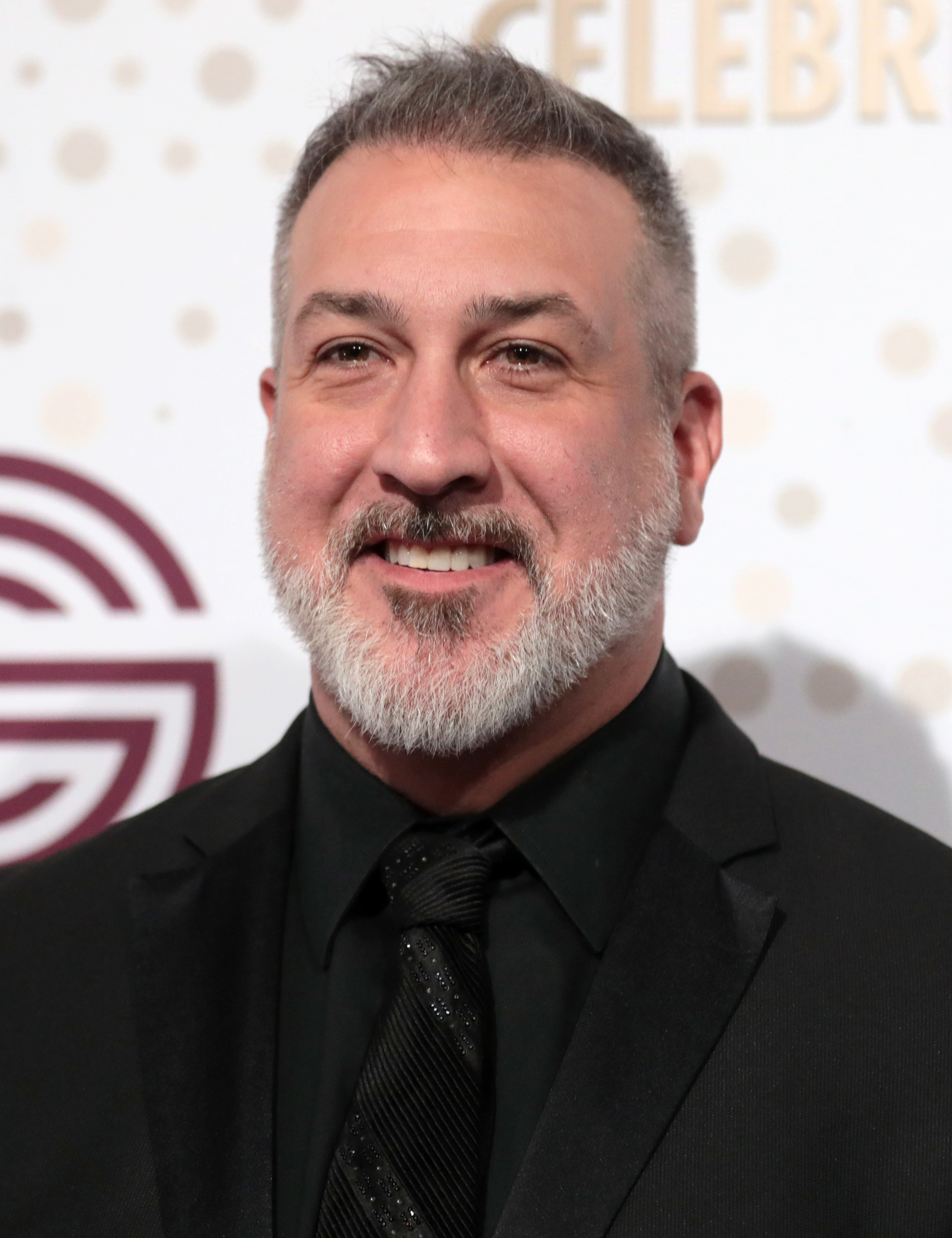
- Fatone in 2023

Background information
- Born: Joseph Anthony Fatone Jr. January 28, 1977 (age 49); New York City, U.S.
- Origin: Orlando, Florida, U.S.
- Genre: Pop
- Occupations: Singer, actor, television host
- Years active: 1995–present
- Formerly of: NSYNC
- Spouse: Kelly Baldwin (m. 2004; div. 2019)

Joseph Anthony Fatone Jr. (born January 28, 1977) is an American singer, dancer, actor, television host and businessman. He is best known as a member of the boy band NSYNC, in which he sang baritone. The band has sold over 70 million records, becoming one of the best-selling boy bands of all time.

In 2007, he came in second place on the ABC reality show Dancing with the Stars. He was the host of the American and Australian versions of The Singing Bee, which aired on NBC in the United States. Fatone was the announcer for the game show Family Feud from 2010 to 2015. Fatone has hosted on Food Network's Rewrapped, Game Show Network's Common Knowledge, Live Well Network's My Family Recipe Rocks, The Price Is Right Live! at Bally's Las Vegas; and appeared as "Rabbit" on the first season of The Masked Singer in 2019.

== Early life and education ==
Fatone was born in Brooklyn, New York City, to Joe and Phyllis Fatone. He has a brother, Steven, and a sister, Janine, and was raised at 2140 84th Street in the Bensonhurst neighborhood. His father had sung in a doo-wop group called the Orions. At 13, he moved with his family to Orlando, Florida, where he attended Dr. Phillips High School. He also appeared as a contestant on the children's game show Nick Arcade.

== Career ==
=== NSYNC ===
After high school, Fatone played "Wolfie" in Beetlejuice's Rock and Roll Graveyard Revue at Universal Studios Florida in Orlando. There, in the summer of 1995, he befriended fellow park performer Chris Kirkpatrick who recruited him as the fourth member of a new vocal group that included Justin Timberlake and JC Chasez. They were later joined by Lance Bass, and the band NSYNC was formed. Fatone sang baritone with the band from their formation to 2002, when they went on an indefinite hiatus, during which time they sold more than 70 million records worldwide. He performed lead vocals on the single "Together Again" and the No Strings Attached album track "I Thought She Knew". While a member of NSYNC, Fatone co-starred with bandmate Bass in the 2001 romantic comedy film On the Line and guest-starred with the band on The Simpsons episode, "New Kids on the Blecch".

On August 25, 2013, NSYNC regrouped for a one-off performance at the 2013 MTV Video Music Awards. They performed a medley of "Girlfriend" and "Bye Bye Bye"; after the performance Lance Bass said that the group had no plans for a reunion tour or new music. In April 2019 the band reunited without Timberlake for a one-off performance with Ariana Grande at the Coachella Valley Music and Arts Festival. NSYNC have long been subject to speculation of a reunion, to which Fatone has answered: "Never say never".

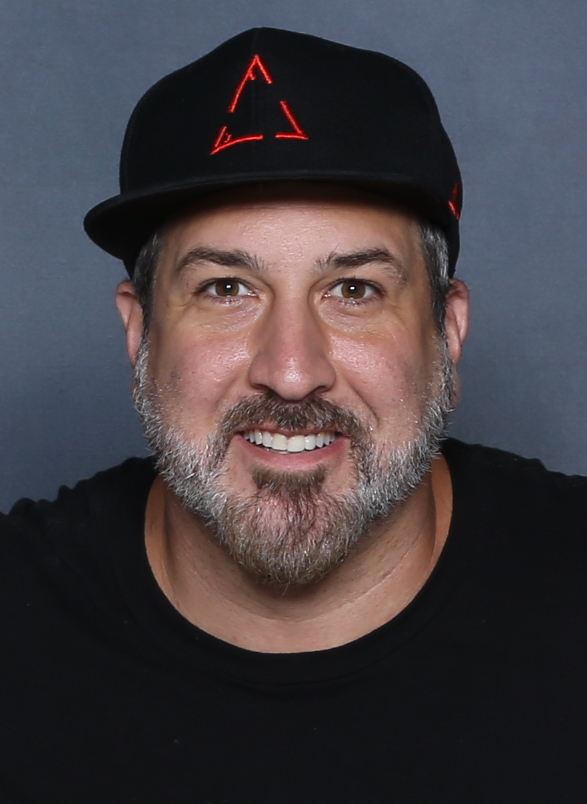
Fatone in 2018

On September 12, 2023, following weeks of teasers and speculation regarding a potential reunion, all five members appeared together at the 2023 MTV Video Music Awards to present the Best Pop Award. On September 14, it was confirmed the group recorded a new song entitled "Better Place" for the DreamWorks Animation film Trolls Band Together. The song was released on September 29, 2023, reaching No. 1 on the US and Canadian iTunes Charts, No. 4 on the Global and European iTunes Charts and No. 25 on the Billboard Hot 100.

In the wake of the new single's release, Fatone said there were no immediate plans for more music from NSYNC, but the band could release a new album within the next two years, subject to the success of "Better Place" and the involvement of Timberlake.

=== Acting ===
In 2002, Fatone played Cousin Angelo in the comedy film My Big Fat Greek Wedding, a role he reprised in the TV spin-off My Big Fat Greek Life and the 2016 sequel. In the same year, he made his Broadway debut, playing the lead in Rent at the Nederlander Theatre in New York. He went on to act in the critically acclaimed movie The Cooler and had minor roles in the experimental film Red Riding Hood and Homie Spumoni, the latter alongside Jamie-Lynn Sigler. He returned to Broadway in 2004 in a revival of Little Shop of Horrors and later appeared in productions of The Producers and 42nd Street in Pittsburgh and Rock of Ages at Bally's Las Vegas.

Fatone played himself in the kung fu skit "Enter the Fat One" in the first season of Robot Chicken, later making more appearances on the show, including the first Star Wars episode. He also played himself in the Syfy film Jersey Shore Shark Attack, the TV series Return of the Mac, and the Comedy Central feature Cursed Friends. Fatone has guest-starred in the Disney Channel series Hannah Montana, Imagination Movers and Kim Possible in addition to various other TV shows and horror films, including Inkubus (2011) and Dead 7 (2016). He reprised his role as Angelo in My Big Fat Greek Wedding 3 (2023), and he also lent his voice to Trolls Band Together playing the character Ablaze. He once again lent his voice to an episode of Superkitties in 2025.

=== Presenting ===
Fatone was the "ringmaster" for NBC's reality series Celebrity Circus in 2005. In 2007, he hosted NBC's The Singing Bee and the Australian version of the show on Nine Network. The same year, he became a red carpet host for TV Guide along with Lisa Rinna. In 2009 Fatone co-hosted the live pre-show for TNA Wrestling's biggest annual pay-per-view event, TNA Bound for Glory, alongside Jeremy Borash.

From 2010 to 2015, Fatone served as the announcer for host Steve Harvey on the show Family Feud. At the same time he hosted the Live Well Network series My Family Recipe Rocks, the Food Network cooking competition Rewrapped, and Parents Just Don't Understand series on the Hub Network. He also was a celebrity guest host of The Price Is Right Live! at Bally's Las Vegas. In January 2012, Fatone was one of eight celebrities participating in the Food Network reality series Rachael vs. Guy: Celebrity Cook-Off. Though eliminated in week six, he secured a $5,000 award for his charity, the Fatone Family Foundation.

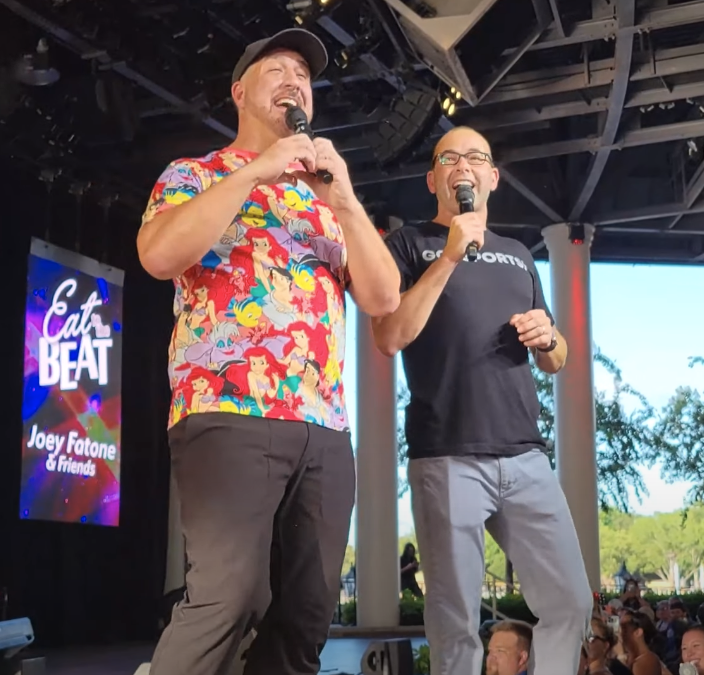
Fatone performing with James Murray of the Impractical Jokers in 2022

In February 2014, Fatone made an appearance on the hidden camera show Impractical Jokers, standing in for show regular Brian Quinn, during a challenge. He made repeat appearances on the show as host or featured guest in a number of specials, including a 2017 episode based at his Orlando hot dog restaurant, Fat One's. Fatone is the permanent host of the spin-off series Impractical Jokers: After Party and he made a cameo in Impractical Jokers: The Movie in 2020. In 2024, Fatone was the celebrity guest on the show and filled in as the "fourth joker" for the episode, meaning he was eligible to lose a challenge and was subjected to a punishment consisting of a series of the Jokers' past punishments.

Fatone portrayed "Rabbit" on the first season of the singing competition show The Masked Singer, tying with Rumer Willis as "Lion" for fourth place overall. Currently he is presenter of the game show Common Knowledge, which premiered on January 14, 2019, on the Game Show Network. In 2021 he served as a panelist on the Irish talent show Last Singer Standing.

=== Dancing with the Stars ===
On February 1, 2007, the ABC television network announced that Fatone would participate in season 4 of the American version of Dancing with the Stars, which debuted March 19, 2007. He ended up placing second, losing the mirror ball to Apolo Anton Ohno and Julianne Hough. He competed with professional partner Kym Johnson. Fatone participated in the 15th season of Dancing with the Stars for a second chance to win a mirror ball trophy, again dancing with Kym Johnson. They were the second couple eliminated. He later returned in season 27 during Trio Week as a trio partner to John Schneider and Emma Slater.

In February 2013, Fatone appeared on Holland America Line's "Dancing with the Stars at Sea", aboard the MS Eurodam. He returned to Dancing with the Stars at Sea on Holland America Line's MS Nieuw Amsterdam in January 2014. He was paired with Lacey Schwimmer and appeared alongside Mark Ballas, Sabrina Bryan, and a dance ensemble. Unlike the TV show, this was not a competition, and there were no eliminations.

=== Restaurants ===
Fatone is co-owners with Joe Mulvihill of the Fat One's Hot Dogs & Italian Ice restaurant in Orlando. It originally opened in 2016 at The Florida Mall, before it opened as a food truck in 2018. The restaurant is located at the CityWalk complex at the Universal Orlando Resort As of September 2026.

== Personal life ==
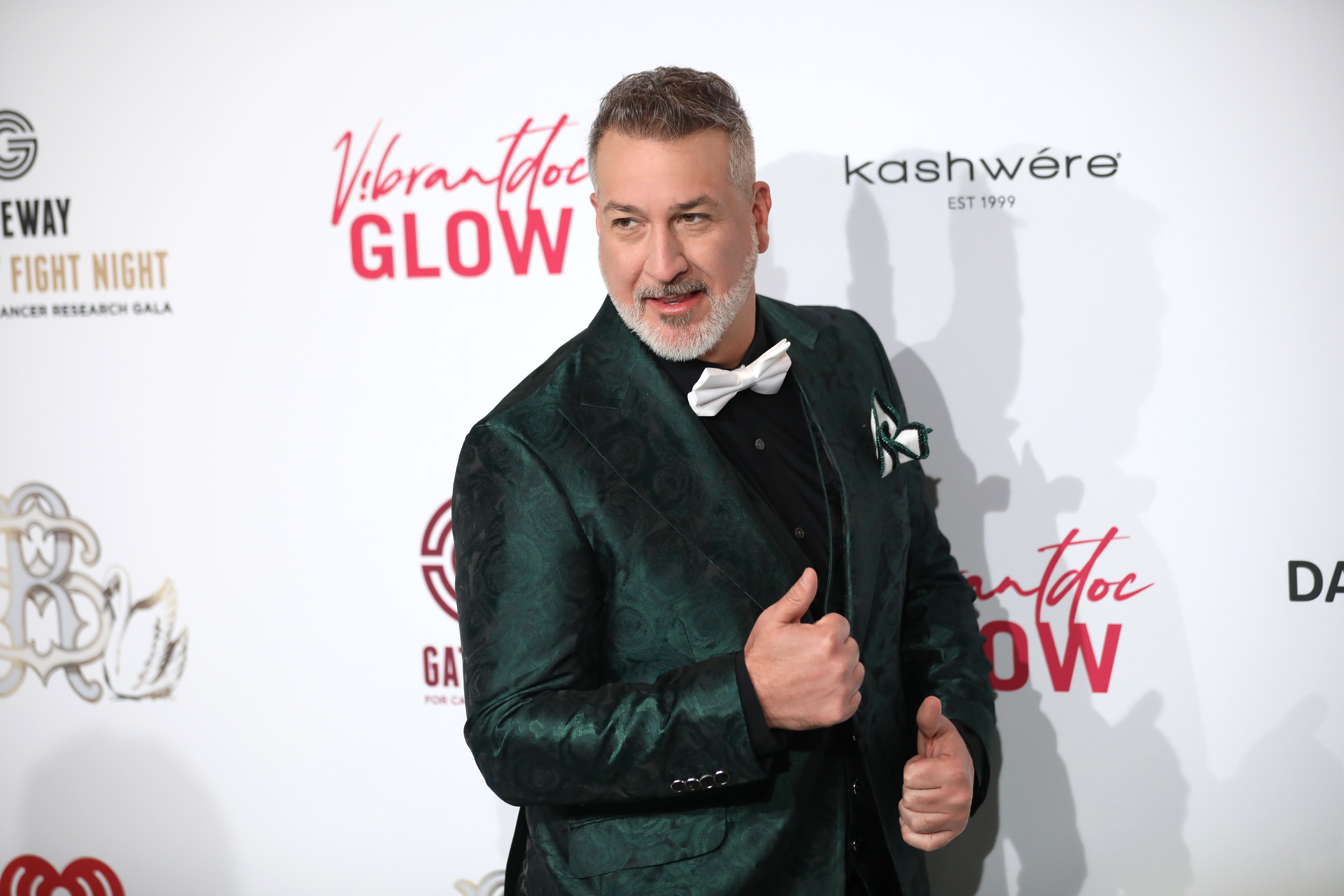
Fatone on the red carpet in 2024

Fatone met his wife, Kelly Baldwin, while they were still in high school in 1993. After joining NSYNC two years later, their relationship was off-and-on.

It was a much speculated rumor that Fatone had briefly dated singer Pink in early 2000, to which Pink stated, "[Joey] took me to Friendly's as a casual date, not like a date-date. I just wanted ice cream. We were in the friend zone." The singer has stated that although they did technically go on a date, it was more platonic and that Fatone was "a total sweetheart."

After rekindling his romance with Baldwin shortly after the same year, she became pregnant in the spring of 2000 with their first child, Briahna, who was born exactly a year after the release of NSYNC's hit sophomore album, No Strings Attached. They became engaged in the fall of 2002.

On September 9, 2004, Fatone married Baldwin at Oheka Castle on Long Island, New York, in a ceremony that was attended by all his NSYNC bandmates. Fatone and his wife have two daughters: Briahna Joely, born March 21, 2001, and Kloey, born January 2010. Fatone's best friend, Lance Bass, is their godfather.

On May 13, 2019, Fatone filed for divorce from Baldwin.

== Discography ==
=== NSYNC ===
- NSYNC (1997)
- No Strings Attached (2000)
- Celebrity (2001)

== Stage work ==
- Rent – Mark Cohen (2002) - Broadway
- Little Shop of Horrors – Seymour Krelborn (2004) - Broadway
- The Producers – Franz Liebkind (2010)
- 42nd Street – Bert Barry (2013)
- Rock of Ages – Dennis (2015)
- & Juliet - Lance (2025-2026) - Broadway
- & Juliet - Lance (2026) - Orlando, Florida

== Filmography ==
=== Film ===
Year	Title	Role	Notes
2000	Longshot	Pizza Chef	
2001	On the Line	Rod	
2002	My Big Fat Greek Wedding	Angelo	
2002	Star Wars: Episode II - Attack of the Clones	Jedi	Cameo; deleted scene
2003	The Cooler	Johnny Cappella	
2006	Red Riding Hood	Jack	
2006	Homie Spumoni	Buddy	
2013	Army of the Damned	Dave	
2016	My Big Fat Greek Wedding 2	Angelo	
2016	Dead 7	Whiskey Joe	
2016	Izzie's Way Home	Carl	Voice
2020	Impractical Jokers: The Movie	Himself	Cameo
2021	Church People	Tino	
2023	My Big Fat Greek Wedding 3	Angelo	
2023	Trolls Band Together	Ablaze	Voice

=== Television ===
Year	Title	Role	Notes
2003	My Big Fat Greek Life	Angelo	Episode: "The Empire Strikes Back"
2004	Kim Possible	Nicky-Nick (voice)	Episode: "Oh Boyz"
2005–09	Robot Chicken	Himself	3 episodes
2006	Shorty McShorts' Shorts	Ricky	3 episodes
2008	Hannah Montana	Joey Vitolo	Episode: "Bye Bye Ball"
2010–2015	Family Feud	Himself (announcer)	
2014; 2016–2017, 2024	Impractical Jokers	Himself	4 episodes
2017	Celebrity Family Feud	Himself	Episode: "Boy Band vs. Girl Group"
2017–present	Impractical Jokers: After Party	Himself (host)	
2019	The Masked Singer	Rabbit/Himself	
2019	Your Pretty Face Is Going to Hell	Himself	Episode: "OMGouija"
2019–2021	Common Knowledge	Himself (host)	
2021	Last Singer Standing	Himself (judge)	
2023	How I Met Your Father	Himself	Season 2, Episode 17: "Out of Sync"
2023	Barmageddon	Himself as a guest bartender	Episode: "Carly Pearce vs. Boyz II Men"
2025	Superkitties	Easter Bunny - Human	Season 2, Episode 19: Easter Buddy/Egg-celent Adventure

=== Music videos ===
Year	Title	Artist(s)	Director
2016	"Irresistible"	Fall Out Boy, Demi Lovato	Wayne Isham

=== Dancing with the Stars ===
Season 4:

Week #	Dance / Song	Judge's scores			Result
Week #	Dance / Song	Inaba	Goodman	Tonioli	Result
1	Cha-Cha-Cha / "You Should Be Dancing"	8	8	8	No Elimination
2	Quickstep / "Tell Her About It"	8	8	8	No Elimination
3	Tango / "Star Wars Theme/Cantina Band"	8	8	8	Safe
4	Paso doble / "Collecting the Ballots"	10	9	9	Safe
5	Rumba / "Besame Mucho"	8	8	9	Safe
6	Samba / "A Little Respect"	9	9	9	Safe
7	Foxtrot / "The Way You Make Me Feel"	10	9	10	Safe
7	Jive / "Slippin' and Slidin'"	10	10	10	Safe
8	Waltz / "Always"	9	9	8	Bottom Two
8	Mambo / "Pump It"	10	9	10	Bottom Two
9 Semi-finals	Foxtrot / "My Guy"	10	10	10	Safe
9 Semi-finals	Jive / "Jump, Jive, and Wail!"	10	10	10	Safe
10; Finals	Cha-Cha-Cha / "Groove Is in the Heart"	9	8	9	Runner-Up
10; Finals	Freestyle / "Last Dance"	10	10	10	Runner-Up
10; Finals	Tango / "Star Wars Theme/Cantina Band"	10	10	10	Runner-Up

Season 15:

Week #	Dance / Song	Judge's scores			Result
Week #	Dance / Song	Inaba	Goodman	Tonioli	Result
1	Cha-Cha-Cha / "P.Y.T. (Pretty Young Thing)"	6.5	7	7	Safe
2	Quickstep / "Creep"	7.5	7.5	7.5	Eliminated

== Awards and nominations ==
For his awards with NSYNC see List of awards and nominations received by NSYNC.

Year	Award	Category	Work	Result
2003	Actors Awards	Outstanding Performance by the Cast of a Theatrical Motion Picture	My Big Fat Greek Weeding (shared)	Nominated
2003	Teen Choice Awards	Choice Reality/Variety TV Host	Fame	Nominated
2018	Hollywood Walk of Fame	Star	NSYNC	Won

Awards and achievements
Preceded by Mario Lopez & Karina Smirnoff	Dancing with the Stars (US) runner up Season 4 (Spring 2007 with Kym Johnson)	Succeeded by Mel B & Maksim Chmerkovskiy
