= Mootz Candies =

Historic candy maker in Pottsville, Pennsylvania

Mootz Candies is a historic candy maker in Pottsville, Pennsylvania. Their products include a coal candy known as Black Diamonds.
