= Ribbon candy =

Hard candy commonly sold during Christmas time

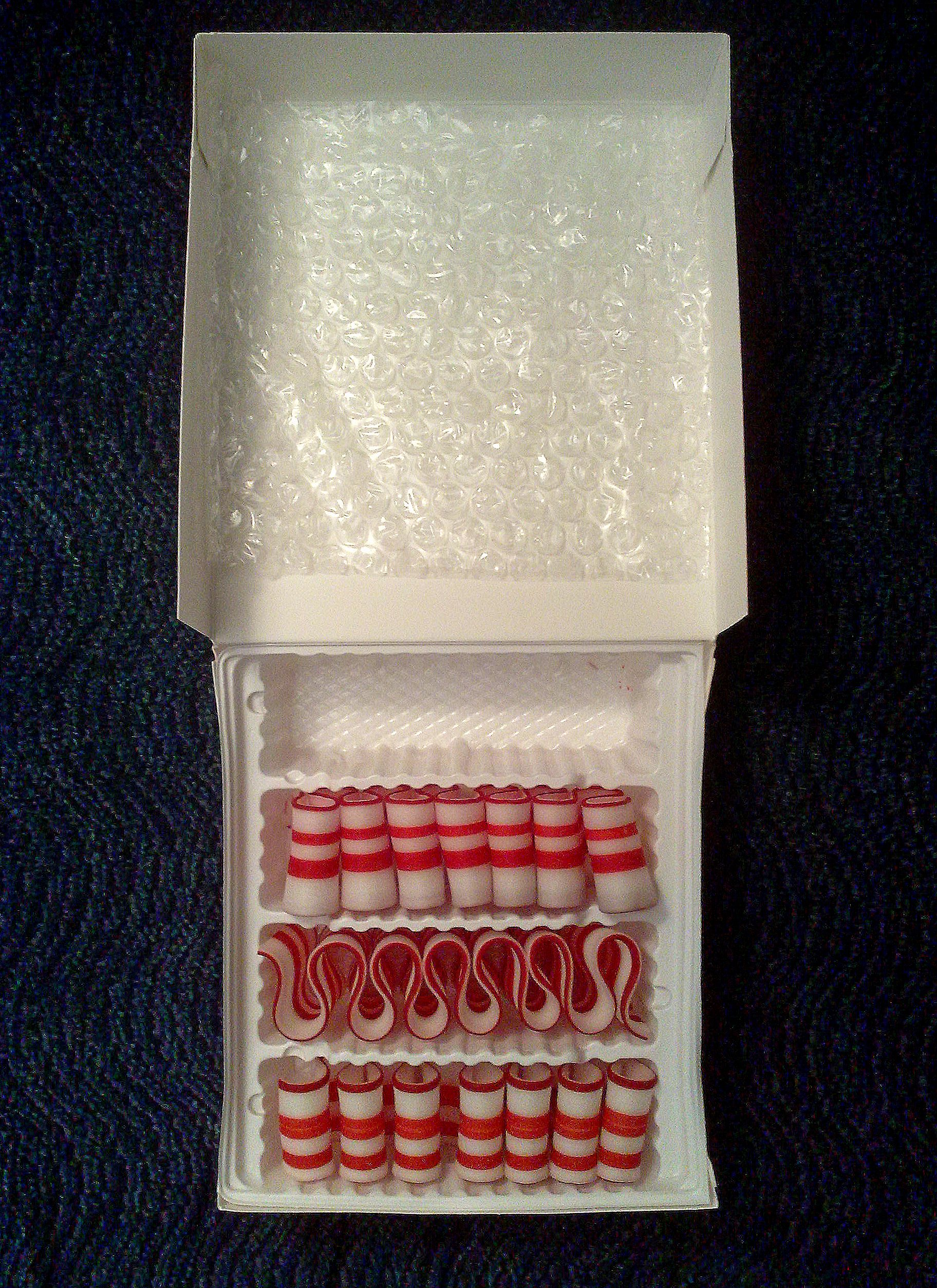
- Peppermint ribbon candy
- Type: Confectionery
- Place of origin: Unknown
- Region or state: Europe
- Main ingredients: Sugar, food coloring

Ribbon candy is a type of hard candy which in North America most often appears for sale around the Christmas holiday season. It acquires its shape by first being fashioned as warm sugar into flat strips. A strip is then folded back and forth over itself to form a hardened ribboned stick. The sugar is often colored to appear festive, and the candy often has a glossy sheen. It is commonly made with extracts, often of different mint or citrus flavors. It is usually thin enough to melt quickly in the mouth, but because pieces of it are usually larger than bite size, biting into a stick of it causes shattering and shards. Many types of ribbon candies also tend to become sticky easily, usually either due to body warmth from being held, or simply from room temperature and humidity. It is often used like decor, put out on display in candy dishes, plates, or apothecary jars. When it is used in this way it tends to end up sticking together if it has been sitting out for an extended period of time.

== History ==
Ribbon candy is a traditional Christmas candy that goes back for centuries in Europe, though it is unclear exactly where the candy was first created.

Confectioners developed the candy as a Christmas decoration for their shops, modeling the wavy form around the candy maker's thumb. In the 1800s mechanical crimpers were invented to shape the ribbons. Finger-like crimpers simulated the curl originally put into the candy by hand. A candy maker made the candy, another spun off a ribbon and fed it into a crimper which was then turned by hand. Finally, the curly ribbon was cut with scissors as it came down a small conveyor.

Mechanical crimpers worked well, but the process was slow and very labor-intensive. As demand increased for ribbon candy, it became clear that another way to make the candy had to be found. Until the 1940s ribbon candy was never made on a large scale, because more sophisticated equipment was needed. A single spinning roll was developed and it was found that by very careful tending of the candy batch, the hand spinner could be eliminated and the automated machine could run faster. The big bottleneck was in having to cut the candy with scissors. An air activated automatic cutter was invented by Sevigny Candy and is still in use today by F. B. Washburn Candy, which purchased Sevigny Candy in June 1986.
