= Coal candy =

Traditional Christmas candy

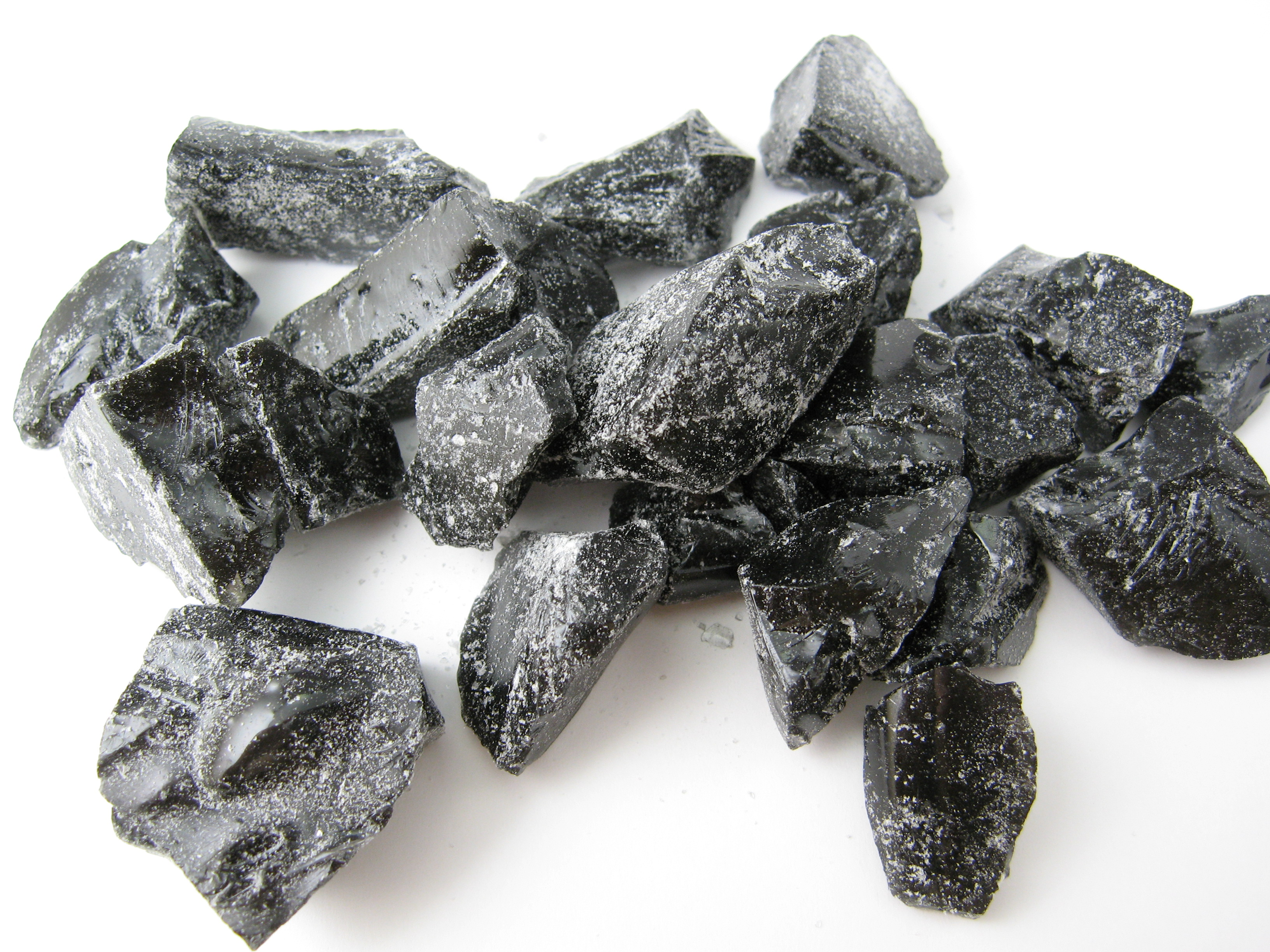
Coal candy from Akabira, Hokkaido, Japan known as "kaitaname"

Coal candy or Candy coal is a confectionery in the United States, Canada, Spain, Italy, and elsewhere associated with the Christmas holiday and the tradition of giving lumps of coal instead of presents in the Christmas stockings of naughty children. In Japan, it is known as "kaitan'ame" (塊炭飴).

Coal executives were treated to candy coal in the 19th century at lavish dinners. In the 1970s it was reported that lobbyists for the coal industry passed out coal candy to Congressmen.

Kranz's Candies sold coal candy made out of licorice in Chicago during the early 20th century.

A version of coal candy once known as "Black Diamonds" is produced in the mining town of Pottsville, Pennsylvania by Mootz Candies. The candy was invented by Catherine Mootz in the 1950s and is anise flavored. Black in color and oily, they are made in irregular chunks and packaged in miniature buckets with a small hammer.

They can be made of licorice.

== See also ==
- Rock candy
