= Designer Guys =

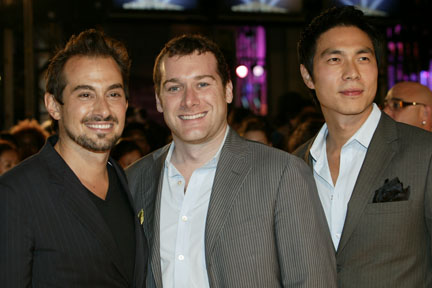
- Anwar Mekhayech, Matt Davis and Allen Chan at the 2007 Toronto International Film Festival
- Genre: Reality/design
- Created by: Mary Darling
- Presented by: Seasons 1-3: Steven Sabados; Chris Hyndman; Seasons 4-6: Allen Chan; Matt Davis; Anwar Mekhayech
- Country of origin: Canada
- Original language: English
- No. of seasons: 6

Production
- Production company: WestWind Pictures

Original release
- Network: HGTV (Canada)
- Release: January 20, 2001 – April 20, 2008

Designer Guys was a Canadian design show on HGTV, created by Mary Darling and produced by WestWind Pictures.

Debuting in 2001, the first seasons were hosted by Chris Hyndman and Steven Sabados. They hosted until 2004, when they were offered a deal with Alliance Atlantis to create a new series, Design Rivals.

After they departed, the show was relaunched in 2005 with new hosts Matt Davis, Allen Chan and Anwar Mekhayech, partners at The Design Agency. Whereas the original Hyndman/Sabados incarnation of the show concentrated primarily on interior design, the new version took on larger renovation projects. Producer Mary Darling compared the process of relaunching the show to "trying to recast The Odd Couple". The second version of the show remained in production until 2008.

In one of the most noted episodes of the second incarnation, Davis, Chan and Mekhayech travelled to Dawson City, Yukon to redesign the childhood home of Canadian literary icon Pierre Berton as a writer's retreat.

The original Hyndman-Sabados era has also been credited as one of the innovators of a shift in home design reality programming in the early 2000s, as one of the first such programs to be hosted not by a single designer depicting only the conventional parts of the renovation process, but by a pair of designers who allowed their debates and conflicts over design choices to be depicted as part of the series.
