= List of awards and nominations received by NSYNC =

*NSYNC awards and nominations
Awards and nominations
Award	Wins	Nominations
American Music Awards	3	7
Billboard Music Awards	5	9
Blockbuster Awards	5	6
Juno Awards	0	1
MTV Video Music Awards	7	15
Grammy Awards	0	9

Totals (Note: Certain award groups do not simply award one winner. They acknowledge several different recipients, have runners-up, and have third place. Since this is a specific recognition and is different from losing an award, runner-up mentions are considered wins in this award tally. For simplification and to avoid errors, each award in this list has been presumed to have had a prior nomination.)
- Wins: 36
- Nominations: 86

This is a list of awards received by American pop group *NSYNC. The group has won three American Music Awards, five Billboard Music Awards, seven MTV Video Music Awards and has received nine Grammy Award nominations. Additionally, they have received two RIAA Diamond certifications. *NSYNC received a star on the Hollywood Walk of Fame in April 2018.

== Awards and nominations ==
List of awards and nominations received by NSYNC

Organization	Year	Category	Nominee(s)	Result	Ref.
American Music Awards	1999	Favorite Pop/Rock New Artist	*NSYNC	Won	
American Music Awards	2000	Favorite Pop/Rock Band, Duo or Group	*NSYNC	Nominated	
American Music Awards	2001	'Internet Fans' Artist of the Year	*NSYNC	Won	
American Music Awards	2001	Favorite Pop/Rock Album	No Strings Attached	Nominated	
American Music Awards	2001	Favorite Pop/Rock Band, Duo or Group	*NSYNC	Nominated	
American Music Awards	2002	Favorite Pop/Rock Band, Duo or Group	*NSYNC	Won	
American Music Awards	2002	Favorite Pop/Rock Album	Celebrity	Nominated	
Billboard Music Awards	1999	Top Billboard 200 Album	*NSYNC	Nominated	
Billboard Music Awards	2000	Album of the Year	No Strings Attached	Won	
Billboard Music Awards	2000	Special Award for biggest one-week sales ever for an album	No Strings Attached	Won	
Billboard Music Awards	2000	*NSYNC	Artist of the Year	Nominated	
Billboard Music Awards	2000	*NSYNC	Top 40 Artist of the Year	Won	
Billboard Music Awards	2000	*NSYNC	Albums Artist Duo/Group of the Year	Won	
Billboard Music Awards	2001	*NSYNC	Albums Artist of the Year	Nominated	
Billboard Music Awards	2001	*NSYNC	Albums Artist Duo/Group of the Year	Nominated	
Billboard Music Awards	2001	Special Award for biggest one-week sales ever for an album	Celebrity	Won	
Blockbuster Entertainment Awards	1999	Favorite New Artist	*NSYNC	Won	
Blockbuster Entertainment Awards	2000	Favorite Song from a Movie	"Music of my Heart"	Won	
Blockbuster Entertainment Awards	2001	Favorite CD	No Strings Attached	Won	
Blockbuster Entertainment Awards	2001	Favorite Single	"Bye, Bye, Bye"	Won	
Blockbuster Entertainment Awards	2001	Favorite Group of the Year	*NSYNC	Nominated	
Blockbuster Entertainment Awards	2001	Favorite Pop Group	*NSYNC	Won	
Grammy Awards	2000	Best Pop Collaboration with Vocals	"Music of My Heart"	Nominated	
Grammy Awards	2000	Best Country Collaboration with Vocals	"God Must Have Spent a Little More Time on You"	Nominated	
Grammy Awards	2001	Record of the Year	"Bye Bye Bye"	Nominated	
Grammy Awards	2001	Best Pop Performance by a Duo or Group with Vocals	"Bye Bye Bye"	Nominated	
Grammy Awards	2001	Best Pop Vocal Album	No Strings Attached	Nominated	
Grammy Awards	2002	Best Pop Performance by a Duo or Group with Vocals	"Gone"	Nominated	
Grammy Awards	2002	Best Pop Vocal Album	Celebrity	Nominated	
Grammy Awards	2003	Best Pop Performance by a Duo or Group with Vocals	"Girlfriend"	Nominated	
Grammy Awards	2025	Best Song Written for Visual Media	"Better Place"	Nominated	
Guinness World Records	2000	Fastest-selling pop album in US History	No Strings Attached	Eliminated	
Hollywood Walk of Fame	2018	Recording Artist (Hollywood Walk of Fame)	*NSYNC	Won	
Juno Awards	2001	Best Selling Album (Foreign or Domestic)	No Strings Attached	Nominated	
MAMA Awards	2001	Best International Artist	"Pop"	Won	
MTV Europe Music Awards	2000	Best Pop	*NSYNC	Nominated	
MTV Europe Music Awards	2001	Best Pop	*NSYNC	Nominated	
MTV Video Music Awards	1999	Best Group Video	"Tearin' Up My Heart"	Nominated	
MTV Video Music Awards	1999	Best Pop Video	"Tearin' Up My Heart"	Nominated	
MTV Video Music Awards	1999	Viewer's Choice	"Tearin' Up My Heart"	Nominated	
MTV Video Music Awards	2000	Video of the Year	"Bye Bye Bye"	Nominated	
MTV Video Music Awards	2000	Best Group	"Bye Bye Bye"	Nominated	
MTV Video Music Awards	2000	Best Dance Video	"Bye Bye Bye"	Nominated	
MTV Video Music Awards	2000	Best Choreography in a Video	"Bye Bye Bye"	Won	
MTV Video Music Awards	2000	Viewer's Choice	"Bye Bye Bye"	Won	
MTV Video Music Awards	2000	Best Pop Video	"Bye Bye Bye"	Won	
MTV Video Music Awards	2001	Best Group Video	"Pop"	Won	
MTV Video Music Awards	2001	Best Dance Video	"Pop"	Won	
MTV Video Music Awards	2001	Best Pop Video	"Pop"	Won	
MTV Video Music Awards	2001	Viewer's Choice	"Pop"	Won	
MTV Video Music Awards	2001	Breakthrough Video	"Pop"	Nominated	
MTV Video Music Awards	2001	Best Editing in a Video	"Pop"	Nominated	
MTV Video Music Awards	2002	Video of the Year	"Gone"	Nominated	
MTV Video Music Awards	2002	Best Group Video	"Girlfriend"	Nominated	
MTV Video Music Awards	2002	Best Pop Video	"Girlfriend"	Nominated	
MTV Video Music Awards	2024	Best Group	*NSYNC	Nominated	
MuchMusic Video Awards	2000	Peoples Choice: Favorite International Group	"Bye Bye Bye"	Won	
Nickelodeon Kids' Choice Awards	1999	Favorite Music Group	*NSYNC	Won	
Nickelodeon Kids' Choice Awards	2000	Favorite Music Group	*NSYNC	Nominated	
Nickelodeon Kids' Choice Awards	2000	Favorite Song from a Movie	"Music of my Heart"	Nominated	
Nickelodeon Kids' Choice Awards	2001	Favorite Song	"Bye Bye Bye"	Nominated	
Nickelodeon Kids' Choice Awards	2002	Favorite Music Group	*NSYNC	Nominated	
Nickelodeon Kids' Choice Awards	2002	Favorite Song	"Pop"	Nominated	
Nickelodeon Kids' Choice Awards	2003	Favorite Music Group	*NSYNC	Nominated	
Nickelodeon Kids' Choice Awards	2003	Favorite Song	"Girlfriend (The Neptunes Remix)"	Nominated	
Nickelodeon Kids' Choice Awards	2024	Favorite Music Group	*NSYNC	Nominated	
People's Choice Awards	2001	Favorite Musical Group or Band	*NSYNC	Won	
People's Choice Awards	2002	Favorite Musical Group or Band	*NSYNC	Won	
Teen Choice Awards	1999	Choice Music Album	*NSYNC	Won	
Teen Choice Awards	1999	Choice Music Group	*NSYNC	Nominated	
Teen Choice Awards	1999	Choice Love Song	"Tearin' Up My Heart"	Nominated	
Teen Choice Awards	1999	Choice Breakout Artist	*NSYNC	Nominated	
Teen Choice Awards	2000	"It's Gonna Be Me"	Choice Music: Summer Song	Won	
Teen Choice Awards	2000	"It's Gonna Be Me"	Choice Music: Video	Won	
Teen Choice Awards	2000	Choice Music: Single	"Bye Bye Bye"	Won	
Teen Choice Awards	2000	Choice Music: Pop Group	*NSYNC	Won	
Teen Choice Awards	2000	Choice Music: Album	No Strings Attached	Nominated	
Teen Choice Awards	2001	Choice Music: Single	"Pop"	Won	
Teen Choice Awards	2001	Choice Music: Album	Celebrity	Won	
Teen Choice Awards	2001	Choice Music: Pop Group	*NSYNC	Nominated	
Teen Choice Awards	2001	Choice Music: Love Song	"This I Promise You"	Nominated	
Teen Choice Awards	2001	Choice Concert	*NSYNC	Won	
Teen Choice Awards	2002	Choice Music: Single	"Girlfriend"	Won	
Teen Choice Awards	2002	Choice Music: Hook Up	"Girlfriend"	Won	
Teen Choice Awards	2002	Choice Music: R&B/Hip-Hop Track	"Girlfriend"	Nominated	
Teen Choice Awards	2002	Choice Music: Love Song	"Gone"	Nominated	

== Listicles ==
Name of publisher, name of listicle, year(s) listed, and placement result

Billboard Magazine Year-End listicles: (Billboard Year-Endcharts are cumulative rankings of entries in Billboard magazine charts in the United States in any given chart year.
Ref	Listicle	Year	For	Position
	Top Billboard 200 Albums	1998	‘NSYNC	22nd
	Top Billboard 200 Albums	1999	‘NSYNC	4th
	Top Billboard 200 Albums	1999	Home For Christmas	58th
	Top Billboard 200 Albums	2000	No Strings Attached	1st
	Top Billboard 200 Albums	2000	*NSYNC	93rd
	Top Billboard 200 Albums	2001	Celebrity	9th
	Top Billboard 200 Albums	2001	No Strings Attached	30th
	Top Billboard 200 Albums	2002	Celebrity	54th
	Top Billboard Hot 100 Singles	1998	"I Want You Back"	37th
	Top Billboard Hot 100 Singles	1999	"(God Must Have Spent) A Little More Time on You"	45th
	Top Billboard Hot 100 Singles	1999	"Music of My Heart"	97th
	Top Billboard Hot 100 Singles	2000	"Bye Bye Bye"	21st
	Top Billboard Hot 100 Singles	2000	"It's Gonna Be Me"	27th
	Top Billboard Hot 100 Singles	2001	"This I Promise You"	51st
	Top Billboard Hot 100 Singles	2002	"Girlfriend"	33rd
	Top Billboard Hot 100 Singles	2002	"Gone"	75th
	Top Billboard 200 Artists	2000	*NSYNC	2nd
	Top Billboard 200 Artists	2001	*NSYNC	4th
	Top Billboard 200 Artists	2002	*NSYNC	54th
	Hot 100 Artists	1999	*NSYNC	25th
	Hot 100 Artists	2000	*NSYNC	6th
	Hot 100 Artists	2001	*NSYNC	29th
	Hot 100 Artists	2002	*NSYNC	30th
	Hot 100 Singles & Tracks	2000	"Bye Bye Bye"	21st
	Hot 100 Singles & Tracks	2000	"It's Gonna Be Me"	27th
	Hot 100 Singles & Tracks	2002	"Girlfriend"	33rd
	Hot 100 Singles & Tracks	2002	"Gone"	75th
	Hot 100 Singles Sales	2000	"It's Gonna Be Me"	34th
	Hot 100 Singles Sales	2002	"Gone"	5th
	Top Pop Artists	1999	*NSYNC	11th
	Top Pop Artists	2000	*NSYNC	3rd
	Top Pop Artists	2001	*NSYNC	16th
	Top Pop Artists	2002	*NSYNC	31st
	Top Billboard 200 Album Artists	1999	*NSYNC	3rd
	Top Pop Artists — Duo/Group	2000	*NSYNC	3rd
	Top Pop Artists — Duo/Group	2001	*NSYNC	7th
	Top Pop Artists — Duo/Group	2002	*NSYNC	9th
	Top Billboard (200) Album Artists — Duo/Group	1999	*NSYNC	2nd
	Top Billboard (200) Album Artists — Duo/Group	2000	*NSYNC	1st
	Top Billboard (200) Album Artists — Duo/Group	2001	*NSYNC	3rd
	Top Billboard (100) Singles Artists — Duo/Group	1999	*NSYNC	8th
	Top Billboard (100) Singles Artists — Duo/Group	2000	*NSYNC	3rd
	Top Billboard (100) Singles Artists — Duo/Group	2002	*NSYNC	8th
	Top Internet Albums	2000	No Strings Attached	2nd
	Top Internet Albums	2001	Celebrity	19th
	Top Internet Artists	2000	*NSYNC	2nd
	Top Internet Artists	2001	*NSYNC	9th
	Hot Top 40 Artists	2000	*NSYNC	1st
	Hot Top 40 Tracks	2000	"Bye Bye Bye"	3rd
	Hot Top 40 Tracks	2000	"It's Gonna Be Me"	10th
	Top Pop Catalog Artists	2001	*NSYNC	5th
	Top Pop Catalog Albums	2001	NSYNC	29th
	Hot Adult Contemporary Artists	2001	*NSYNC	4th
	Hot Adult Contemporary Tracks	2001	"This I Promise You"	2nd
	US Adult Contemporary	1999	"(God Must Have Spent) A Little More Time on You"	4th
	US Adult Contemporary	1999	"Music of My Heart"	24th
	US Adult Contemporary	2001	"This I Promise You"	2nd
	US Mainstream Top 40	1999	"Music of My Heart"	89th
	US Mainstream Top 40	2000	"Bye Bye Bye"	3rd
	US Mainstream Top 40	2000	"It's Gonna Be Me"	5th
	US Mainstream Top 40	2000	"This I Promise You"	56th
	US Mainstream Top 40	2001	"Pop"	49th
	US Mainstream Top 40	2001	"Gone"	61st
	US Mainstream Top 40	2002	"Girlfriend"	29th
	US Mainstream Top 40	2002	"Gone"	59th
	Hot 100 Airplay	2000	"It's Gonna Be Me"	30th
	US Rhythmic	1999	"Music of My Heart"	88th
	US Rhythmic	2000	"Bye Bye Bye"	11th
	US Rhythmic	2000	"It's Gonna Be Me"	25th
	US Rhythmic	2000	"This I Promise You"	59th
	US Rhythmic	2001	"Pop"	92nd
	US Rhythmic	2002	"Girlfriend"	35th
	US Rhythmic	2002	"Gone"	80th
	US Hot R&B/Hip-Hop Singles & Tracks	2002	"Girlfriend"	8th
	US Hot R&B/Hip-Hop Singles & Tracks	2002	"Gone"	75th
	Top 25 Tours	2001	*NSYNC —PopOdyssey Tour	2nd
	Top 25 Tours	2002	*NSYNC —Celebrity Tour	11th
	Top 25 Boxscores	2001	*NSYNC	6th
	Top 25 Boxscores	2001	*NSYNC	18th
	Top 25 Boxscores	2001	*NSYNC	19th
	Top 25 Boxscores	2001	*NSYNC	25th
	Decade-end (2000-2009)		No Strings Attached	1st
	Decade-end (2000-2009)		‘NSYNC	17th
	Decade-end (2000-2009)		Celebrity	42nd
