= Shahir Massoud =

Canadian chef and television personality

Shahir Massoud is a Canadian chef and television personality, best known as a cohost of the CBC Television daytime talk show The Goods.

A graduate of York University and the French Culinary Institute, he is a former executive chef of the Levetto restaurant chain. Prior to being selected as a host of The Goods, he appeared as a cooking specialist on shows such as CityLine and Breakfast Television.
