= Jessi Cruickshank =

Canadian television personality

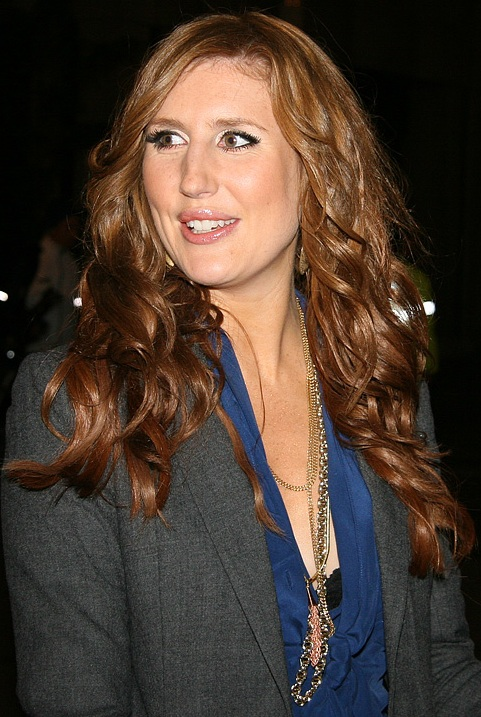
- Jessi Cruickshank
- Born: Jessica Shaia Cruickshank; July 17, 1982 (age 43); Calgary, Alberta
- Occupations: Comedian; podcast host; television personality
- Years active: 1995–present
- Spouse: Evan Gatica (m. 2014)
- Children: 3

Jessica Shaia "Jessi" Cruickshank (born July 17, 1982) is a Canadian comedian, podcast host and television personality. She is the former host of MTV Canada's program The After Show and its various incarnations including The Hills: The After Show and The City: Live After Show with co-host Dan Levy. She also hosted Canada's Smartest Person and The Goods on CBC.

== Early life ==
Cruickshank was born in Calgary, Alberta, but grew up in Vancouver, British Columbia. Her mother is Joyce Resin who once hosted a CBC show called Alive: The Picture of Health. She has an older sister named Amanda Grace, who works as a reporter and anchor for KING-TV in Seattle. Cruickshank was part of her high school's all-male improv comedy group alongside comedians Seth Rogen and Nathan Fielder right before becoming a television personality, putting her comedic skills in use while reporting or interviewing celebrities. She graduated from the University of Toronto with a degree in English and drama in 2004.

== Career ==
Cruickshank's first acting role was in a commercial for Shoppers Drug Mart. In her early teen years, she had a small role in the made-for-television movie called For Hope which was directed by Bob Saget in 1996. Before joining MTV, Cruickshank was a co-host on YTV for a show called Weird On Wheels.

=== MTV ===
Cruickshank was one of the original seven co-hosts of MTV's flagship series MTV Live, which was then hosted by fellow MTV hosts Daryn Jones, Nicole Holness and Paul Lemieux until its cancellation in 2012. Cruickshank has interviewed an array of high-profile celebrities including the casts of The Hills, The City and Twilight, along with Adam Lambert, Bill Gates, Zac Efron, Tom Cruise, Will Ferrell, Rihanna, Drake, Sharon and Bram of Sharon, Lois & Bram, and Bradley Cooper.

=== Hosting and producing ===
Upon moving to Los Angeles, she filmed a show called Real Hollywood Survival Guide, which aired on MTV. Cruickshank was also a producer at The Oprah Winfrey Network. Cruickshank was the Los Angeles correspondent for the Canadian entertainment show etalk, during which she joined the etalk TIFF coverage team for several years. Cruickshank went on to host various events and shows including co-hosting The CW show Oh Sit!, which aired on MuchMusic in Canada, the CBC shows Canada's Smartest Person and The Goods, and hosting the reunion special of the reality TV show Jerseylicious.

=== Comedy ===
Cruickshank created the digital series New Mom, Who Dis? about her journey as a new mother in 2018. In 2022, she toured Canadian cities with her first live comedy show, Up Close and Too Personal, and in spring 2025, she toured her second comedy show, Now That's What I Call Live!, across Canada. In March 2026, she announced that she would be DJing dance parties in cities across Canada in the spring, under the event name Evening Club. She is currently hosting her weekly podcast show Phone A Friend, which debuted as the #1 comedy show across all podcasts.

== Philanthropy ==
Cruickshank was actively involved with the organization Free The Children as an ambassador, for which she filmed multiple MTV specials. She spoke at and hosted multiple We Days and Free The Children events. Cruickshank has also attended various speaking events and travelled internationally for organizations including Plan Canada and Global Citizen.

== Personal life ==
Cruickshank married her long-term boyfriend Evan Gatica in 2014, with her former co-host Dan Levy in attendance. The couple has three children: twin boys and a girl.

== Filmography ==
Cruickshank played Kristin in The Rest of My Life, a TV movie concluding the ninth season of Degrassi: The Next Generation that aired in Canada on MuchMusic on July 16, 2010, and in the United States on TeenNick. She was also in the direct-to-video movie Virtuality that came out in 2010. In 2024, Cruickshank released her first stand-up comedy special entitled Minivan Money, which premiered on the global streaming platform, Veeps.

== See also ==
- Canada's Smartest Person
- The After Show
- The Goods
