= Chris Kirkpatrick =

American musician (born 1971)

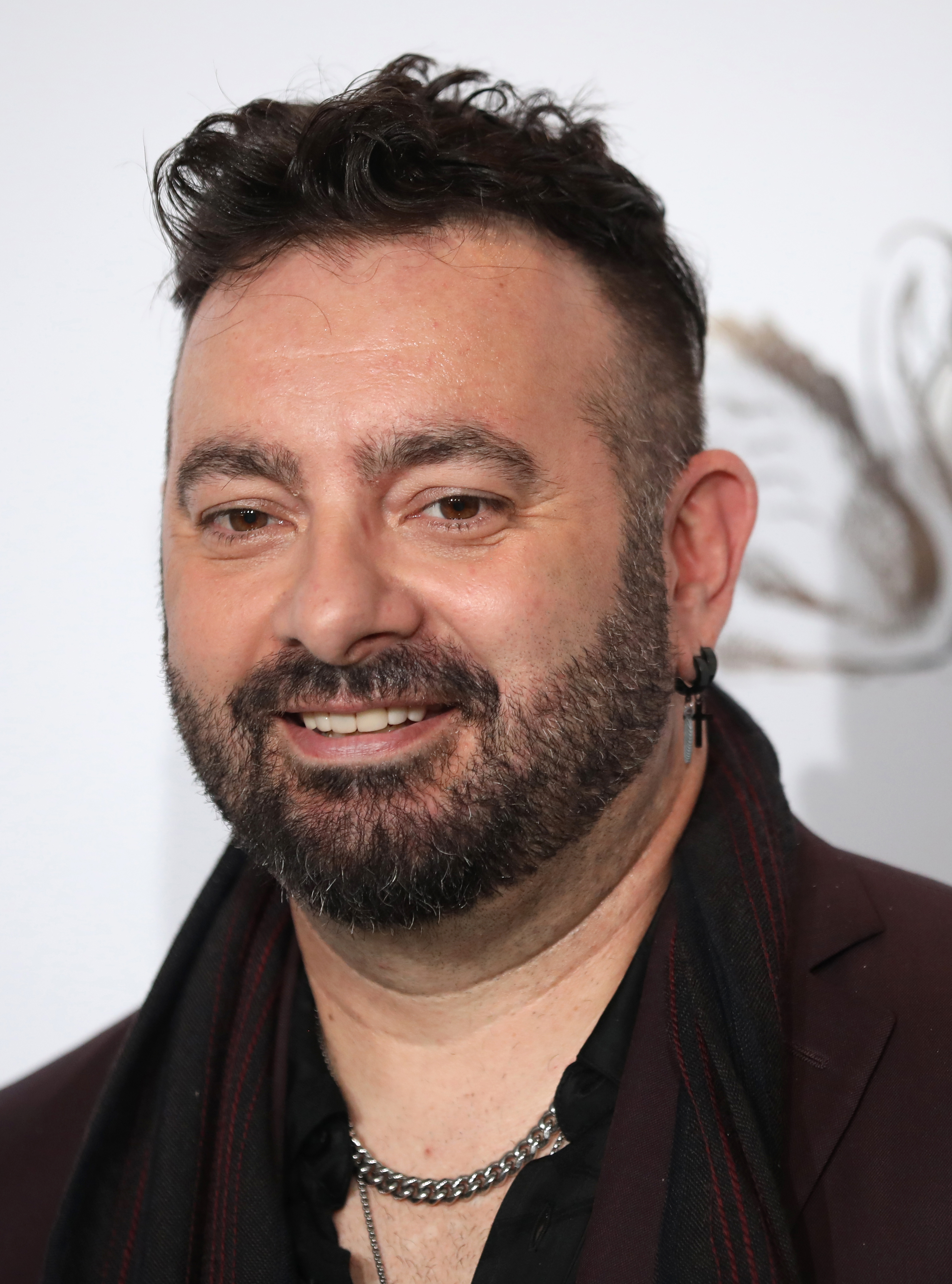
- Kirkpatrick in 2024

Background information
- Born: Christopher Alan Kirkpatrick; October 17, 1971 (age 55); Clarion, Pennsylvania, U.S.
- Origin: Orlando, Florida, U.S.
- Genres: Pop; pop rock; alternative rock
- Occupations: Singer; songwriter; producer; dancer; actor
- Years active: 1995–present
- Labels: RCA; Jive
- Formerly of: NSYNC
- Spouse: Karlyn Skladany (m. 2013)

Christopher Alan Kirkpatrick (born October 17, 1971) is an American singer, songwriter, dancer, music producer, podcaster, and actor. He founded the pop group NSYNC, in which he sang countertenor. The band has sold over 70 million records, becoming one of the best-selling boy bands of all time. Kirkpatrick was the lead singer in various songs including "Thinking of You (I Drive Myself Crazy)", "Together Again", "The Lion Sleeps Tonight", "I Thought She Knew", "Just Got Paid", and many songs from their Christmas album, Home for Christmas.

In television, he played Chip Skylark on the Nickelodeon series The Fairly OddParents. Kirkpatrick has also participated in numerous reality TV shows, including Celebrity Big Brother, The Masked Singer, and Gone Country.

== Early life and education ==
Kirkpatrick was born on October 17, 1971, in Clarion, Pennsylvania to single mother, Beverly Eustice, when she was 16 years old. She raised him on her own along with his four younger half-sisters (Molly, Kate, Emily, and Taylor). He is of Irish, Scottish, Native American, and Hispanic descent.

Kirkpatrick and his family grew up in poverty and on welfare, sometimes homeless and living out of a car, and had to move around a lot. As a result, he attended many different schools and lived in several states, including Pennsylvania, Ohio, South Carolina, and California. At one point, his family lived in a trailer during the winter with no electricity and a hole in the side of it, and his mother had to pile dirty laundry in front of it to keep the snow from coming in. Since his family could not afford to wash their clothes, he rarely had clean clothes to wear and had to sleep in the piles of dirty laundry at night to keep warm. Kirkpatrick recalls frequently going without food and not always knowing where their next meal would come from, often relying on food stamps, free school lunches, and donated items to survive. To help his mom cover the bills he began working on a farm while still in grade school. Due to his family's financial problems and his ADHD (Attention Deficit Hyperactivity Disorder), Kirkpatrick struggled in school.

Despite their financial struggles, Kirkpatrick's family had a musical background: his mother was a vocal coach, his grandmother trained in opera, his grandfather was a country-western singer, and his aunts and uncles were all in bands. Kirkpatrick also showed a keen talent for music from a young age. In sixth grade, while living in Oil City, Pennsylvania, Kirkpatrick won the lead role as Oliver Twist in the city's high school musical production of Oliver!. From then on, he began to study music more seriously, enrolling in gifted classes for music and learning to play a number of different instruments. In seventh grade, he moved to Dalton, Ohio, and attended Dalton High School where he continued his involvement in music, starring as Lieutenant Joseph Cable in his school's production of South Pacific and appearing in many other musical productions throughout high school. In addition to musicals, Kirkpatrick participated in his school's choir, and made the All-Ohio State Fair Youth Choir, which opened for New Kids on the Block at the Ohio State Fair. Besides music, Kirkpatrick also participated heavily in sports, including football, basketball, baseball, and track.

After graduating from high school in 1990, he moved to Orlando, Florida, to get to know his biological father, who offered to help him pay for college. He attended Valencia College, where he originally intended to pursue an acting career in theatre. However, he changed his major to music after receiving scholarships for his involvement in Valencia's choir. While at Valencia, Kirkpatrick began forming various a cappella groups and arranging music to practice and perform at coffee shops. Later, he auditioned and became involved as a caroler for the Caroling Company, which eventually led him to a job as a doo-wop singer at Universal Studios. Kirkpatrick received his associate degree in music in 1993.

Afterwards, Chris received another scholarship to attend Rollins College where he studied music and psychology and worked performing at Universal Studios Florida as a member of a doo-wop group called The Hollywood Hi-Tones, as a photographer at Sea World, waiting tables at Outback Steakhouse, and as a local DJ.

== Career ==
Sometime in the early 90's, while working at Universal Studios and singing in The Hollywood Hi-Tones (a throwback doo-wop group of aspiring singers and actors) Chris Kirkpatrick was introduced to Lou Pearlman through Charlie Edwards, a mutual friend that he had met in choir. Edwards had briefly been a part of the Backstreet Boys before quitting, and had heard that Pearlman was interested in financing another vocal group, so he passed the information to Kirkpatrick.

Originally, when the Backstreet Boys were forming Kirkpatrick was unaware about their auditions so he never tried out. However, after hearing about what Lou Pearlman was doing with the Backstreet Boys (he was acquainted with Howie Dorough), Kirkpatrick became interested in doing more than just a cappella. When Pearlman finally met Chris Kirkpatrick and saw him perform in his doo-wop group, Lou immediately took an interest in him. They discussed the idea for Kirkpatrick to form a vocal group, which Pearlman promised to finance if Kirkpatrick could find other young singers to join him.

Kirkpatrick took the opportunity, and after over a year of searching and trying out different people he eventually recruited Justin Timberlake and JC Chasez (members of the 1990s Mickey Mouse Club revival), and the three formed the nucleus of NSYNC. Later, Chris recruited Joey Fatone who was also working at Universal Studios at the time. After some difficulty finding a consistent bass singer, the group eventually found Lance Bass through Justin's vocal coach, and the group collectively came together in September 1995.

The group moved into a house together and began practicing their singing and choreography in a warehouse in Orlando for hours to help train their vocals and stamina. Shortly after Bass joined the group, they recorded their first performance at Pleasure Island in Orlando as their demo for record companies. Afterwards, Kirkpatrick dropped out of Rollins College to pursue a music career with NSYNC in Germany.

=== NSYNC ===
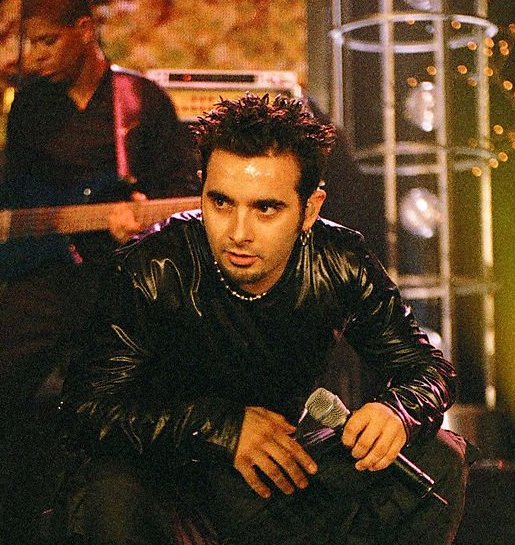
Chris Kirkpatrick circa 1999

With NSYNC, Kirkpatrick sold over seventy million records throughout the late 1990s and early 2000s. He sang countertenor/soprano and lead in various songs including "Thinking of You (I Drive Myself Crazy)", "Together Again", "The Lion Sleeps Tonight", "That's the Way Love Goes", "I Thought She Knew", "Just Got Paid", and many songs from their Christmas album.

Initially signed to Ariola Records in Germany, NSYNC's self-titled debut album was released in Europe in 1997 and internationally the following year, selling eleven million copies. Their debut album produced a number of singles including "I Want You Back", "Tearin' Up My Heart", "Thinking of You (I Drive Myself Crazy)", "(God Must Have Spent) A Little More Time on You", and "Here We Go".

On November 10, 1998, the group released a holiday album, Home for Christmas. The album peaked at number 7 and sold 2 million copies, with their most popular song being "Merry Christmas, Happy Holidays". With this, NSYNC achieved the rare feat of having two albums in the Billboard Top 10 at the same time. Later the next year, the band had a series of highly publicized financial and legal struggles with Lou Pearlman. They were eventually released from their contracts with Pearlman in 1999 and signed with Jive Records.

NSYNC's sophomore album, No Strings Attached, was released the following year and sold a record-breaking 2.4 million copies in its first week and by the end of the year had sold over 9.9 million copies making it the best-selling album of the year. The album produced 3 hit singles including "Bye Bye Bye", "It's Gonna Be Me", and "This I Promise You". Not only was No Strings Attached the best-selling album of 2000, but it was also the second-best selling album of the decade behind The Beatles' 1.

NSYNC's third album, Celebrity, was released in July 2001 and produced three hit singles: "Pop", "Gone", and "Girlfriend". NSYNC's Celebrity album sold 1,879,955 copies in its first week, making it the second-fastest-selling album in SoundScan history at the time, only behind the group's previous album No Strings Attached. The Celebrity album featured more creative involvement from the group, who wrote and produced many of their own tracks, of which Kirkpatrick is credited for writing the song "Falling".

After their Celebrity Tour, NSYNC announced in April 2002 that they would be taking a hiatus, and each member of the group began venturing into their own solo projects. Although NSYNC never officially broke up, they have not reunited, with mixed responses from members as to whether a reunion would ever happen. NSYNC's last official performance was at the 2003 Grammys during their Bee Gees medley tribute, however, the band briefly came together to perform at the 2013 MTV Video Music Awards during Timberlake's Video Vanguard Award performance.

In 2018, all five members reunited when they received a star on the Hollywood Walk of Fame. In April 2019, NSYNC reunited without Timberlake for a one-off performance with Ariana Grande for her headlining set at the Coachella Valley Music and Arts Festival.

In September 2023, a new NSYNC song, "Better Place" was announced following a reunion of the band at the MTV Video Music Awards. The song, part of the soundtrack to the movie Trolls Band Together was released September 29, 2023. In addition to their song, all five members also made cameos as trolls for the movie, which was premiered in the U.S. on November 17, 2023. As part of their reunion, they also recorded an episode of the show Hot Ones (released September 21, 2023) and reminisced while discussing their legacy.

=== Solo music ===
After NSYNC disbanded, Kirkpatrick started working on several musical projects, including writing and singing lead for his alternative rock band Nigel's 11 (also written as Nigels 11 or Nigels11). Nigel's 11 was an American alternative rock band officially formed in Florida in 2007 by Chris Kirkpatrick, and consisted of Chris Kirkpatrick (lead vocalist), Mike Bosch (guitar), Dave Carreiro (bass), and Ernie Longoria (drums). The band was originally called The Little Red Monsters when Kirkpatrick debuted their first songs at the April Fool's Ball in 2004 before the group's name and lineup changed.

Nigel's 11 began working on their album in 2009 and released their first album, Clandestine Operation, independently in 2010. The album featured five original songs: "Who Am I?", "All The Way Around", "Mr. Jealousy", "Get Out", and "Crazy Girl". The songs from Clandestine Operation focused heavily on themes of overcoming personal struggles and issues of self-identity. Kirkpatrick stated that his band's sound was influenced by various 1970s and 1980s rock groups that he admired such as Electric Light Orchestra, Queen, and Boston.

Nigel's 11 also made a number of other songs that were not included on their debut album, but were released either online or at live shows, including "All She Wrote", "Say You Will", "Tokyo", "Jodi's Song", "Everybody Gets Lost", and "My World". Some of their music was also included in the soundtrack for A Christmas Snow, and included an original song, called "All Alone", as well as a punk rock remix of a traditional Christmas song, "O Come, All Ye Faithful".

Nigel's 11 eventually stopped performing together due to geographical distance and Kirkpatrick's busy schedule of managing and producing music for other artists at the time.

=== Television and film ===
In addition to his solo music, Kirkpatrick also became involved in voice acting, providing his voice for the famous popstar character Chip Skylark (a caricature of Kirkpatrick himself) on the animated television series The Fairly OddParents on Nickelodeon. Having appeared in numerous episodes spanning from 2002 to 2009, his character did many songs such as "My Shiny Teeth and Me", "Find Your Voice", and "Icky Vicky", and developed a significant fan following.

In 2007, Kirkpatrick agreed to host and star in the MTV reality show Mission Man Band alongside the late Rich Cronin of LFO as a favor to him as Cronin battled his leukemia. Also on the show was Bryan Abrams of Color Me Badd and Jeff Timmons of 98°. The show was about former boyband members of the 1990s forming a new group together and debuted on August 7, 2007. Kirkpatrick hosted the show at his Orlando house, and the guys formed the supergroup "man band" called Sureshot in which they recorded three original songs, including "Story Of My Life", "Withoutcha", and "Work That Out" and performed at local sporting events, charities, and fairs. The show's last episode aired on January 1, 2008.

In April 2008, it was announced that Kirkpatrick would be a part of the second season of CMT's show Gone Country. Kirkpatrick participated in Gone Country with other cast members: Sebastian Bach, Irene Cara (one episode), Mikalah Gordon, Jermaine Jackson, Lorenzo Lamas, and Sean Young. The show was hosted by John Rich of the country duo Big & Rich. During the show, for which each contestant had to prepare and perform an original song, John Rich told Kirkpatrick that he had one of the strongest songs of the competition with "That'll Get Ya By", which he dedicated to his mother, who he said: "held the family together". On the show, John Rich said that Kirkpatrick impressed many country fans when he stepped on stage and proved he had the writing skills and voice to be a successful country artist. The first place prize of having a record produced by John Rich and the promise of play from Kix Brooks on his radio show went to Sebastian Bach. However, John Rich congratulated Kirkpatrick on his success and told him he had the writing skills and voice to be a successful country artist and that he could see his song going number one as a country hit. The second-season last show episode aired on September 26, 2008.

In 2021, Chris Kirkpatrick participated in ABC's A Very Boy Band Holiday with Joey Fatone, Wanya Morris, and other figures from prominent vocal groups. During the special, which aired on December 6, 2021, he sang "Rockin' Around the Christmas Tree" and provided his vocals to numerous other holiday classics.

In 2022, Chris Kirkpatrick participated as a houseguest on the third season of Celebrity Big Brother, which began on February 2, 2022, and was able to win an HoH competition before leaving the show. Kirkpatrick later competed in season eight of The Masked Singer as "Hummingbird". He placed second in his group, but ultimately lost to season eight's winner Amber Riley as "Harp", becoming the third contestant to be unmasked after William Shatner as "Knight" and Eric Idle as "Hedgehog". In 2022, Chris Kirkpatrick was also featured on an episode of MTV Cribs.

Besides television, Kirkpatrick has also done some minor acting in films such as Trolls Band Together where he voiced Trickee, Sharknado 3: Oh Hell No! where he played a lifeguard, and Dead 7, a 2016 western zombie film written by Nick Carter, where he played the role of Mayor Shelby.

=== Other ventures ===
In 1999, Kirkpatrick founded a clothing line called FuMan Skeeto, which was a cross between the urban and skater fashion trends of the time. His unisex line of clothing included casual items like T-shirts, shorts, cut-off shirts, long-sleeved jerseys, and hats. Fuman Skeeto also produced specialty clothing items for notable celebrities like Britney Spears as well as members of his own band. The clothing line ceased as of 2002.

In 2002 / 2003, Kirkpatrick was offered the role of Jesus in Broadway's rock opera Jesus Christ Superstar. However, he turned down the role to spend some time away from the spotlight.

In 2004, Kirkpatrick founded his own non-profit organization, the Chris Kirkpatrick Foundation, which seeks to enhance the lives of underprivileged children in central Florida by providing health care as well as educational, developmental and monitoring programs, citing his own difficult childhood as his major inspiration for starting the foundation. In addition to these programs, his foundation also hosts annual events for children.

Since NSYNC, Kirkpatrick has also appeared in various music videos for other artists including "Lifestyles of the Rich and Famous" by Good Charlotte, "2nd Sucks" by A Day to Remember, "Irresistible" by Fall Out Boy featuring Demi Lovato, and "Merry Christmas, Happy Holidays" (2019 Version) by David Archuleta.

Currently, Kirkpatrick continues to write and produce music, work with charities, manage other artists, host and perform events across the country (including the Pop2000 Tour with O-Town, Smash Mouth, Ryan Cabrera, LFO, and Mark McGrath), co-host his podcast Name Drop with Brian McFayden, and has collaborated on songs with various artists, including David Foster ("I Will"), Blake Lewis ("She's Makin Me Lose It"), AJ McLean's project ATCK ("Air"), and Tony Lucca ("Wiggle It Out").

== Personal life ==
=== Relationships ===
Kirkpatrick kept his relationship status relatively private until 2010, when he started dating Karlyn M. Skladany. In October 2012, Kirkpatrick proposed to her in Capri, Italy. They married on November 2, 2013, at the Loews Resort Hotel in Orlando, Florida, with all his former NSYNC bandmates in attendance as ushers. In March 2017, the couple announced that they were expecting a child. His wife gave birth to his son on October 10, 2017.

In 2018, Kirkpatrick sold his half-acre estate (dubbed Casa Della Musica) in Orlando, Florida, after having moved to Nashville, Tennessee, in 2016, where he currently resides with his wife and son.

=== Controversies ===
After Eminem's arrest in 2000, Chris Kirkpatrick was quoted as saying:

His arrest is karma. It's really sad when people have to put everybody else down to make themselves look good. The guy's digging himself a grave, and soon he's not gonna have any friends.

As a result, in 2002 Kirkpatrick was name dropped in Eminem's hit song "Without Me". The rapper told MTV's Total Request Live that the reason he name dropped him was because Kirkpatrick was the only boyband member who had the guts to say something back to him, after the rapper attacked the group and boybands in general on his last album.

== Discography ==
=== NSYNC ===
- NSYNC (1997)
- Home for Christmas (1998)
- No Strings Attached (2000)
- Celebrity (2001)

=== Nigel's 11 ===
- Clandestine Operation (2010)

== Filmography ==
Film
Year	Title	Role	Notes
1999	NSYNC: N'The Mix	Himself	
2000	NSYNC: Live from Madison Square Garden	Himself	
2000	NSYNC: Making the Tour	Himself	
2001	NSYNC: Bigger Than Live	Himself	
2001	NSYNC: Popodyssey Live	Himself	
2001	On the Line	Angelo (the hairstylist)	
2001	Longshot	Pizza Patron	
2002	The Reel NSYNC	Himself	
2015	Sharknado 3: Oh Hell No!	Pool Lifeguard	
2016	Dead 7	Mayor Shelby	
2019	The Boy Band Con: The Lou Pearlman Story	Himself	
2023	Trolls Band Together	Trickee (voice)	
2024	Dirty Pop: The Boy Band Scam	Himself	

Television
Year	Title	Role	Notes
1998	Sabrina the Teenage Witch	Himself	
1999	Clueless	Himself	
1999	Touched By An Angel	Street Performer	
2000	Hollywood Squares	Himself (panelist)	
2000	Sesame Street	Himself	
2000	Saturday Night Live	No Refund	
2001	The Simpsons	Himself	
2001	MadTV	Himself ("This 'N' That with Rusty")	
2002	Music Mania	Himself / Co-host	Co-host with JC Chasez and Jennifer Love Hewitt
2002–2009	The Fairly OddParents	Chip Skylark, Skip Sparkypants (voices)	3 episodes
2004	Stripperella	Josh Justin Jason	
2007	Mission Man Band	Himself	
2007	Tyra Banks Show	Himself	Season 3, Episode 10
2008	Gone Country	Himself (contestant)	
2016	Angie Tribeca	Chad	
2017	Return of the Mac	Himself	
2017	Celebrity Family Feud	Himself (contestant)	
2018	King of the Golden Sun	Cruise Ship Singer	
2018	The Ellen DeGeneres Show	Himself	
2019	Lights Out with David Spade	Himself	
2021	A Very Boy Band Holiday	Himself	
2022	Celebrity Big Brother	Himself	
2022	The Masked Singer	Hummingbird / Himself	Season 8 contestant
2022	MTV Cribs	Himself	
2023	Hot Ones	Himself	
2024	I Can See Your Voice	Himself	
2026	Bar Rescue	Himself	Episode: "Don't Leave it to Happenchance"

== Tours ==
Headlining

- For the Girl Tour (1997)
- NSYNC in Concert (1998–2000)
- No Strings Attached Tour (2000)
- PopOdyssey Tour (2001)
- Celebrity Tour (2002)
- Pop2000 Tour (2021–current)

As supporting act

- The Velvet Rope Tour (supporting Janet Jackson) (1998)
