= Broken Promises =

Broken Promise(s) may refer to:

== Music ==
- Broken Promises (EP), a 2000 EP by Allen Crane
- "Broken Promises", a song from the album Element Eighty (2003) by Element Eighty
- "Broken Promises", a 2025 song by Luke Marzec
- "Broken Promises", a song by Moments in Grace on These Days Will Fade (2003)
- "Broken Promises", a song by Summer Walker from Still Over It (2021)
- "Broken Promises", a song by Survivor on Vital Signs (1984)
- "Broken Promises", a song by the Tom Tom Club from the album Boom Boom Chi Boom Boom (1988)
- "Broken Promises", a 2001 single by Tonya Mitchell

== Other uses ==
- "Broken Promises" (Agents of S.H.I.E.L.D.), a 2017 episode of Agents of S.H.I.E.L.D.
- Broken Promises: Caste, Crime and Politics in Bihar, a 2024 book by Mrityunjay Sharma
- Broken Promises: Taking Emily Back, a 1993 American drama television film
- Broken Promise (2009 film), a war drama film
- Broken Promise (1981 film), an American made-for-television drama film

== See also ==
- Election promise
