= Celebrity Tour =

2002 concert tour by NSYNC

- Tour by NSYNC
- Associated album: Celebrity
- Start date: March 3, 2002
- End date: April 28, 2002
- Legs: 1
- No. of shows: 36
- Box office: $33.3 million ($59.61 million in 2025 dollars)

NSYNC concert chronology
- PopOdyssey (2001); Celebrity Tour (2002)

The Celebrity Tour was the fifth and final concert tour by the American boy band NSYNC before their indefinite hiatus in May 2002. Promoting their fourth studio album, Celebrity (2001), this is the second tour to showcase the album. The group stated that the tour would go "back to their roots," as they would be performing obscure songs from all three of their albums. The tour earned nearly $30 million. The tour was in the months right before the group went on a scheduled hiatus in May 2002.

== Background ==
In January 2002, NSYNC announced another string of tour dates known as the "Celebrity Tour." They believed that their songs were well known by then and were able to experiment a little more. Originally, the group wanted to perform in theaters, however, they were pushed to arenas due to demand. During an interview, band member Chris Kirkpatrick stated the second outing would remove the spectacle of their previous tour PopOdyssey and focus on just music. The tour would offer a more intimate vibe with "a circular stage that gives...a 360-degree view" for fans and would incorporate reworked versions of older songs. Justin Timberlake said,

"[Fans] knew when they were coming to the show last summer that they were going to get something that nobody else had, which was basically about 80 percent of the album that was going to come out after the tour. This year, obviously, they'll know the songs, but we put a twist almost on everything, so it makes it fun for them to hear it a different way and to try to recognize those tunes."

The opening acts for the Celebrity Tour included R&B singer Ginuwine, rapper and entrepreneur P. Diddy, and alternative rock band Smash Mouth. The new tour dates coincided with the band's partnership with Chili's, which they were featured in several advertisements online and on television. Before the tour began, NSYNC released the third single from their album "Girlfriend", and performed at the 2002 Winter Olympics at the Olympic Medals Plaza on February 23, 2002.

== Synopsis ==
The show opens with a short black-and-white clip of the guys talking about how fame and celebrity have not changed them, with Kirkpatrick saying, "We're just five guys doing what we've always done." The guys rise to the stage through fog and open with “Do Your Thing," later shifting to “Bye Bye Bye” and "It's Gonna Be Me" which ends with “a waterfall of sparks."

After singing “(God Must Have Spent) A Little More Time on You”, “Tearin’ Up My Heart” and “Celebrity” the guys slide down black poles out of sight. Towards the middle section, a large oval platform descends from the ceiling, allowing the guys to stroll from the stage to the center of the arena. On this elevated platform, the guys, now dressed in black tuxedos, sing a medley of covers from The Beatles and The Temptations. They end the set with a remixed two-step version of “Sailing” which was well-received.

For "No Strings Attached," the guys swing on ropes over the crowds. Towards the end, the guys sit on stools on the stage to sing their more downtempo songs, including a singalong version of "Thinking Of You (I Drive Myself Crazy)" and a New Orleans inspired-blues version of "I Want You Back." While sitting on the stage, the guys engage in witty banter with the audience and joke around. The band ends the show with a high-energy encore of their latest hits.

== Critical response ==
The tour was reviewed positively by critics, who praised the tour's stripped-down feel and showmanship. Pam Sitt of The Seattle Times lauded “the new, down-to-earth, accessible [NSYNC]". Reviewing the Rose Garden show, Marty Hughley of The Oregonian wrote, "Lead singers Justin Timberlake and JC Chasez sounded more assured than ever, the whole group's harmonies were tighter and stronger, the dancing looked like second nature, and the show kept a breathless pace without ever seeming to rush". Some critics felt the tour showed NSYNC's ability to successfully cross over from the teen pop bubblegum sound to a more mature persona. Makeisha Madden of The News Tribune called the Tacoma Dome show "one big joyride through an amusement park...starting off slowly and building anticipation in the near sellout crowd during a fine-tuned, 24-song frenzy that exploded at the very end".

Much acclaim was given to NSYNC's Beatles/Temptations medley, which was called "a joyous, finger-snapping tribute...offering coolly confident versions of 'My Girl' and 'The Way You Do the Things You Do' that brought grins from the parents and grandparents in the audience". Hughley wrote the band "captured the exuberance of The Beatles as well as the silky sound and steps of the Temptations".

Leah Greenblatt of MTV News described the Rose Garden show as "electric". She dubbed it "the Justin and JC Show" and said "Justin was quickly established as the star...at least as far as the Jumbotron cameramen were concerned—with JC running a close second. Joey, Lance and Chris have all the moves down, but appear to be going through the motions at times". Greenblatt noted "Justin especially reveled in his role, and played the audience like a Stratocaster, goading them into sing-alongs and putting in some quality time alone up front at the lip of the stage". A segment in which a solo Timberlake riffs with the band guitarist received mixed reviews, with Kelefa Sanneh of The New York Times saying, "'Gone', a fluttery slow jam sung by Justin Timberlake, is the best song the group has ever recorded, but it was nearly ruined by a histrionic coda that found him dueling with the guitarist".

Sanneh continued, "The group is getting older, and its audience is, too: the young woman in the 'Justin I'm legal' t-shirt may not have been misrepresenting herself. And this tour is clearly designed to emphasize the group's musical credibility. And yet NSYNC is still a boy band, which means its existence—and its self-image—depends on its ability to entertain screaming teenagers".

== Broadcasts and recordings ==
Though the closing show at the TD Waterhouse Centre was filmed for a possible Celebrity tour DVD release, to date a DVD has not been released due to the footage being deemed "unusable." Bootleg DVDs were sold on eBay in 2003 with amateur footage of the concerts in Anaheim, Dallas, San Diego and Fort Lauderdale. A six-minute video montage of the Orlando show professionally filmed by Steve Fatone appeared on YouTube in 2006. A five minute video of NSYNC's performance to their song "Girlfriend" professionally filmed from their Grand Rapids show was found on YouTube uploaded by Salg1000.

== Personnel ==
=== NSYNC ===
- JC Chasez – lead tenor vocals
- Justin Timberlake – lead tenor vocals
- Chris Kirkpatrick – backing countertenor vocals
- Lance Bass – backing bass vocals
- Joey Fatone – backing baritone vocals

=== Band ===
- Kevin Antunes – music director, keyboards
- Troy Antunes – bass
- Billy Ashbaugh – drums, percussion
- Greg Howe – lead guitar
- Ruben Ruiz – rhythm guitar, keyboards
- David Cook – keyboards
- Paul Howards – saxophone, percussion, keyboards
- Juan Sepulveda – percussion

== Opening acts ==
- Ginuwine (select dates)
- Mr. Cheeks (select dates)
- P. Diddy (select dates)
- Smash Mouth (select dates)
- Tony Lucca (select dates)

== Set list ==
The following set list was obtained from the concert held on March 3, 2002, at the Rose Garden in Portland, Oregon. It does not represent all concerts for the duration of the tour.

1. "Do Your Thing"
2. "Bye Bye Bye"
3. "It's Gonna Be Me" (contains elements of "It Ain't My Fault")
4. "For the Girl Who Has Everything"
5. "(God Must Have Spent) A Little More Time on You"
6. "Tearin' Up My Heart" (contains elements of "If")
7. "Celebrity"
8. "Up Against the Wall"
9. Medley:
  1. "She Loves You"
  2. "I Wanna Hold Your Hand"
  3. "Hey Jude"
10. "Twist and Shout"
11. Medley:
  1. "My Girl"
  2. "The Way You Do the Things You Do"
  3. "I Can't Get Next to You"
12. "Sailing" (contains elements of "Don't Tell Me")
13. "Tell Me, Tell Me...Baby" (contains elements of "A Little Bit" and "Baby, Come Over (This Is Our Night)")
14. "No Strings Attached"
15. "This I Promise You"
16. "Thinking of You (I Drive Myself Crazy)"
17. "I Want You Back" (Blues Version)"

Encore

18. "Gone"
19. "Girlfriend" (The Neptunes Remix)"
20. "Pop" (contains elements of "Control")

== Shows ==
List of concerts, showing date, city, country, venue, opening act, tickets sold, number of available tickets and amount of gross revenue
Date	City	Country	Venue	Opening act	Attendance	Revenue
March 3, 2002	Portland	United States	Rose Garden	Ginuwine	12,913 / 17,840	$825,843
March 4, 2002	Tacoma	United States	Tacoma Dome	Ginuwine	19,542 / 20,604	$1,126,473
March 6, 2002	Oakland	United States	The Arena in Oakland	Ginuwine	13,219 / 16,579	$682,146
March 7, 2002	Sacramento	United States	ARCO Arena	Ginuwine	14,661 / 15,272	$883,101
March 8, 2002	San Jose	United States	Compaq Center	Ginuwine	14,857 / 16,615	$896,542
March 10, 2002	San Diego	United States	San Diego Sports Arena	Ginuwine	12,312 / 14,391	$838,556
March 11, 2002	Anaheim	United States	Arrowhead Pond of Anaheim	Ginuwine	26,525 / 28,994	$1,742,981
March 12, 2002	Anaheim	United States	Arrowhead Pond of Anaheim	Ginuwine	26,525 / 28,994	$1,742,981
March 14, 2002	Phoenix	United States	America West Arena	Ginuwine; NSBB; Tony Lucca	12,140 / 17,442	$806,218
March 15, 2002	Las Vegas	United States	MGM Grand Garden Arena	Ginuwine; NSBB; Tony Lucca	11,519 / 14,393	$958,090
March 18, 2002	Houston	United States	Compaq Center	Smash Mouth; Tony Lucca	13,059 / 15,394	$950,691
March 19, 2002	San Antonio	United States	Alamodome	Smash Mouth; Tony Lucca	14,569 / 17,667	$1,010,388
March 20, 2002	Dallas	United States	Reunion Arena	Smash Mouth; Tony Lucca	16,545 / 17,667	$1,010,388
March 25, 2002	Denver	United States	Pepsi Center	Smash Mouth; Tony Lucca	12,337 / 15,900	$810,568
March 27, 2002	Ames	United States	Hilton Coliseum	Smash Mouth; Tony Lucca	12,385 / 13,000	$764,528
March 29, 2002	Grand Forks	United States	Alerus Center	Smash Mouth; Tony Lucca	—N/a	—N/a
March 30, 2002	Minneapolis	United States	Target Center	Smash Mouth; Tony Lucca	12,291 / 17,832	$765,881
April 1, 2002	Auburn Hills	United States	The Palace of Auburn Hills	Smash Mouth; Tony Lucca	19,040 / 19,040	$1,133,623
April 2, 2002	Grand Rapids	United States	Van Andel Arena	Smash Mouth; Tony Lucca	9,496 / 10,334	$839,095
April 4, 2002	Rosemont	United States	Allstate Arena	Smash Mouth; Tony Lucca	30,637 / 34,354	$2,910,322
April 5, 2002	Rosemont	United States	Allstate Arena	Smash Mouth; Tony Lucca	30,637 / 34,354	$2,910,322
April 7, 2002	Buffalo	United States	HSBC Arena	Smash Mouth; Tony Lucca	12,854 / 18,221	$829,065
April 9, 2002	Philadelphia	United States	First Union Center	Smash Mouth; Tony Lucca	14,333 / 14,333	$916,847
April 11, 2002	Uniondale	United States	Nassau Veterans Memorial Coliseum	Smash Mouth; Tony Lucca	13,627 / 16,630	$778,395
April 13, 2002	East Rutherford	United States	Continental Airlines Arena	Smash Mouth; P. Diddy; Tony Lucca	36,442 / 38,774	$1,969,370
April 14, 2002	East Rutherford	United States	Continental Airlines Arena	Smash Mouth; P. Diddy; Tony Lucca	36,442 / 38,774	$1,969,370
April 15, 2002	Boston	United States	FleetCenter	P. Diddy; Tony Lucca	33,473 / 35,357	$2,097,028
April 16, 2002	Boston	United States	FleetCenter	P. Diddy; Tony Lucca	33,473 / 35,357	$2,097,028
April 18, 2002	Philadelphia	United States	First Union Center	Tony Lucca	18,297 / 18,297	$1,133,227
April 19, 2002	Hartford	United States	Hartford Civic Center	P. Diddy; Mr. Cheeks	14,948 / 15,262	$1,046,720
April 21, 2002	Washington, D.C.	United States	MCI Center	P. Diddy; Mr. Cheeks	17,656 / 18,373	$1,123,553
April 22, 2002	Pittsburgh	United States	Mellon Arena	P. Diddy; Mr. Cheeks	14,606 / 16,114	$970,801
April 23, 2002	Columbus	United States	Nationwide Arena	P. Diddy; Mr. Cheeks	12,751 / 15,934	$842,307
April 25, 2002	Memphis	United States	Pyramid Arena	P. Diddy; Mr. Cheeks	15,426 / 17,907	$875,904
April 27, 2002	Sunrise	United States	National Car Rental Center	P. Diddy; Mr. Cheeks	14,146 / 18,456	$962,817
April 28, 2002	Orlando	United States	TD Waterhouse Centre	P. Diddy; Mr. Cheeks	14,344 / 16,619	$854,769
Total					510,950 / 583,595 (88%)	$33,356,237

Cancellations and rescheduled shows

March 22, 2002	Toronto, Canada	Air Canada Centre	Cancelled
March 23, 2002	Montreal, Canada	Molson Centre	Cancelled
April 10, 2002	Uniondale, New York	Nassau Veterans Memorial Coliseum	Cancelled
