= PopOdyssey =

2001 concert tour by NSYNC

- Tour by NSYNC
- Tour memorabilia poster
- Associated album: Celebrity
- Start date: May 23, 2001
- End date: September 1, 2001
- Legs: 1
- No. of shows: 44
- Box office: $90.2 million ($164.01 million in 2025 dollars)

NSYNC concert chronology
- No Strings Attached Tour (2000); PopOdyssey (2001); Celebrity Tour (2002)

PopOdyssey was the fourth concert tour by American boy band NSYNC. Sponsored by Verizon Wireless and Chili's, the tour promoted the band's fourth studio album, Celebrity. The tour's name is defined as "an adventurous journey towards popularity, beginning as just a dream and ending in reality". The tour became the biggest production in pop music, beating U2's PopMart Tour. The tour, which visited stadiums, was NSYNC's first to include backup dancers, and is known for its elaborate audio and visual effects which included lasers, fireworks, animation, and suspension wires.

The 2001 tour earned over $90 million, becoming one of the biggest tours of the year. It was also nominated for "Most Creative Stage Production" for Pollstar's "Concert Industry Awards". The tour primarily visited North America.

== Background ==
While promoting their performance at Rock in Rio in 2001, the band stated production was underway on their forthcoming tour. Following the performance, SFX Entertainment announced the band was planning a summer concert tour to promote their upcoming album. Band member Lance Bass said the inspiration for the tour's concept was the film 2001: A Space Odyssey, saying, "We wanted to do 2001: A Pop Odyssey and pay tribute to pop icons. So the whole tour revolves around the meaning of pop and what was popular from the '40s til today." Initially, the tour was expected to begin May 12, 2001 at the Pro Player Stadium in Miami, with English pop group BBMak slated to be the opening act. PopOdyssey was considered "the largest production for a pop concert", as the stage was five stories tall and included three video screens and five mini-stages. The tour was then postponed to May 23, 2001, to ensure that the crew was able to complete the stage construction. NSYNC's third studio album Celebrity was initially planned to be released on June 26, 2001, but was moved to July 24, 2001. As a result, NSYNC decided to perform new songs from Celebrity on the tour before the album was released. Additional tour dates were cancelled due to weather conditions in the South. However, PopOdyssey was one of the most anticipated tours of 2001. Two months into the tour, the band expressed hopes of later bringing their shows back to Europe, where they first toured before their American breakthrough, in addition to Australia; this did not come to fruition.

The opening of PopOdyssey was held at Alltel Stadium in Jacksonville, Florida to positive reviews. They were joined on tour by several pop acts including: Christina Milian, Samantha Mumba and Deborah Gibson. During the show, public service announcements were shown for an anti-drug campaign with the Office of National Drug Control Policy, along with promotional spots for On the Line, a film starring band members Bass and Fatone which was to be released theatrically in the fall of 2001. The band also partnered with the Candie's Foundation to help prevent teen pregnancy. The tour also opened the newly built Heinz Field. Celebrity peaked at number one on the Billboard 200, setting the second-highest record for first-week sales after their previous album No Strings Attached (2000). The tour ended in the Caribbean islands of Turks and Caicos.

=== Synopsis ===
The show begins with a short film that spells out the definitions of the words Pop ("music popular with the general public") and Odyssey ("a long series of travels and adventures") on a typewriter. The words are combined to form PopOdyssey: "an adventurous journey towards popularity, beginning as just a dream and ending in reality." Joey Fatone, dressed as a professor in a classroom, appears in the video and plays a montage that details NSYNC's journey from their origins to the present. Fatone then scrawls the phrase Dirty pop on a chalkboard. Hooded figures appear on the main stage in a nod to NSYNC's previous tour entrances. This turns out to be a misdirection, as the band instead emerges from a midfield stage which connects to the main stage by a long ramp. After kicking off with "Pop," they perform a mash-up of old favorites from their debut album.

NSYNC performing "God Must Have Spent (A Little More Time on You")

After performing newer song "The Two of Us", a film segment of Lance Bass and Chris Kirkpatrick in cowboy attire prefaces "Space Cowboy." The video directs the audience to look upwards, and the guys appear on the rafters of the stage. Harnesses take them flying above the crowds and to the midfield stage. They return to the main stage and each guy rides a futuristic-style mechanical bull.

The guys transition to the ballad "This I Promise You," accompanied only by guitar, piano, and saxophone, and ending with a new harmony by the guys. A 1920s-style film segment titled "There Was Once a Flower" has Justin Timberlake playing a Charlie Chaplin-esque figure (just like in the "Gone" music video) trying to give a flower to his love interest, only to be rejected. The camera zooms in on Timberlake with a tear rolling down his face, saying, "I just can't believe she's gone." The band, dressed in Prohibition era costumes, sing "Gone" while sitting on steps on the main stage. As Timberlake is the main singer in this song, he moves downstage solo to the catwalk and engages in theatrical displays of heartbrokenness.

As Timberlake concludes singing, bandmate Kirkpatrick joins him onstage and the two humorously fight. While both guys spar, the other band mates swarm the stage on go-karts, wagons, and an oversized teddy bear, accompanied by dancers. To the tune of "Pop Goes the Weasel", the guys spray silly string and squirt water guns at the audience. They perform "It's Gonna Be Me" with a toy theme, referencing their music video.

They segue into "See Right Through You," singing and dancing atop moving conveyor belts. For "Up Against the Wall," the guys are bounced onto Velcro walls brought onstage. A short film plays of JC Chasez stuck in a phone call with his gold-digging girlfriend, a phone call that is interrupted by his band mates. Chasez asks the girlfriend "Wait a minute. Do you want me, or what I can buy you?," and the band performs "Celebrity."

On the midfield stage, the guys shift into a downtempo segment as Fatone reads letters written by fans in the audience. The guys perform a trio of ballads, "Something Like You"/"Falling/"Selfish". They switch to the uptempo "No Strings Attached"; there is a gag at the beginning of Timberlake's verse about him "losing his touch." After his fruitless attempts to summon his touch, Timberlake finally joins his hands together to form a fireball effect that sets off a row of fireworks on stage.

The high-tech villain figure Mobius 8 appears midfield playing remixed snippets of NSYNC songs. The guys shoot out onto the main stage from unseen elevators and sing "The Game Is Over," with the screens showing video game effects. The group engages in a video-game "battle" with Mobius. The show ends with "Bye Bye Bye." Each band member goes inside a cage that is covered in drapes. The drapes are then dropped, revealing the cages to be now empty.

== Personnel ==
=== NSYNC ===
- JC Chasez – Lead Tenor Vocals
- Justin Timberlake – Lead Tenor Vocals
- Chris Kirkpatrick – Backing Countertenor Vocals
- Lance Bass – Backing Bass Vocals
- Joey Fatone – Backing Baritone Vocals

=== Band ===
On this tour, all six accompanists returned from the No Strings Attached tour. Two new additions would join the ranks, however

- Kevin Antunes – Music Director, Keyboards
- Troy Antunes – Bass
- Billy Ashbaugh – Drums, Percussion
- Greg Howe – Lead Guitar
- Ruben Ruiz – Rhythm Guitar, Keyboards
- David Cook – Keyboards
- Paul Howards – Saxophone, Percussion, Keyboards
- Juan Sepulveda – Percussion

=== Dancers ===
- Kristin Denehy
- Chantal Robson
- Annalisia Simone Fergason
- Diana Carrendo
- Michele Martinez

== Opening acts ==
- Not So Boy Band (North America—Leg 1,2, select dates)
- BBMak (North America—Leg 1, select dates)
- Christina Milian (North America—Leg 1, select dates)
- Dante Thomas (North America—Leg 1, select dates)
- Debbie Gibson (North America—Leg 1, select dates)
- Dream (North America—Leg 1, select dates)
- Eden's Crush (North America—Leg 1, select dates)
- Li'l Johnnie (North America—Leg 1, select dates)
- Meredith Edwards (North America—Leg 1, select dates)
- Samantha Mumba (North America—Leg 1, select dates)
- 3LW (Chicago, Jacksonville, Hershey)
- Tony Lucca (Jacksonville, Tampa)
- Lil' Romeo (Jacksonville, St. Louis, Houston)
- Amanda (Indianapolis, Pittsburgh, Columbus, New Orleans, Jackson)
- Tonya Mitchell (Oakland, Sacramento, San Jose, San Diego, Anaheim)

== Setlist ==
The following setlist was obtained from the concert held on May 23, 2001, at the Alltel Stadium in Jacksonville, Florida. It does not represent all concerts for the duration of the tour.

1. "Pop"
2. "Tearin' Up My Heart" / "I Want You Back"
3. "(God Must Have Spent) A Little More Time on You" (contains elements of "Music of My Heart")
4. "The Two of Us"
5. "Space Cowboy (Yippie-Yi-Yay)" (contains elements of "Wild Wild West")
6. "This I Promise You"
7. "Gone"
8. "It's Gonna Be Me"
9. "See Right Through You"
10. "Up Against the Wall"
11. "Celebrity"
12. "Something Like You" / "Falling" / "Selfish"
13. "No Strings Attached"

Encore

14. "The Game Is Over" (contains elements of "Can't Stop the Rocket", "Mars: The Bringer of War" from The Planets and "Bye Bye Bye") (featuring Mobius 8)
15. "Bye Bye Bye"

== Tour dates ==
Date	City	Country	Venue	Opening Act
May 23, 2001	Jacksonville	United States	Alltel Stadium	BBMak; 3LW; Tony Lucca; Lil' Romeo
May 26, 2001	Hershey	United States	Hersheypark Stadium	BBMak; 3LW; Tonya Mitchell
May 28, 2001	Hershey	United States	Hersheypark Stadium	BBMak; 3LW; Tonya Mitchell
May 31, 2001	Foxborough	United States	Foxboro Stadium	BBMak; Christina Milian; Dream; Meredith Edwards
June 1, 2001	Foxborough	United States	Foxboro Stadium	BBMak; Christina Milian; Dream; Meredith Edwards
June 3, 2001	East Rutherford	United States	Giants Stadium	BBMak; Christina Milian; Dream; Meredith Edwards
June 4, 2001	East Rutherford	United States	Giants Stadium	BBMak; Christina Milian; Dream; Meredith Edwards
June 5, 2001	East Rutherford	United States	Giants Stadium	BBMak; Christina Milian; Dream; Meredith Edwards
June 8, 2001	Cincinnati	United States	Cinergy Field	BBMak; Christina Milian; Dream; Meredith Edwards
June 10, 2001	Orchard Park	United States	Ralph Wilson Stadium	BBMak; Christina Milian; Dream; Meredith Edwards
June 13, 2001	Philadelphia	United States	Veterans Stadium	BBMak; Christina Milian; Dream; Meredith Edwards
June 16, 2001	Chicago	United States	Soldier Field	BBMak; Christina Milian; Dream; Meredith Edwards; 3LW
June 17, 2001	Chicago	United States	Soldier Field	BBMak; Christina Milian; Meredith Edwards; 3LW
June 19, 2001	Toronto	Canada	SkyDome	BBMak; Eden's Crush; Meredith Edwards
June 21, 2001	Cleveland	United States	Browns Stadium	BBMak; Eden's Crush; Meredith Edwards
June 22, 2001	Cleveland	United States	Browns Stadium	BBMak; Eden's Crush; Meredith Edwards
June 24, 2001	Minneapolis	United States	Metrodome	BBMak; Eden's Crush; Meredith Edwards
June 26, 2001	Milwaukee	United States	Miller Park	BBMak; Eden's Crush; Meredith Edwards
June 29, 2001	Detroit	United States	Comerica Park	BBMak; Eden's Crush; Meredith Edwards
June 30, 2001	Detroit	United States	Comerica Park	BBMak; Eden's Crush; Meredith Edwards
July 2, 2001	St. Louis	United States	Trans World Dome	Dante Thomas; Eden's Crush; Meredith Edwards; Samantha Mumba; Lil' Romeo
July 4, 2001	Little Rock	United States	War Memorial Stadium	Dante Thomas; Eden's Crush; Meredith Edwards; Samantha Mumba
July 6, 2001	Houston	United States	Reliant Astrodome	Dante Thomas; Eden's Crush; Meredith Edwards; Samantha Mumba; Lil' Romeo; Not So Boy Band
July 8, 2001	Irving	United States	Texas Stadium	Dante Thomas; Eden's Crush; Meredith Edwards; Samantha Mumba; Not So Boy Band
July 10, 2001	Kansas City	United States	Arrowhead Stadium	Dante Thomas; Eden's Crush; Meredith Edwards; Samantha Mumba
July 13, 2001	Denver	United States	Mile High Stadium	Dante Thomas; Eden's Crush; Meredith Edwards; Samantha Mumba
July 16, 2001	San Diego	United States	Qualcomm Stadium	Dante Thomas; Eden's Crush; Meredith Edwards; Samantha Mumba
July 18, 2001	Phoenix	United States	Bank One Ballpark	Dante Thomas; Eden's Crush; Meredith Edwards; Samantha Mumba
July 21, 2001	Oakland	United States	Network Associates Stadium	Dante Thomas; Eden's Crush; Meredith Edwards; Samantha Mumba; Tonya Mitchell
July 22, 2001	Oakland	United States	Network Associates Stadium	Dante Thomas; Eden's Crush; Meredith Edwards; Samantha Mumba; Tonya Mitchell
July 24, 2001	Pasadena	United States	Rose Bowl	Not So Boy Band; Samantha Mumba; Eden's Crush; Meredith Edwards; Tonya Mitchell
July 27, 2001	Whitney	United States	Sam Boyd Stadium	Not So Boy Band; Eden's Crush; Meredith Edwards; Tonya Mitchell
July 31, 2001	Tampa	United States	Raymond James Stadium	Not So Boy Band; Samantha Mumba; Eden's Crush; Meredith Edwards; Tony Lucca
August 5, 2001	San Antonio	United States	Alamodome	Meredith Edwards
August 9, 2001	Louisville	United States	Cardinal Stadium	Meredith Edwards
August 11, 2001	Atlanta	United States	Georgia Dome	Meredith Edwards
August 13, 2001	Washington, D.C.	United States	RFK Stadium	Meredith Edwards; Amanda
August 16, 2001	Indianapolis	United States	RCA Dome	Debbie Gibson; Amanda
August 18, 2001	Pittsburgh	United States	Heinz Field	Debbie Gibson; Amanda
August 20, 2001	Columbus	United States	Columbus Crew Stadium	Debbie Gibson; Amanda
August 22, 2001	New Orleans	United States	Louisiana Superdome	Debbie Gibson; Amanda; Lil' Romeo
August 24, 2001	Jackson	United States	Mississippi Veterans Memorial Stadium	Debbie Gibson; Amanda
August 27, 2001	El Paso	United States	Sun Bowl Stadium	Debbie Gibson
September 1, 2001	Mexico City	Mexico	Estadio Azteca	Christina Milian

Cancellations and rescheduled shows

May 12, 2001	Miami, Florida	Pro Player Stadium	Rescheduled to August 2, 2001; later cancelled
May 15, 2001	St. Petersburg, Florida	Tropicana Field	Rescheduled to July 31, 2001. Moved to Raymond James Stadium in Tampa, Florida
May 18, 2001	Jacksonville, Florida	Alltel Stadium	Rescheduled to May 23, 2001
May 20, 2001	Jackson, Mississippi	Mississippi Veterans Memorial Stadium	Rescheduled to August 24, 2001.
May 22, 2001	Charlotte, North Carolina	Ericsson Stadium	Cancelled
May 24, 2001	Atlanta, Georgia	Georgia Dome	Rescheduled to August 11, 2001
May 30, 2001	Foxborough, Massachusetts	Foxboro Stadium	Cancelled
June 10, 2001	Plattsburgh, New York	Plattsburgh Air Force Base	Cancelled
June 26, 2001	Green Bay, Wisconsin	Lambeau Field	Cancelled
June 29, 2001	Pontiac, Michigan	Pontiac Silverdome	Moved to Comerica Park in Detroit
July 31, 2001	Las Cruces, New Mexico	Aggie Memorial Stadium	Cancelled
August 2, 2001	Miami, Florida	Hard Rock Stadium	Cancelled due to the effects of Tropical Storm Barry
August 7, 2001	Birmingham, Alabama	Legion Field	Cancelled due to the effects of Tropical Storm Barry
August 11, 2001	Vancouver, Canada	BC Place Stadium	Cancelled
August 18, 2001	Memphis, Tennessee	Liberty Bowl Memorial Stadium	Cancelled
August 20, 2001	Lexington, Kentucky	Commonwealth Stadium	Cancelled

=== Box office score data ===
Venue	City	Tickets sold / Available	Gross revenue
Alltel Stadium	Jacksonville	42,218 / 71,256 (59%)	$2,030,372
Hersheypark Stadium	Hershey	61,996 / 66,222 (94%)	$3,252,128
Foxboro Stadium	Foxborough	44,858 / 48,089 (93%)	$4,744,485
Giants Stadium	East Rutherford	154,359 / 176,817 (87%)	$7,364,012
Cinergy Field	Cincinnati	36,371 / 42,285 (86%)	$1,947,461
Ralph Wilson Stadium	Orchard Park	43,406 / 55,874 (78%)	$2,175,436
Veterans Stadium	Philadelphia	46,005 / 54,212 (85%)	$2,534,204
Soldier Field	Chicago	85,650 / 103,903 (82%)	$4,739,359
Miller Park	Milwaukee	34,148 / 44,978 (76%)	$1,956,157
TransWorld Dome	St. Louis	31,790 / 48,808 (65%)	$1,708,437
War Memorial Stadium	Little Rock	31,062 / 41,126 (75%)	$1,517,261
Reliant Astrodome	Houston	44,116 / 65,144 (68%)	$2,328,582
Texas Stadium	Irving	44,564 / 44,564 (100%)	$2,374,325
Arrowhead Stadium	Kansas City	40,863 / 53,143 (77%)	$2,107,135
Bank One Ballpark	Phoenix	42,959 / 49,111 (87%)	$2,213,026
Rose Bowl	Pasadena	62,196 / 62,196 (100%)	$3,154,129
Sam Boyd Stadium	Las Vegas	29,003 / 38,100 (76%)	$1,297,973
Alamodome	San Antonio	55,206 / 67,573 (82%)	$3,000,974
RFK Stadium	Washington, D.C.	41,831 / 47,962 (87%)	$2,232,680
Heinz Field	Pittsburgh	48,118 / 56,275 (85%)	$2,558,856
Sun Bowl Stadium	El Paso	38,313 / 48,987 (78%)	$2,048,331
TOTAL		1,014,174 / 1,238,536	$52,540,838

== Broadcasts and recordings ==
Promotional concerts setlist
Atlantis	Winter Olympics
"It's Gonna Be Me"; "Pop"; Medley: "Tearin' Up My Heart"; "I Want You Back"; "Up Against the Wall"; Medley (with Tim McGraw): "Stand by Me"; "Fire and Rain"; "Lean on Me"; "Girlfriend"; "This I Promise You"; "Gone"; "Angel Boy" (McGraw solo); "Bye Bye Bye"	"Pop"; Medley: "Tearin' Up My Heart"; "I Want You Back"; "(God Must Have Spent) A Little More Time on You"; "It's Gonna Be Me"; "This I Promise You"; "No Strings Attached"; "Thinking of You (I Drive Myself Crazy)"; "Gone"; "Bye Bye Bye"

The tour was documented for video during the concert at the Louisiana Superdome in New Orleans. Bandmember JC Chasez mentioned the band chose to film at that venue because rehearsals were held at that facility. The VHS, entitled *NSYNC: PopOdyssey Live, was released on November 21, 2001. A DVD edition was released on April 23, 2002. The DVD featured the entire concert along with special features, which included: interviews with each bandmember, behind-the-scenes Easter eggs, photo gallery, profile of each musician, web links and a documentary. A special intro video was made for the video release to explain the meaning of the tour name. The original video shown at the beginning of each concert was made available as a special feature. For the Celebrity Tour, the concert at the TD Waterhouse Centre was filmed for a possible DVD release. However, the footage was deemed "unusable" and not released. Bootleg DVDs were sold on eBay in 2003 with amateur footage of the concert in Anaheim. A professionally filmed video montage appeared on YouTube in 2006.

Before the group began the Celebrity Tour, they performed a few promotional concerts that aired on television. The first was a CBS Thanksgiving special entitled "*NSYNC: The Atlantis Concert". The show was filmed at the Atlantis Paradise Island on November 14 and 15, 2001. The concert was exclusive to guests of the hotel and featured duets with country recording artist, Tim McGraw. The special aired on November 23, 2001 alongside The Rugrats Movie. This concert was followed with another promotional performance. To celebrate the 2002 Winter Olympics, the band was one of the headlining performers for the "Olympic Celebration Concert Series". The concert was filmed at the Olympic Medals Plaza on February 23, 2002. The concert aired live on NBC.

== Critical reception ==
The tour received generally positive reviews for its lavish visual effects, the band's stage presence, and the group's new songs from Celebrity. Scott Mervis of the Pittsburgh Post-Gazette called the show at RFK Stadium the "mother of all stadium tours", and Jon Bream of the Star Tribune noted the effects were bigger, brighter and bolder than their last tour. For the debut concert at Altell Stadium, Nick Marino of The Florida Times-Union wrote that despite the massive stage, the band's stage presence was out of this world. Marino stated PopOdyssey is "a big pop show, an expensive pop show, but a pop show all the same. NSYNC realizes (thank goodness) that they are famous, in part, for being famous, and they're using that fact as the touchstone for this entire tour. Pretty smart".

Bream also noted, "This time around, the Prefab Five seemed to be projecting more of an attitude, as if some of the songs and the messages on the video screen were flipping a figurative finger at critics. The feistiness adds a much-needed edge, but if critics are NSYNC's biggest gripe, these guys have nothing to complain about". Sean Richardson of the Boston Phoenix thought the show at Foxboro Stadium was "colorful", praising the humor of the vignettes and the audience engagement. Peter Debruge from Entertainment Weekly said the show at Hersheypark Stadium more closely resembled a Super Bowl halftime show than a traditional concert, saying, "Love them or hate them, you've got to admit NSYNC puts on a killer show".

Jane Stevenson of Jam! gave the SkyDome show three and a half out of five stars. She stated the band's decision to perform 10 songs from Celebrity as part of their 18-song set list was risky but wise, and that the "more dance-oriented tunes...will only help to spur sales" of the new album. In a review of the opening show of the band's three-night run at Giants Stadium, Neil Strauss of The New York Times compared the show to U2's PopMart Tour, stating that PopOdyssey "was everything that U2's PopMart was afraid to be—sheer spectacle for the sake of nothing but spectacle." Though Strauss said the opening number "Pop" was not as strong of a single as "Bye Bye Bye," he commented the band showed a more aggressive side in showing they write their own songs. Strauss singled out the new song "The Game Is Over" for its "futuristic urban twist...with a skittering, robotic video-game beat."

Critics also argued the increased use of dazzling effects distracted from the music and performance. Writing about the Giants Stadium concert, Isaac Guzman of the New York Daily News considered the show to be "all sizzle, no steak". In a review of the Chicago show, Phil Gallo of Variety felt "many fans will have trouble digesting all the audiovisual information on offer" and that the production lacked cohesiveness. Gallo also noted that while the first half of the show seems focused on JC Chasez, "the second half is almost all Justin Timberlake, the heartthrob who does a fine job in the band's faux silent movie...during "Gone," arguably the band's strongest ballad in its three-album career."

Of PopOdyssey's heavy use of effects, Chris Kirkpatrick said the band felt they needed these elements because it was a stadium tour. He commented, "When you're playing in the middle of a giant stadium you have to make it big and you have to be big. It was called the 'Pop Odyssey.' It was a spectacle more than anything else. The music was a big part, but we put a lot into just making it a great show." The band returned to a more stripped-down, less flashier setting when they embarked on the Celebrity tour in March 2002.
