= Celebrity (album) =

2001 studio album by NSYNC

Studio album by NSYNC
- Released: July 18, 2001
- Recorded: January – March 2001
- Studio: Backroom, Glendale, California; Battery, New York City; Carpal Tunnel, Los Angeles; Clinton, New York City; Larrabee North, Universal City, California; Location, Stockholm, Sweden; Metalworks, Mississauga, Canada; Parc, Orlando, Florida; Record Plant, Los Angeles; Right Track, New York City; Sound Chamber, North Hollywood, Los Angeles; Westlake, Los Angeles; Wire, Orlando, Florida
- Genre: Pop; R&B; teen pop
- Length: 49:57
- Label: Jive
- Producer: BT; JC Chasez; Rodney Jerkins; Roy "Royalty" Hamilton; Kristian Lundin; Brian McKnight; The Neptunes; PAJAM; Rami Yacoub; Riprock 'n' Alex G; Wade J. Robson; Jake Schulze; Justin Timberlake; Robin Wiley

NSYNC chronology
No Strings Attached (2000)	Celebrity (2001)	Greatest Hits (2005)

Singles from Celebrity
- 1. "Pop" Released: May 14, 2001; 2. "Gone" Released: August 21, 2001; 3. "Girlfriend" Released: January 14, 2002

Celebrity is the fourth and final studio album by American boy band NSYNC. It was released by Jive Records on July 24, 2001. Due to constant criticism that they were not a "credible group", NSYNC began experimenting with genres such as hip hop and two-step. As with their previous studio album, No Strings Attached (2000), numerous producers, including BT, Rodney Jerkins, Brian McKnight, PAJAM, and the Neptunes, worked on the album. Justin Timberlake and JC Chasez also contributed to production, while they co-wrote 10 of 13 tracks in an attempt to develop a unique sound, which includes pop, R&B, and teen pop.

After being delayed by unfinished recording sessions, Celebrity was released to generally favorable reviews from music critics, many of whom praised the production and songwriting. The album was the band's second album to debut at number one on the US Billboard 200 chart, with first week sales of 1,879,495 copies in the US, which became the second-best debut week sales in the country. It was also the third-best selling album on the Billboard 200 in 2001, after Shaggy's Hot Shot (2000) and Linkin Park's Hybrid Theory (2000), and has since been certified quintuple platinum in the US by the Recording Industry Association of America (RIAA). NSYNC embarked on the accompanying PopOdyssey and Celebrity tours for promotion.

== Background and development ==
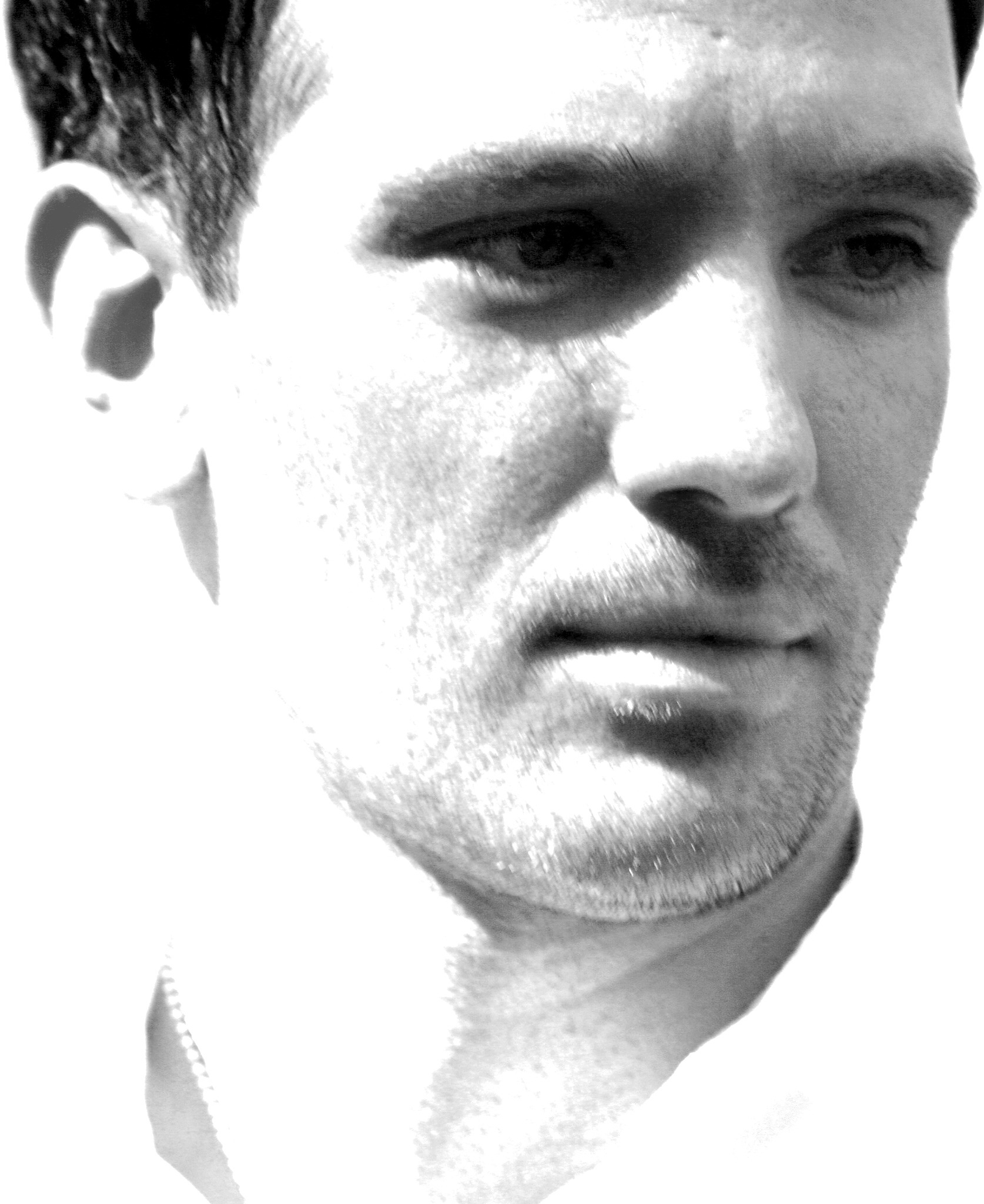
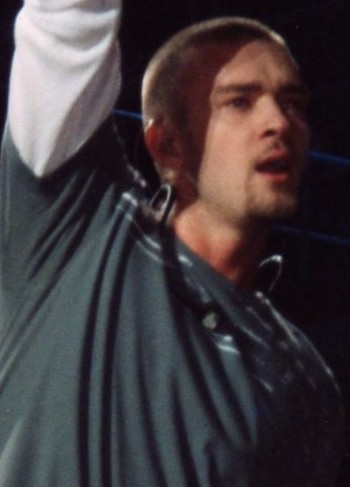
JC Chasez and Justin Timberlake co-wrote 10 of 13 songs on the album in order to experiment with different sounds and genres.

At the 2000 Billboard Music Awards on December 5, NSYNC announced they would begin "experimenting with new music" for their third studio album at a recording studio in Florida during January and February 2001. Justin Timberlake said the band planned to spend two months in the studio to come up with ideas, while Joey Fatone stated that they may leave Florida as the album progresses. NSYNC also said they wanted to collaborate with Kevin "She'kspere" Briggs and Richard Marx, with whom they had worked on their third studio album No Strings Attached (2000).

Although No Strings Attached sold 14 million copies worldwide, including a record 2.4 million in the United States during its first week, critics ridiculed the band, who did not match the critics' perceptions as a "credible group" and were not considered "artistic". In response to this, NSYNC decided to be more involved in production, co-writing 10 of the 13 tracks on Celebrity. JC Chasez discussed the recording process in an interview with Billboard: "Our objective was not to be self-conscious and try to make another hit record. Instead, we set out to make a record that was more reflective of what turns us on musically. We also wanted to prove that pop music comes in a lot of different flavors. It's not all bubble-gum." The band decided to assign roles for each member to combat media perception of "leadership roles within the group". Timberlake and Chasez worked on the album's production and music, while Lance Bass was assigned to handle business and management, and Fatone started to plan the supporting tour alongside Chris Kirkpatrick. Celebrity finished production in June 2001.

== Recording and production ==
NSYNC sought out several collaborators to add new styles to their sound for Celebrity. BT was recruited when Chasez, a fan of BT's music, befriended the producer at shows. Though initially hesitant to work with the band as their styles were opposite from each other, BT finally agreed when Timberlake told him he could do whatever he wanted with the group's vocals. Timberlake told BT he wanted the track to sound like "The Hip Hop Phenomenon" on the UK version of BT's 1999 album Movement in Still Life, to which BT responded, "If you wanna do something that punk-rock, I'll do it." During the production of "Pop", BT tried 40 different treatments for vocals, with him using equipment that is commonly used for movie sound effects, and he constantly shouted Michael Jackson's name at Timberlake to inspire him. BT changed the song from "new-school R&B, Timbaland-style beats, to progressive house".

NSYNC choreographer Wade Robson also took on a bigger role for the band as he co-wrote and produced multiple tracks for Celebrity, including "Pop", "Gone", and the title track. "Gone" was initially written as a duet between Timberlake and Jackson, but was declined by Jackson. Timberlake took the song to NSYNC's A&R team and the band later recorded it. Jackson changed his mind after the song's release and wanted it to be performed only as a duet between himself and Timberlake, but they could not find a way to rewrite the song. American production duo the Neptunes produced Celebrity's third single "Girlfriend". Timberlake was determined to get American musician Stevie Wonder to play the harmonica for "Something Like You" after Timberlake composed the song with his songwriting partner Robin Wiley. Wonder recorded the harmonica part after Jive Records contacted him, with Timberlake describing his presence as a "surreal moment". Brad Daymond and Alex Greggs, known as Riprock 'n' Alex G, returned from No Strings Attached to write and produce three tracks: "The Two of Us", "Up Against the Wall", and "The Game is Over". Bass stated that "The Two of Us" was inspired by the music of Craig David.

== Composition and lyrical content ==
Celebrity includes elements of several musical genres, including pop, R&B, and teen pop. In contrast to No Strings Attached, the decision to experiment with different sounds on songs such as "Pop" was made so NSYNC could appear more mature and musically diverse. The album fuses sounds from NSYNC's earlier songs, such as "Bye Bye Bye" (2000) with experimental genres, including hip hop and British two-step. Several of the producers who worked on Celebrity influenced the unique sound of each track, which was attributed to the band's self-awareness and desire to accentuate different aspects of their music.

The album's first track, "Pop", refers to NSYNC's defense of the pop genre towards their critics. Larry Flick of Billboard described the song as "a crafty, anthemic blend of Cameo-style electro-funk beats, Euro-pop synths, heavy-metal guitars, and Timberlake's now-signature human beat-box riffs", while John Hugar of Uproxx referred to it as "a sort of proto-salvo against in the rockist vs. poptimists argument", and called the song a preview of Timberlake's 2003 single "Rock Your Body". The next track, "Celebrity", was produced by Rodney Jerkins, who used "low-key, funksome, two-step slither" along with camera clicks. The lyrics outline the negative consequences of being "a multi-millionaire, globe-trotting pop star", while Jon O'Brien of Billboard noted that the song is influenced by the Blackstreet and Janet Jackson song "Girlfriend/Boyfriend" (1999). "The Game is Over", according to Barry Walters of Rolling Stone, includes the "Pac-Man theme and dance-y squeaks", and "echoes the sounds and sentiments of the last album's edgiest cuts". The fourth track, "Girlfriend", is an R&B song that was produced by the Neptunes. A remix of the track that features rapper Nelly was noted for giving the song a hip hop influence. Nelly raps over a minimal guitar figure for two verses; the first which lasted for 61 seconds before the song's first verse. "The Two of Us" is an "R&B waltz" containing a "British dancefloor beat", which was compared to that of "Digital Get Down" from No Strings Attached. Staff writers at Billboard considered the ballad "Gone" to be "harrowing, relentless and unmistakably final". Hugar noted "Gone" as the precursor to Timberlake's second single "Cry Me a River" (2002).

"Tell Me, Tell Me... Baby" was written by Max Martin and includes elements of Europop. According to O'Brien, the song contains "larger than life beats, swelling strings" and a bombastic chorus, which serves as a "blatant throwback". "Up Against the Wall" is an R&B song that features two-step garage elements; it was compared to Billy Joel's song "Get It Right the First Time" from his 1977 album The Stranger, while the middle eight was compared to songs by the UK garage group So Solid Crew. "See Right Through You", the ninth track on Celebrity, has an R&B sound; according to David Browne of Entertainment Weekly, the song is "another tale of betrayal by scheming girls". The Brian McKnight-produced track "Selfish" combines the vocals of Chasez and Timberlake with an adult contemporary track. "Just Don't Tell Me That", a teen pop track, is similar to songs by Britney Spears and the Backstreet Boys. The song's lyrics describe a "fame-seeking girlfriend" spending too much time at the Playboy Mansion. According to Browne, "Something Like You" is a "squishy ballad with drooling-puppy harmonies and lyrics". The chorus was compared to the Boyz II Men song "4 Seasons of Loneliness". The US version of the album's final song "Do Your Thing" contains "stuttering electronic beats" and a bar by the songwriter J. Moss. Browne described the song as "mild electronica"; "Do Your Thing" is included on Celebrity because Jive Records wanted a song that showcased NSYNC's vocal talents and harmony.

== Artwork and title ==
The artwork of Celebrity depicts the band walking on a red carpet while surrounded by flashing cameras and a crowd. Jackie Murphy created the artwork, which was photographed by Mark Seliger. Writing for AllMusic, Stephen Thomas Erlewine considered the garish cover art to be a hybrid of the cover of the Beatles' 1967 album Sgt. Pepper's Lonely Hearts Club Band and music videos by alternative rock band Sammy, and said the title Celebrity "none too subtly [draws] attention to the fact that they're stars". Ariana Bacle of Entertainment Weekly stated the appearance of each member on the artwork is "tame" in comparison to that of NSYNC's 1997 eponymous debut studio album, specifically criticizing Chasez and Joey Fatone's highlights for seeking unneeded attention.

== Release and promotion ==
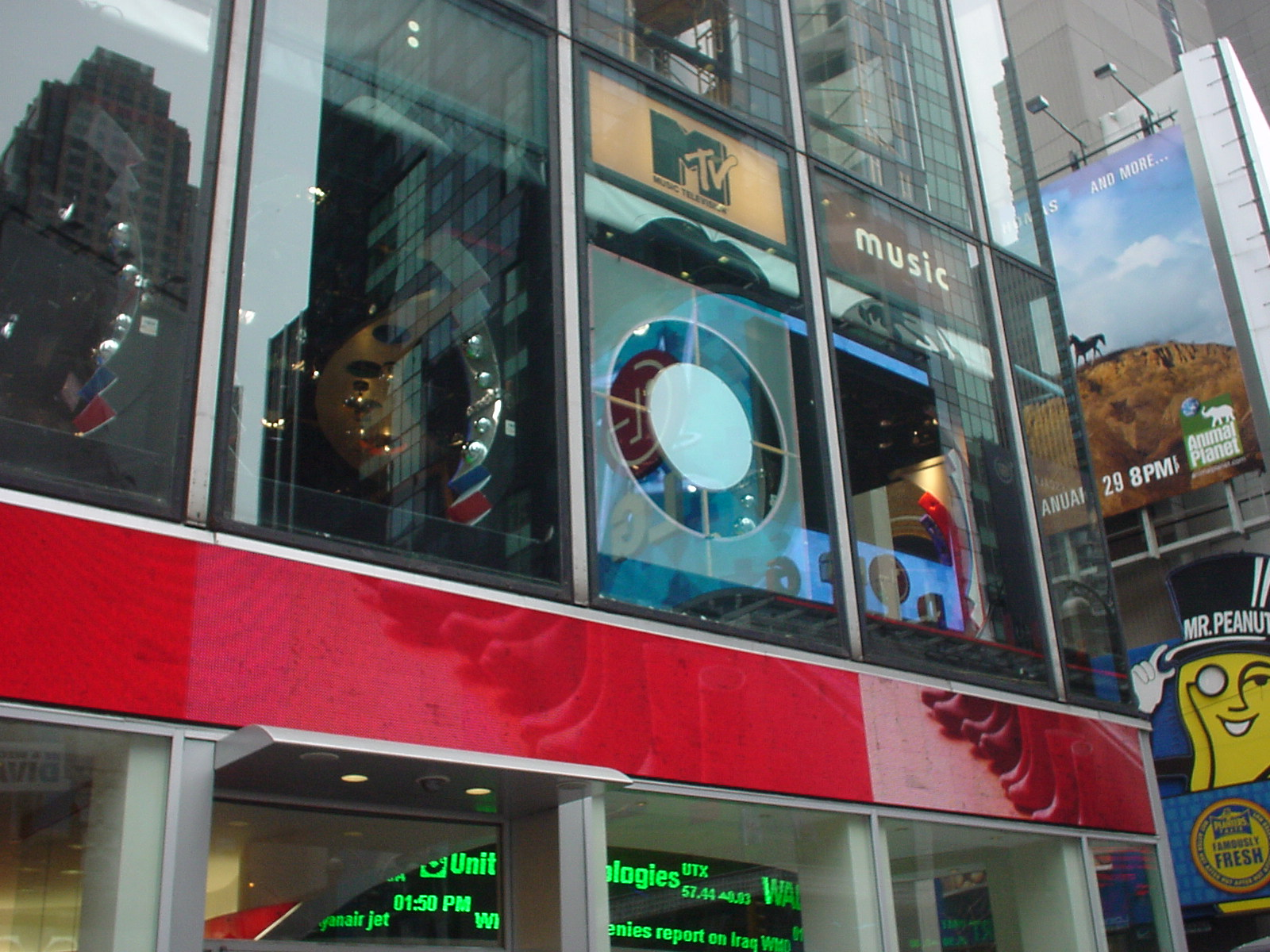
NSYNC appeared on Total Request Live to promote Celebrity on its release date.

The album was officially announced on April 2, 2001, as Celebrity, with Jive Records having intentions to release an "uptempo" first single later that month. On May 11, 2001, MTV played a recording of "Pop" via satellite during NSYNC's tour rehearsal for PopOdyssey, leading to the song's release to radio stations as the album's lead single three days later. Celebrity was initially set to be released on June 26, 2001, with the opening date of PopOdyssey on May 12, 2001. The tour was postponed to May 18, 2001, because the staging was still in development, and the album's release date was postponed to July 24, 2001. NSYNC decided to perform the tracks from Celebrity on tour before its release. The tour was sponsored by Verizon, which launched several television and radio advertising campaigns across the US in promotion of the album and its release date. In an interview with Billboard, Chasez stated the concept of playing new songs at a concert was unusual but he felt it was a good sign that the crowd was actively participating. Jive Records president Barry Weiss was surprised by the band's touring approach, acknowledging the audience response would indicate "an album of immeasurable creative and commercial depth".

MTV broadcast a television special entitled The Road to Celebrity on July 21 and 22, 2001. The premiere of Celebrity, which included celebrities such as Britney Spears, Hugh Hefner, the Olsen Twins, and Aisha Tyler, was held at West Hollywood on July 23, 2001. NSYNC also played several songs at a tailgate party in the parking lot and appeared on MTV's Total Request Live on July 24, 2001, coinciding with the date of the album's ultimate release. To promote Celebrity, NSYNC appeared on The Rosie O'Donnell Show, The Tonight Show with Jay Leno, and Today, between June and August 2001. On the August 2001 magazine issue of Rolling Stone, each NSYNC member was featured on an individual cover, in addition to a cover with the all the members. The recording process and promotional cycle for Celebrity was more condensed than their previous albums, as the group scrambled to finish the album while planning for PopOdyssey. Chasez stated that the recording, promoting and touring process was "everything at once".

=== Tours ===
NSYNC embarked on two concert tours to promote the album. The first was PopOdyssey, which began on May 23, 2001, in Jacksonville, Florida, and concluded on September 1, 2001, in Mexico City. The tour's set was a five-story-high main stage with several smaller stages surrounding it, with the setup being transported by 88 trucks in comparison to the 19 trucks used for their No Strings Attached Tour (2000). Earning over $90 million, PopOdyssey was the second biggest tour of 2001. The band's second tour for Celebrity was the Celebrity Tour, which began on March 3, 2002, in Portland, Oregon, and concluded on April 28, 2002, in Orlando, Florida. In contrast to PopOdyssey, the tour favored music over spectacle and incorporated their older songs with new arrangements. It earned $33 million.

== Critical reception ==
Professional ratings
Aggregate scores
Source	Rating
Metacritic	65/100
Review scores
Source	Rating
AllMusic	4.5/5 stars
Blender	4/5 stars
Dotmusic	5/10
E!	B
Entertainment Weekly	B
NME	4/5 stars
Q	3/5 stars
Rolling Stone	3/5 stars
The Rolling Stone Album Guide	3/5 stars
Slant Magazine	3/5 stars

Celebrity was met with generally favorable reviews from music critics. At Metacritic, which assigns a normalized rating out of 100 to reviews from mainstream critics, the album received an average score of 65 based on 11 reviews, indicating "generally favorable" reviews.

Erlewine said Celebrity is NSYNC's "most varied album yet" and called it a highlight from the teen-pop era of 1999–2001, and praised the musicianship of Timberlake, Chasez, and the songwriters. J.D. Considine of Blender said the album "shines brightest when the group matures enough to forget about its image and focus on the tunes". Alex Needham of NME wrote that although NSYNC display feelings of discontent on Celebrity, they "have the tunes to make up for it". In one of his "Consumer Guide" reviews, Robert Christgau gave the album a one-star honorable mention, writing, "they survive writing their own songs", highlighting "Selfish" and "Do Your Thing". Neil Strauss of The New York Times singled out "The Game Is Over," with its "skittering, robotic video-game beat" as an impressive track.

Browne stated that Celebrity is "the consummate teen-pop experience", listing R&B, ballads, self-expression and Europop as examples of genres included. He also said it is "pleasant filler and nothing more". Walters said the anxiety in the singers' vocals allowed them to "pave a new high road for teen pop's future", and that he found the band's calling out of "anonymous gold diggers" on several tracks tiresome. Writing for Slant, Sal Cinquemani criticized the album for being "slightly overcooked and a tad overzealous", saying it is unfortunate NSYNC "couldn't completely discard the classic hit-making formula in favor of the more experimental pop that seems so inherent in this and their last album". He said NSYNC could become "The Beatles of their generation" if they abandoned the pop genre and survived the growing pains and the aging of their fans. The staff of Q said Celebrity is "quality froth" despite not being good, and the E! Online staff stated that 13-year-old girls would love the album while others will only reluctantly appreciate it.

Dotmusic's Cyd Jaymes was critical of Celebrity, praising the first track "Pop" for being one of the best singles of 2001, but describing the remainder of the album as "formulaic, less-than-meaty balladeering and the odd glimmer of upbeat hope", and largely underwhelming. Jason Thompson of PopMatters described it as "threadbare cookie crunch" and accused the band of setting double-standards for their fans, saying NSYNC "enjoy flaunting their own image while at the same time playing a candy-ass game of 'don't like us only for our status'".

== Commercial performance ==
In the US, Celebrity debuted at number one on the Billboard 200. Although it did not sell as many copies as No Strings Attached, Celebrity, selling 1,879,955 copies, it had the second-best debut week sales at the time since Nielsen SoundScan had begun monitoring record retailers in 1991. Billboard said the album's failure to match the first-week sales of its predecessor was due to the 2001 US economy's weaker state in comparison with the previous year, as well as the first decline in album sales in more than a decade. On August 22, 2001, Celebrity was certified quintuple platinum by the Recording Industry Association of America (RIAA), denoting shipments of 5,000,000 units in the US. It became the third best-selling album of 2001, selling 4.42 million copies. Sales of the album were marginally lower than those of Shaggy's Hot Shot by 86,000 copies, which only beat it in the cassette format; Hot Shot sold 304,000 tapes while Celebrity only sold 92,000 tapes. Celebrity was ranked at number nine on the Billboard 200 year-end chart for 2001. As of March 2015, the album had sold 5,002,000 copies in the US according to Nielsen Music. It has sold an additional 826,000 units at the BMG Music Club, as of February 2003.

Celebrity debuted at number one in Canada on the Canadian Albums Chart, selling 71,254 copies, which was the biggest first-week album sales of 2001. It was certified double platinum by Music Canada (MC) for selling over 200,000 units in the country on November 7, 2001. In the United Kingdom, the album sold 13,000 units in its debut week, entering at number 12 on the UK Albums Chart. Celebrity was certified gold by the British Phonographic Industry (BPI) for selling over 100,000 copies in the UK on May 17, 2002. Several European companies reported slow album sales, including Fnac in France and Spain, WOM in Germany, and Ricordi in Italy. The album sold 20,000 units in the first week in Japan, where it peaked at number 11 on the Oricon Albums Chart. Celebrity peaked at number 10 on Australia's ARIA Albums chart, and was certified gold by the Australian Recording Industry Association (ARIA) for selling over 35,000 units in the country. In 2001 Celebrity was the ninth best-selling album globally, selling 6.5 million copies.

== Legacy ==
At the end of the Celebrity Tour in May 2002, NSYNC went on hiatus to take time off from touring and recording and to accommodate for Timberlake's desire to record a solo album. Although the hiatus was planned to be temporary, with the band intending to record a fifth album once Timberlake released his album, they did not return to record together in the studio for 21 years, until the release of the song "Better Place" in 2023.

Celebrity is retrospectively seen as "a logical swan song" for NSYNC because it came after the record-breaking commercial success of No Strings Attached and before the band's eventual dissolution. Music critics observed that the album was the basis for Timberlake's solo career, as the album's singles consisted of only songs Timberlake co-wrote, in addition to album promotion that centered around Timberlake. Hugar compared Celebrity to Zayn Malik's and Harry Styles' desires for solo stardom after One Direction's hiatus, concluding that it is "a reminder that boy bands are rarely built to last". NPR's Maria Sherman stated the album shifted the band further towards the R&B genre and "firmly established Timberlake as the bandleader and pushed Chasez's powerful pop vocals to the periphery". Andrew Unterberger of Billboard acknowledged that Celebrity contained sounds which "pushes pop music into the future".

== Track listing ==
Track listing and credits are adapted from the album's liner notes. All lead vocals were provided by Justin Timberlake and JC Chasez.

Track listings for the North American edition
No.	Title	Writer(s)	Producer(s)	Length
1.	"Pop"	Justin Timberlake; Wade J. Robson	BT; Timberlake; Robson	3:59
2.	"Celebrity"	Timberlake; Robson; J. Valentine	Rodney Jerkins; Timberlake; Robson	3:19
3.	"The Game Is Over"	JC Chasez; Alex Greggs; Bradley Daymond	Riprock 'n' Alex G; Chasez	3:27
4.	"Girlfriend"	Timberlake; Chad Hugo; Pharrell Williams	The Neptunes	4:15
5.	"The Two of Us"	Chasez; Greggs; Daymond	Riprock 'n' Alex G; Chasez	3:52
6.	"Gone"	Timberlake; Robson	Timberlake; Robson	4:55
7.	"Tell Me, Tell Me... Baby"	Max Martin; Rami Yacoub	Yacoub	3:39
8.	"Up Against the Wall"	Chasez; Timberlake; Greggs; Daymond	Riprock 'n' Alex G; Chasez	3:38
9.	"See Right Through You"	Timberlake; Larry "Rock" Campbell; Robson	Timberlake; Robson	2:55
10.	"Selfish"	Chasez; Jolyon Skinner	Brian McKnight	4:20
11.	"Just Don't Tell Me That"	Kristian Lundin; Jake Schulze; Andreas Carlsson	Lundin; Schulze	3:03
12.	"Something Like You"	Timberlake; Robbie Buchanan; Robin Wiley; Jay Landers	Timberlake; Buchanan; Wiley	4:16
13.	"Do Your Thing"	James Moss	PAJAM	4:19
Total length:				49:57

Track listings for the International edition
No.	Title	Writer(s)	Producer(s)	Length
13.	"That Girl (Will Never Be Mine)" (bonus track)	Lundin; Schulze; Carlsson	Lundin; Schulze	3:24
14.	"Falling" (bonus track)	Chris Kirkpatrick; Bryan Popin; Gary Brown; Ira Schickman	Roy "Royalty" Hamilton; Mystery	3:48
15.	"Do Your Thing"	Moss	PAJAM	4:19
Total length:				57:09

Track listings for the Special edition
No.	Title	Writer(s)	Producer(s)	Length
16.	"Pop" (Pablo La Rosa's Funktified Mix)	Timberlake; Robson	BT; Timberlake; Robson	5:38
17.	"Pop" (Databass Remix)	Timberlake; Robson	BT; Timberlake; Robson	5:31
18.	"Gone" (Gone Clubbin' (I'll Be Back Late) Mix)	Timberlake; Robson	Timberlake; Robson	5:57
19.	"Girlfriend" (The Neptunes Remix featuring Nelly)	Timberlake; Hugo; Williams	The Neptunes	4:43
Total length:				78:59

Track listings for the UK special edition bonus disc
No.	Title	Length
1.	"Pop" (Pablo La Rosa's Funktified Remix)	5:38
2.	"Pop" (Deep Dish Cha-Ching Mix)	11:49
3.	"Pop" (Terminalhead Vocal Mix)	5:35
4.	"Gone" (Gone Clubbin' I'll Be Back Late Remix)	5:57
5.	"Gone" (Spanish version)	4:22
6.	"Girlfriend" (The Neptunes Remix featuring Nelly)	4:43
7.	"Girlfriend" (The Neptunes Remix Instrumental)	4:43
8.	"Pop" (music video)	3:57
9.	"Gone" (music video)	4:51
10.	"Girlfriend" (music video)	4:13
Total length:		54:45

== Credits and personnel ==
Credits are adapted from AllMusic.

NSYNC

- Lance Bass – bass background vocals
- JC Chasez – tenor lead vocals, producer
- Joey Fatone – baritone background vocals
- Chris Kirkpatrick – countertenor background vocals
- Justin Timberlake – tenor lead vocals, arranger, multi instruments, producer, beatbox

Instrumentation

- Kenny Blank – guitar
- Bryan Popin – piano, cello, strings
- Richard Fortus – bass guitar, electric guitar
- Hampton String Quartet – strings
- Michael Landau – electric guitar
- Michael Lang – piano
- Michael Hart Thompson – acoustic guitar
- Anthony Nance – drum programming
- Esbjörn Öhrwall – guitar
- WaWa – chant
- Stevie Wonder – harmonica
- Yasu – string engineer

Production

- BT – arranger, programming, producer, engineer, mixing
- Rodney Jerkins – multi instruments, producer
- Kristian Lundin – producer, engineer, mixing
- Brian McKnight – keyboards, producer
- James Moss – producer, engineer, rap, mixing
- J. Valentine – background vocals, writer, producer
- Rami – producer, engineer, mixing
- Wade Robson – arranger, multi instruments, producer
- Jake Schulze – producer, engineer, mixing
- Robin Wiley – producer, digital editing, string arrangements

Technical

- Alan Armitage – engineer
- Brady Barnett – digital editing
- Stuart Brawley – engineer, mixing
- Christopher Carroll – mixing
- Bradley Daymond – mixing
- Todd Fairall – engineer
- Farah Fima – second engineer
- Tony Flores – mixing
- Michael Forbes – engineer
- Brian Garten – engineer
- Alexander Greggs – mixing
- Paul Gregory – engineer
- Kevin Guarnieri – engineer, digital editing, assistant engineer
- Chris Haggerty – digital editing
- Chaz Harper – mastering
- Jean-Marie Horvat – mixing
- Bill Importico – engineer
- Joel Kazmi – engineer, assistant vocal engineer
- Scott Kieklak – mixing
- Peter Mokran – mixing
- Dylan Koski-Budabin – engineer
- Pablo Munguia – engineer, assistant engineer
- Paulino Oliveira – assistant engineer
- John O'Mahoney – mixing
- Charles Pollard – programming, engineer, string arrangements
- Talley Sherwood – engineer
- Mary Ann Souza – assistant engineer
- Rich Tapper – assistant engineer, mixing
- Jim Tobin – FOH Manager
- Michael Tucker – engineer, assistant engineer, mixing, vocal recording
- Carlos Vazquez – beat programming
- Chris Wood – engineer

Other

- Steven Gerstein – stylist
- Jackie Murphy – art direction, design
- Frankie Payne – hair stylist
- Mark Seliger – photography

== Charts ==
=== Weekly charts ===
Weekly chart performance for Celebrity
Chart (2001)	Peak position
Australian Albums (ARIA)	10
Austrian Albums (Ö3 Austria)	24
Belgian Albums (Ultratop Flanders)	31
Belgian Albums (Ultratop Wallonia)	47
Canadian Albums (Billboard)	1
Danish Albums (Hitlisten)	7
Dutch Albums (Album Top 100)	42
European Albums Chart	12
German Albums (Offizielle Top 100)	5
Hungarian Albums (MAHASZ)	25
Icelandic Albums (Tónlist)	5
Irish Albums (IRMA)	25
Italian Albums (FIMI)	54
Japanese Albums (Oricon)	11
Malaysian Albums (IFPI)	1
New Zealand Albums (RMNZ)	10
Norwegian Albums (VG-lista)	16
Scottish Albums (OCC)	15
South African Albums (RISA)	9
Spanish Albums (Promusicae)	21
Swedish Albums (Sverigetopplistan)	27
Swiss Albums (Schweizer Hitparade)	14
UK Albums (OCC)	12
UK Independent Albums (OCC)	2
US Billboard 200	1

=== Year-end charts ===
Year-end chart performance for Celebrity in 2001
Chart (2001)	Position
Canadian Albums (Nielsen SoundScan)	20
US Billboard 200	9

Year-end chart performance for Celebrity in 2002
Chart (2002)	Position
US Billboard 200	54

=== Decade-end charts ===
Decade-end chart performance for Celebrity from 2000 to 2009
Chart (2000–2009)	Position
US Billboard 200	42

== Certifications ==
Certifications and sales for Celebrity
Region	Certification	Certified units/sales
Australia (ARIA)	Gold	35,000^{^}
Brazil (Pro-Música Brasil)	Gold	50,000^{*}
Canada (Music Canada)	2× Platinum	200,000^{^}
South Africa (RISA)	2× Platinum	100,000^{*}
United Kingdom (BPI)	Gold	100,000^{^}
United States (RIAA)	5× Platinum	5,828,000 (Note: As of March 2015, the album has sold 5,002,000 copies in the United States according to Nielsen SoundScan, which does not count albums sold through clubs like the BMG Music Club, where it sold 826,000 units as of February 2003. Combined, it has sold over 5,828,000 copies in the US.)
^{*} Sales figures based on certification alone.^{^} Shipments figures based on certification alone.

== Release history ==
Release dates and formats for Celebrity
Country	Date	Format(s)	Label	Ref.
Japan	July 18, 2001	CD	Sony	
United Kingdom	July 23, 2001	Cassette; CD	RCA	
Canada	July 24, 2001	CD	Sony	
United States	July 24, 2001	Cassette; CD	Jive	
United Kingdom	April 29, 2002	CD (special edition)	RCA	
Japan	August 7, 2002	CD (reissue)	Sony	
Japan	June 20, 2007	CD (reissue)	Sony	

== See also ==
- List of 2001 albums
- List of Billboard 200 number-one albums of 2001
- List of fastest-selling albums worldwide
