= Wade Robson =

Australian dancer and choreographer (born 1982)

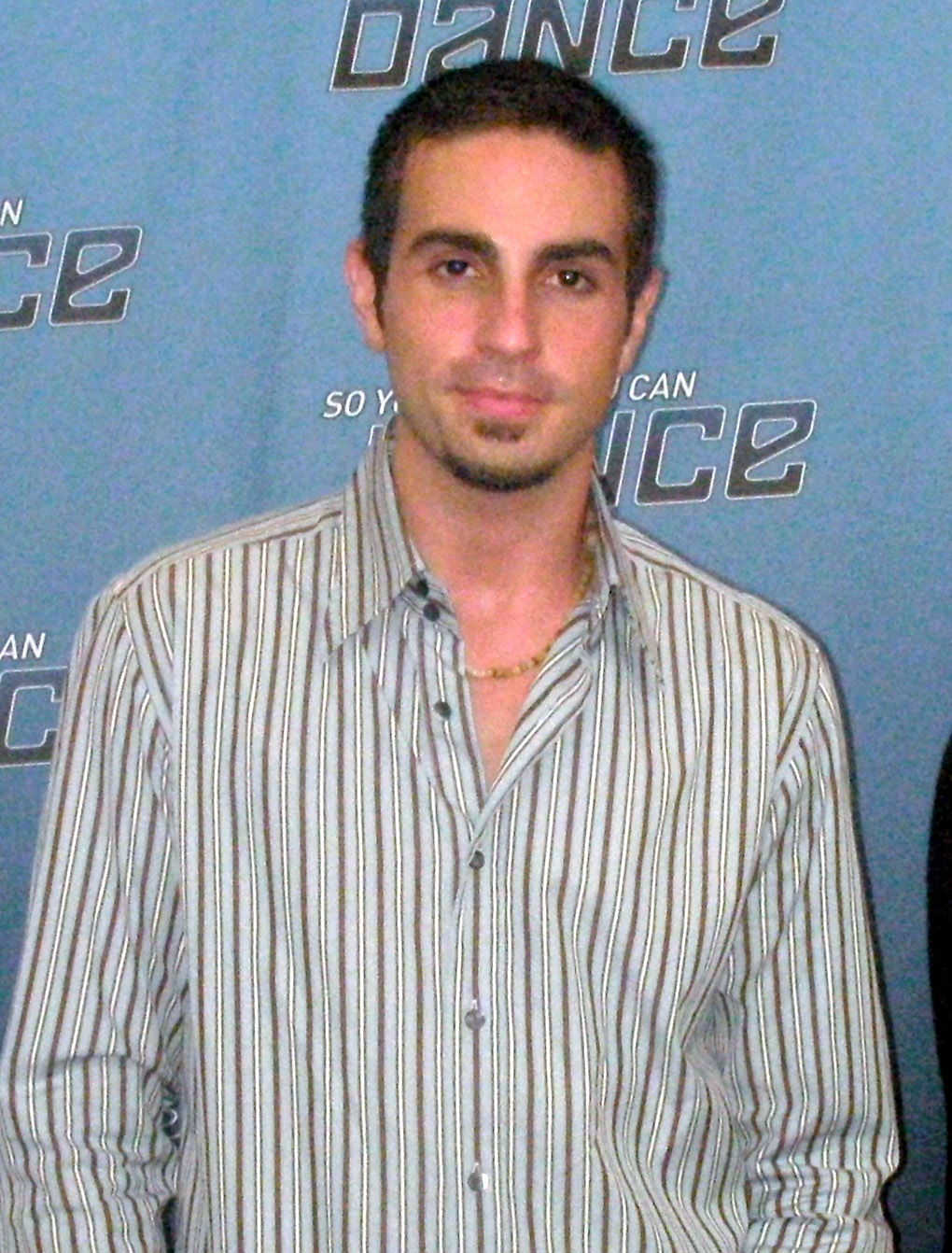
- Robson in 2008
- Born: 17 September 1982 (age 44); Brisbane, Queensland, Australia
- Occupations: Dancer; choreographer; songwriter; musician
- Years active: 1989–present
- Spouse: Amanda Rodriguez (m. 2005)
- Children: 1
- Awards: Primetime Emmy Award 2007, 2008 Outstanding Choreography; 2007 So You Think You Can Dance; Outstanding Choreography; 2008 So You Think You Can Dance
- Musical career
- Genres: Hip hop; dance
- Label: Wade Robson Creations
- Website: waderobsoncreations.com

Wade Jeremy William Robson (born 17 September 1982) is an Australian dancer and choreographer. He began performing as a dancer at age five, and has directed music videos and world tours for pop acts such as NSYNC and Britney Spears. Robson was the host and executive producer of The Wade Robson Project, which aired on MTV in 2003. In 2007, he joined the Fox television dance series So You Think You Can Dance as a guest judge and choreographer. He won a Primetime Emmy Award for Outstanding Choreography for the dance number "Ramalama (Bang Bang)" of So You Think You Can Dance.

When Robson was a child, he was befriended by the pop singer Michael Jackson. In 1993, when Jackson was first accused of child sexual abuse, Robson, aged 10, told police that nothing sexual had happened between them. In 2005, during Jackson's trial, Robson, aged 22, stated under oath that Jackson had never behaved inappropriately. However, in 2013, Robson reversed his position and filed a late creditor claim and a civil lawsuit against the Jackson estate, saying that Jackson had abused him from 1990 to 1997, when Robson was aged between 7 and 14. His case is currently before a California court as Robson v. MJJ Productions. He detailed his allegations in the 2019 documentary Leaving Neverland.

== Career ==
=== Early career ===
Robson was in a talent troupe called Johnny Young's Talent School, and the group did 14 shows a week, usually at venues like shopping malls. When he was nine, Robson moved to the United States with his mother and sister. Michael Jackson assisted them in the move and recruited Robson to appear in three music videos: "Black or White", "Jam", and "Heal the World".

At the age of 11, Robson had an agent. Along with friend DeWayne Turrentine, he formed the hip-hop duo Quo and by the end of the year released an album on Jackson's MJJ Music label through Epic/SME Records. The following year, he was teaching dance classes in Hollywood. He formed a troupe of dancing children, which performed internationally. He received his first choreography job for the R&B group Immature at 14. The job led to others for artists such as Britney Spears. Clients were sometimes reluctant to take direction from Robson, a self-described "skinny little white kid". When Spears first interviewed Robson to choreograph her tour, she exclaimed, "He's a friggin' baby!"; she had expected him to be in his 30s or 40s.

During the late 1990s, while still a teenager, Robson choreographed Spears's Pepsi commercials, including one which aired during Super Bowl 35. He choreographed the performance by NSYNC and Spears at the 1999 MTV Video Music Awards and he co-directed Spears's 1999–2000 world tours as well as NSYNC's 2000 No Strings Attached Tour. In 2001, he choreographed Spears' I'm a Slave 4 U video and was choreographer and director of NSYNC's 2001 PopOdyssey Tour. In the NSYNC music video "Pop", Robson had to fill in for NSYNC member Joey Fatone during several of the dance sequences because of an injury that Fatone sustained at an NSYNC concert rehearsal the night before the video shoot. That same year, he directed Spears's Dream Within a Dream Tour.

Robson and NSYNC's Justin Timberlake partnered in 2001, co-writing the hit singles "Pop", "Gone", and "See Right Through You" on NSYNC's final album Celebrity. Robson had initially written "Celebrity" for his own album, but was persuaded to let NSYNC record it instead. They also co-wrote Britney Spears' "What It's Like to Be Me", on which Timberlake sang backing vocals. The song's copyright is held jointly by Robson's and Timberlake's respective companies, WaJeRo Sound and Tennman Tunes. In 2001, Teen People magazine included him on its list of "One of 20 Teens Who Would Change the World".

=== Professional career ===
Robson was the creator and host of MTV's The Wade Robson Project, a talent search competition for hip-hop dancers. The program was sponsored by Juice Batteries. In 2002, Robson was named one of Dance Magazine's "25 to Watch".

Dance clothing company Power T Dance developed a line of name-brand consumer dance shoes with Robson. The shoes were distributed in the U.S. through the Ralph Libonati Co. Robson appeared as himself in the 2004 urban dance film You Got Served, which won Best Dance Sequence (Feature Film) at the 2004 American Choreography Awards. Robson joined several other choreographers, such as Mia Michaels and Shane Sparks, on the PULSE Tour, a series of nationwide weekend workshops designed to give dancers the chance to train under top choreographers.

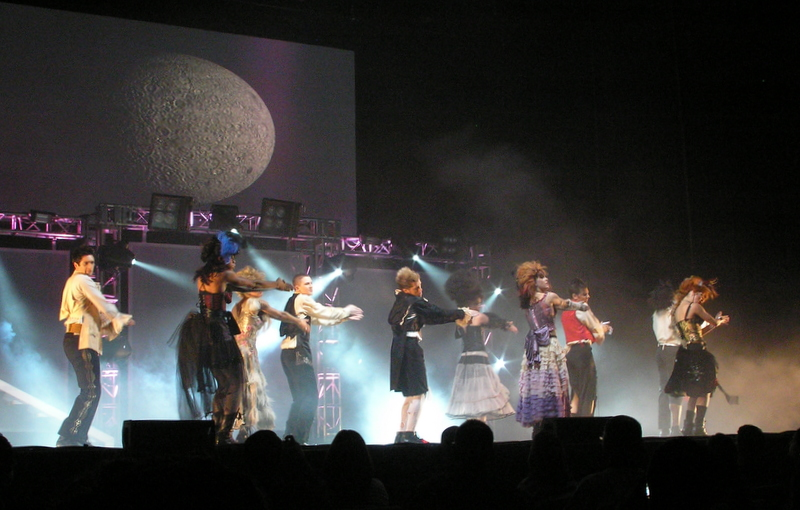
Dancers from So You Think You Can Dance (American TV series) season 2 performing the Zombie dance or the "Ramalama (Bang Bang)" which won Wade his first Emmy in 2007

In 2007, Robson began choreographing the American Idols LIVE! Tour. He also choreographed both group and partner pieces for the second and third seasons of So You Think You Can Dance. In September 2007, Robson was awarded a Primetime Emmy Award for Outstanding Choreography for the dance number "Ramalama (Bang Bang)" on Season 2 of So You Think You Can Dance.

Robson was awarded his second Primetime Emmy Award in 2008 on Season 3 of So You Think You Can Dance for the jazz routine "Humming Bird and the Flower". The show's executive producer Nigel Lythgoe called it "absolutely genius, brilliant, and one of those routines that we will remember on this series for a very long time".

Robson said he and his wife Amanda were hired by singer Britney Spears to direct and choreograph her tour The Circus Starring Britney Spears. Rehearsals were set to begin in January 2009. Robson and his wife were replaced by Jamie King. Spears's team said that Robson had only been hired to choreograph the promotional tour for her album 2008 Circus, which ended in Japan in December 2008.

Robson choreographed the animated film Happy Feet Two, released in 2011. He was set to direct Step Up Revolution (released in 2012), but dropped out for personal reasons. He was replaced by Scott Speer.

== Michael Jackson ==
When Robson was five, he met the American singer Michael Jackson, who was touring Australia. Two years later, when Robson visited the US with his family to perform with Johnny Young's Talent School in Disneyland, California, Jackson invited the family to stay with him at his home, Neverland Ranch, also in California. Robson appeared in Jackson's music videos.

In 2005, after Jackson was charged with child sexual abuse, Robson testified in his defense, saying he had slept in Jackson's bedroom several times but had never been molested. Jackson was acquitted. After Jackson's death in 2009, Robson said: "His music, his movement, his personal words of inspiration and encouragement and his unconditional love will live inside of me forever."

In 2013, Robson reversed his position and filed a lawsuit against Jackson's estate. He said that Jackson had sexually abused him on two visits to the US and after he moved with his family to the US, when Robson was aged between seven and 14. Robson said his earlier denial was due to Jackson's "complete manipulation and brainwashing", and that his change of story was provoked by becoming a father and experiencing nervous breakdowns. The allegations by Robson and another man, James Safechuck, are the focus of the 2019 documentary Leaving Neverland.

In 2017, Robson's lawsuit was dismissed as the statute of limitations had expired. It was revived in 2019 after a new law gave those who allege childhood sexual abuse longer to file lawsuits. The case was dismissed again in April 2021, when a judge ruled that Jackson's companies had no legal duty to protect Robson. This ruling was overturned in August 2023 in a decision in Safechuck v. MJJ Productions, clearing the way for a trial.

== Personal life ==
Robson dated Michael Jackson's niece Brandi, the daughter of Jackie Jackson, for seven years. Brandi stated in Neverland Firsthand: Investigating the Michael Jackson Documentary, a documentary made in response to Leaving Neverland, that she and Robson met as children during a photoshoot with Michael Jackson. Robson asked Jackson to set the two up. The two were friends for ten years prior to the beginning of their relationship. Brandi also said that Robson cheated on her with Britney Spears during Spears' 1999–2001 tour, ending the pair's relationship as well as the relationship between Spears and Justin Timberlake. This implies that Timberlake wrote "Cry Me a River" about Spears cheating on him with Robson. Spears confirmed that her affair with Robson did happen, but Timberlake has not commented on these rumours. Robson also dated dancer Mayte Garcia from 2000 until 2001. Robson married Amanda Rodriguez in August 2005. They had a son in 2010.

== See also ==
- List of dancers
