= A Very Boy Band Holiday =

2021 American television special

- Country of origin: United States
- Original language: English

Production
- Executive producers: David Chamberlin; Michael Antinoro; Joe Mulvihill; Chris Wagner; Helen Bromfield
- Production location: Virtual
- Production company: 45 Live

Original release
- Network: ABC
- Release: December 6, 2021

A Very Boy Band Holiday is an American television Christmas special, which aired on ABC on December 6, 2021. The program featured musical performances of holiday songs by people from the boy band groups: NSYNC (Joey Fatone, Chris Kirkpatrick, Lance Bass), Boyz II Men (Wanya Morris, Shawn Stockman), New Edition (Bobby Brown, Michael Bivins), New Kids on the Block (Joey McIntyre), O-Town (Erik-Michael Estrada) and 98 Degrees (Nick Lachey, Drew Lachey, Jeff Timmons, Justin Jeffre).

== Performances ==
Performers & Songs featured on A Very Boy Band Holiday
Artist(s)	Song(s)
Joey Fatone; Wanya Morris	"A Very Boy Band Holiday"
Joey Fatone; Chris Kirkpatrick	"Rockin' Around the Christmas Tree"
Drew Lachey; Jeff Timmons; Justin Jeffre; Nick Lachey	"This Gift"
Bobby Brown; Shawn Stockman; Wanya Morris; Michael Bivins	"Give Love on Christmas Day"
Joey McIntyre featuring Griffin McIntyre	"This One's for the Children"
Wanya Morris	"I Saw Mommy Kissing Santa Claus"
Wanya Morris; Shawn Stockman	"Let It Snow"
Joey Fatone; Chris Kirkpatrick; Drew Lachey; Jeff Timmons; Justin Jeffre; Erik-Michael Estrada	"Merry Christmas, Happy Holidays"
Bobby Brown; Shawn Stockman; Drew Lachey; Erik-Michael Estrada; Jeff Timmons; Justin Jeffre; Joey Fatone; Chris Kirkpatrick; Wanya Morris	"This Christmas"

== Appearances ==
- Melanie C
