= Something Like You =

Song by NSYNC

from the album Celebrity
- Released: July 24, 2001
- Genre: Pop; R&B
- Length: 4:14
- Songwriter(s): Justin Timberlake; Robbie Buchanan; Robin Wiley; Jay Landers
- Producer(s): Justin Timberlake; Robbie Buchanan; Robin Wiley

"Something Like You" is a 2001 song by NSYNC, co-produced and co-written by Justin Timberlake and group vocal coach Robin Wiley for the album Celebrity.

== Production ==
"I said, 'We have to get him to do it.' I mean, that's the other thing that he's famous for — besides his incredible voice, he's killer on the harp. Somehow the record company got a hold of him and it just worked out. He came in and it definitely was a surreal moment. I was sitting at the board, and he's sitting in the booth playing the part."

— Timberlake on enlisting Wonder, via MTV.com

Stevie Wonder played harmonica on the track. Timberlake and Wiley enlisted Wonder after writing the harmonica part. While recording, Timberlake informed Wonder that he was playing the final note flat.

== Critical reception ==
Entertainment Weekly wrote the song was a "the squishy ballad with drooling-puppy harmonies and lyrics", and gave it a D-rating. Variety deemed it "so-so". Billboard felt the "slushy" song had an "eyeroll-worthy lyric" and "corny harmonica riff", though positively compared it to the Boyz II Men hit "4 Seasons of Loneliness". ABC suggested that Wonder was actively choosing to contribute to "studio-produced pop" whereas other may have declined. Slant Magazine felt that in comparison with Boyz II Men, the song was "watered-down pop than classic soul", and a sign of the "classic hit-making formula" of old rather than the new experimental pop direction the band was exploring.
