= Gone (NSYNC song) =

2001 single by NSYNC

Single by NSYNC

from the album Celebrity
- B-side: "I'll Be Good for You"; "The Game Is Over"
- Released: August 21, 2001
- Recorded: 2001
- Studio: Westlake Recording (Los Angeles)
- Genre: Pop; R&B; soul
- Length: 4:51
- Label: Jive
- Songwriters: Justin Timberlake; Wade Robson
- Producers: Justin Timberlake; Wade Robson

NSYNC singles chronology
"Pop" (2001)	"Gone" (2001)	"Girlfriend" (2002)

Music video
- "Gone" on YouTube

"Gone" is a song by American boy band NSYNC. It was released as the second single from their fourth studio album, Celebrity (2001). The band first performed the song on PopOdyssey during mid-2001, and it was sent to US radio on August 21, 2001. The physical release of the single did not occur until October 15, 2001, when a CD single was issued in Australia. It is the first NSYNC single where Justin Timberlake sings all lead vocals.

The song was nominated at the 44th Annual Grammy Awards for Best Pop Performance by a Duo or Group with Vocals, but lost to U2's "Stuck in a Moment You Can't Get Out Of".

== Background and composition ==
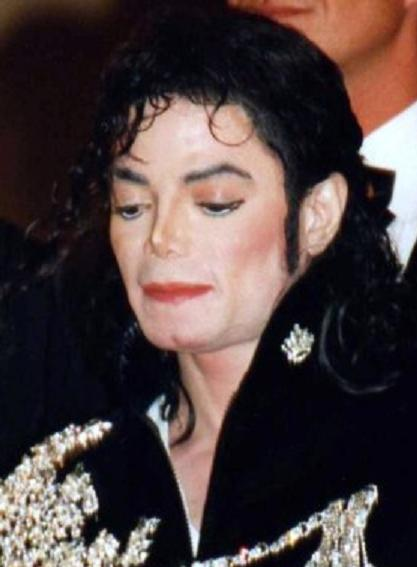
The song was initially intended for Michael Jackson

"Gone" was initially written by Justin Timberlake and Wade Robson for Michael Jackson in 2001. However, Jackson declined the song, which allowed Timberlake to introduce it in an A&R meeting for NSYNC's 2001 album, Celebrity. It was the first song Timberlake sold on his own, as he brought it to the group to record together. Jackson eventually changed his mind and requested to be featured on the song as a duet; however, the song was already released, and the two could not find a way to revamp it. In an interview with Oprah Winfrey, Timberlake expressed, "[Michael] was very absolute about the fact that he wanted it to be a duet between himself and I."

In an interview with Billboard, JC Chasez described the song's significance on the group: "['Gone'] is about as raw as it gets. It's just us and a beat-box, with just a tiny accent of acoustic guitar and violin. That song is a proud moment for us; it really shows how tight we are as a group."

Timberlake wrote the song after an idea came when his then-girlfriend Britney Spears went to the hair salon and did not return for hours. The song and music video were notable departures for the group, as previous NSYNC singles had verses divided between lead vocalists Timberlake and Chasez, and in earlier music videos each group member had a storyline. "Gone" has Timberlake singing both verses as well as the bridge, runs, and ad libs. He is also the focus of the accompanying music video, with Timberlake getting mostly solo footage while his bandmates appear together separately.

The song is set in the key of C major and C minor (recorded in B major and B minor) at 56 bpm.

== Critical reception ==
Jason Lipshutz of Billboard stated that the song established "Timberlake as a solo artist long before he was actually a solo artist, and remains one of his very best singles to date." In 2018, Billboard staff ranked the song 24 on their list "The 100 Greatest Boy band Songs of All Time," writing, "the bridge is downright surreal, as the sparse beat drops out entirely, the meter all but dissolves, and the five members sound like they're swarming Timberlake's subconscious, until he breaks out for a final chorus of masterful ad libs. But it all comes back to that one word: harrowing, relentless and unmistakably final." In 2015, Rolling Stone staff ranked it as the 37th greatest boy band song of all time.

== Chart performance ==
"Gone" peaked at number eleven on the Billboard Hot 100 on November 13, 2001. It also reached number fourteen on the Hip Hop/R&B Airplay charts, becoming the only pop boy band to chart there. The single also hit number 27 on the Adult Contemporary chart. It also reached number 28 in Canada, number 24 in the UK, and number 43 in Sweden.

== Music video ==
The music video for "Gone" was directed by Herb Ritts and filmed in August 2001. It debuted on TRL on September 26, 2001. The video is shot in black-and-white, but opens and closes with sepia-toned scenes of a silent film depicting Timberlake as a Charlie Chaplin-esque figure who tries to woo his love interest. The main part of the video depicts Timberlake singing in an empty house with his bandmates. Scenes of the group singing are intercut with Timberlake's flashbacks to happier times with a former girlfriend, played by Croatian model Korina Longin. These flashbacks include Timberlake celebrating his girlfriend's birthday at a party with NSYNC, painting his girlfriend's toenails, gifting her a necklace, and rolling around in the grass kissing.

"Gone" was the first NSYNC video to center on Timberlake, with Jon O'Brien of Billboard writing, "Herb Ritts' brooding monochrome promo highlighted even further how much Timberlake had outgrown his bandmates." As Timberlake would go on to launch a successful solo career the following year, writers have noted the music video foreshadowed the band's future and Timberlake's solo ascent. The video became *NSYNC's tenth number 1 video for Total Request Live. The video received spins on BET's 106 & Park, making NSYNC the only all-white group to ever get rotation on the show. "Gone" was nominated for Video of the Year at the 2002 MTV Video Music Awards, but lost to "Without Me" by Eminem.

== Live performances ==
"Gone" was performed live at the 2001 Billboard Music Awards, the 2002 Grammy Awards, and during the band's set at a 2002 Winter Olympics concert, in addition to the group's PopOdyssey and Celebrity tour shows. Justin Timberlake has also sung the song solo on his Justified Tour and The 20/20 Experience World Tour. The group sang the opening bars of "Gone" at the beginning of their reunion medley at the 2013 MTV Video Music Awards where Timberlake was awarded the Michael Jackson Video Vanguard Award.

== Track listing ==
European maxi single
No.	Title	Length
1.	"Gone" (Radio Edit)	4:22
2.	"Gone" (Spanish Radio Edit)	4:22
3.	"Gone" (Album Version)	4:51
4.	"I'll Be Good for You"	3:56

Japanese maxi single
No.	Title	Length
1.	"Gone" (Radio Edit)	4:22
2.	"Gone" (Album Version)	4:51
3.	"I'll Be Good for You"	3:56
4.	"Pop" (Databass Remix)	5:32

UK maxi single
No.	Title	Length
1.	"Gone" (Radio Edit)	4:22
2.	"I'll Be Good for You"	3:56
3.	"Pop" (Pablo La Rosa's Funktified Mix)	5:38

European Gone Clubbin version
No.	Title	Length
1.	"Gone" (Gone Clubbin' I'll Be Back Late Mix)	5:57
2.	"Gone" (Radio Edit)	4:22
3.	"The Game Is Over"	3:25

Australian Gone Clubbin version
No.	Title	Length
1.	"Gone" (Gone Clubbin' – I'll Be Back Late Mix)	5:57
2.	"Gone" (Gone Clubbin' – I'll Be Back Late Radio Edit)	3:57
3.	"Gone" (Radio Edit)	4:22
4.	"Gone" (Spanish Version)	4:22
5.	"Girlfriend" (The Neptunes Remix)	4:43

== Credits and personnel ==
Recording

- Recorded at Westlake Recording Studios, Los Angeles, CA

Personnel

- Justin Timberlake – songwriter, producer, arranger, multi instruments
- Wade J. Robson – songwriter, producer, arranger, multi instruments
- Alan Armitage – recording
- Kevin Guarnieri – assistant recording engineer
- Peter Mokran – mixing
- Tony Flores – assistant mixing engineer
- Chris Haggerty – digital editing
- Robin Wiley – string arrangement
- Yasu – strings recording
- Jeremy Welch – assistant strings recording engineer
- The Hampton String Quartet – strings performer
- Michael Thompson – guitars
- Michael A. Lang – piano

== Charts ==
=== Weekly charts ===
Chart (2001–2002)	Peak position
Australia (ARIA)	67
Belgium (Ultratip Bubbling Under Flanders)	17
Canada (Nielsen SoundScan)	28
Europe (Eurochart Hot 100)	73
Germany (GfK)	62
Ireland (IRMA)	40
Netherlands (Dutch Top 40 Tipparade)	11
Scotland Singles (OCC)	36
Spain Airplay (Top 40 Radio)	22
Switzerland (Schweizer Hitparade)	85
Sweden (Sverigetopplistan)	43
UK Singles (OCC)	24
UK Indie (OCC)	3
US Billboard Hot 100	11
US Adult Contemporary (Billboard)	27
US Hot R&B/Hip-Hop Songs (Billboard)	14
US Pop Airplay (Billboard)	7
US Rhythmic Airplay (Billboard)	17

=== Year-end charts ===
Chart (2001)	Position
US Mainstream Top 40 (Billboard)	61

Chart (2002)	Position
US Billboard Hot 100	75
US Hot R&B/Hip-Hop Singles & Tracks (Billboard)	75
US Mainstream Top 40 (Billboard)	59
US Rhythmic Top 40 (Billboard)	80

== Release history ==
Country	Date	Format(s)	Label	Ref.
United States	August 21, 2001	Contemporary hit radio	Jive	
Australia	October 15, 2001	CD	Jive	
Japan	October 24, 2001	Maxi-CD	Jive	
Austria	November 5, 2001	Maxi-CD	Jive	
Germany	November 5, 2001	Maxi-CD	Jive	
Switzerland	November 5, 2001	Maxi-CD	Jive	
United Kingdom	November 26, 2001	CD; cassette	Jive	
