= Broken Promises: Caste, Crime and Politics in Bihar =

2024 book by Mrityunjay Sharma

- Author: Mrityunjay Sharma
- Language: English
- Genre: History, Bihar, Politics
- Publisher: Westland Books
- Publication date: 2024
- Publication place: India
- ISBN: 9789360455224

Broken Promises: Caste, Crime and Politics in Bihar is a book written by Mrityunjay Sharma, an entrepreneur, politician and social activist who grown up in Ranchi, then in undivided Bihar. It is published by Westland Non-Fiction Publications in 2024. The book is divided into seven parts, and it tells a tale of the ills that befell the State with the rise of Lalu Prasad Yadav, former Chief minister of Bihar in the politics of Bihar from scams, criminalisation, caste wars, misgovernance, to policy paralysis.

== Reception ==
The book was launched in Delhi at the Constitution Club of India on 19 March 2024 in presence of Pavan Varma, former diplomat and former advisor to Nitish Kumar, and Advaita Kala, a columnist and author.

It was launched in Ranchi at the Audrey House on 29 April 2024 in the presence of Harivansh Narayan Singh, Babulal Marandi and Ashok Bhagat.

The book was featured in the March Non-Fiction of Scroll.in in March 2024.

The book was featured in the Sahitya Tak Book Cafe Top 10 Books of 2024 in the political books category.

== Reviews ==
The book has been reviewed by The Times of India, Supriy Ranjan of The Frontline, Syed Saad Ahmed of Hindustan Times, Aditya Mani Jha of The Federal News, Aditi Phadnis of Business Standard, Amitabh Ranjan of Financial Express and Swapna Peri of Storizen.

Syed Saad Ahmed of Hindustan Times writes,

"While Broken Promises explores some of the historical reasons for why Bihar lagged behind the rest of India, it focuses primarily on how the rule of Lalu Prasad Yadav and his wife Rabri Devi affected the state. It also traces Yadav's ascendancy against the major political events of the 1990s, such as the Mandal Commission's recommendations for caste-based affirmative action and LK Advani's procession to build a Ram temple at Ayodhya."
