= WOM magazin =

Defunct German music magazine

WOM magazin was a freely distributed German music magazine. The magazine was founded in Kiel in 1982. It was discontinued in 2009, with the double December 2008/January 2009 issue being the last one.

The magazine is replaced with the online version "WOM World of Music", a division of jpc-schallplatten Versandhandelsgesellschaft mbH, available in English and German.
