= Girlfriend (NSYNC song) =

2002 single by NSYNC

Single by NSYNC

from the album Celebrity
- B-side: "The Two of Us"
- Released: January 14, 2002
- Recorded: April–May 2001
- Studio: Right Track, Battery (New York City); Wire (Orlando, Florida)
- Genre: Pop; hip-hop; R&B
- Length: 4:14 (album version); 4:45 (The Neptunes remix)
- Label: Jive
- Songwriters: Chad Hugo; Justin Timberlake; Pharrell Williams; Cornell Haynes (remix)
- Producer: The Neptunes

NSYNC singles chronology
"Gone" (2001)	"Girlfriend" (2002)	"Better Place" (2023)

Nelly singles chronology
"#1" (2001)	"Girlfriend" (remix) (2002)	"Hot in Herre" (2002)

Music video
- "Girlfriend" on YouTube

"Girlfriend" is a song by the American boy band NSYNC featuring Nelly. It was released on January 14, 2002, as the third single from NSYNC's fourth album, Celebrity. It was the group's last song to enter the top 10 of the US Billboard Hot 100, peaking at number five. "Girlfriend" reached number one in Canada and charted within the top 10 in six other countries, including Australia, Germany, and the United Kingdom. This was the last single and song the band released in their career before their reunion in 2023.

== Background ==
When originally announced as a single, the intention was for the album version from Celebrity of the track "Girlfriend" to be released along with a video and released to television. However, just weeks before the release, NSYNC announced that the Neptunes would remix the song for its single release and feature two all-new verses with rapper Nelly. When Nelly was approached to record the song, he was initially met with resistance from his record label Universal Records, who stated that he was trying to "ruin [his] career". Nelly insisted on appearing on the song, which they eventually conceded. It was his first major cross-collaboration.

The song contained a hip-hop influence and was sent to Top 40 and Hot AC radio in January 2002 before being released commercially on March 12, 2002, as an enhanced CD.

== Critical reception ==
In 2015, Billboard's Jason Lipshutz ranked it tenth on the list "Top 20 Essential Boy Band Songs," writing, "straddling the lines of pop, R&B and hip-hop, the song could have been the precursor to the boy band's stylistic shift, but instead proved to be the starting point for Justin Timberlake's solo career."

== Music video ==
=== Background ===
Two music videos exist for the single, which were both directed by Marc Klasfeld. The first video was released in late December 2001, while the Neptunes Remix debuted on March 12, 2002.

=== Synopsis ===
The music video featured the band dancing on cars, singing to girls and a drag race, which was won by Justin Timberlake. The Neptunes Remix featured scenes of Nelly spliced between shots of the pre-existing video. He is shown rapping next to Timberlake during both of his rap verses, as well as interacting with female models in the backseat of the car throughout this version of the video. Scenes of Timberlake initiating the drag race in the interlude, which is shown in the original video, are omitted in the remix to accommodate Nelly.

== Track listings ==
US and Canadian CD single

1. "Girlfriend" (album version) – 4:13
2. "Girlfriend" (the Neptunes remix featuring Nelly) – 4:43
3. "Gone" (Gone Clubbin' "I'll Be Back Late" mix) – 5:57
4. "Gone" (Spanish version) – 4:51
5. "Girlfriend" (video)

US 12-inch single

A1. "Girlfriend" (the Neptunes remix featuring Nelly) – 4:43
A2. "Girlfriend" (the Neptunes remix instrumental) – 4:43
B1. "Girlfriend" (album version) – 4:13
B2. "Gone" (Gone Clubbin' "I'll Be Back Late" mix) – 5:57

UK CD and cassette single

1. "Girlfriend" (the Neptunes remix featuring Nelly)
2. "The Two of Us"
3. "Gone" (Gone Clubbin' radio edit)

European CD single

1. "Girlfriend" (the Neptunes remix featuring Nelly) – 4:43
2. "Girlfriend" (album version) – 4:13

Australian CD single

1. "Girlfriend" (the Neptunes remix featuring Nelly) – 4:45
2. "Girlfriend" (album version) – 4:14
3. "Gone" (Gone Clubbin' "I'll Be Late" mix) – 5:59
4. "Girlfriend" (video)

Japanese CD single

1. "Girlfriend" (album version) – 4:13
2. "Girlfriend" (instrumental) – 4:12
3. "Gone" (Gone Clubbin' "I'll Be Late" mix) – 5:58

== Credits and personnel ==
Credits are from the UK CD single liner notes.

Recording

- Recorded at Right Track, Battery Studios (New York City), and WIRE Studios (Orlando, Florida)

Personnel

- Justin Timberlake – songwriting
- Chad Hugo – songwriting, production, remix production
- Pharrell Williams – songwriting, production, remix producing
- The Neptunes – producing, remix producing
- Brian Garten – recording, additional vocal recording
- Paul Gregory – assistant recording engineer
- Rowie Nameri – assistant recording engineer
- Matina Scarpino – assistant recording engineer
- Jean-Marie Horvat – mixing
- Josean Possey – assistant mixing engineer
- Chaz Harper – mastering

== Charts ==
=== Weekly charts ===
Weekly chart performance for "Girlfriend"
Chart (2002)	Peak position
Australia (ARIA)	2
Australian Urban (ARIA)	1
Austria (Ö3 Austria Top 40)	43
Belgium (Ultratop 50 Flanders)	34
Belgium (Ultratip Bubbling Under Wallonia)	15
Canada (Nielsen SoundScan)	1
Canada CHR (Nielsen BDS)	5
Denmark (Tracklisten)	6
Denmark Airplay (Tracklisten)	15
Europe (Eurochart Hot 100)	4
Europe (European Hit Radio)	26
Germany (GfK)	6
Ireland (IRMA)	8
Netherlands (Dutch Top 40)	10
Netherlands (Single Top 100)	8
New Zealand (Recorded Music NZ)	13
Norway (VG-lista)	12
Romania (Romanian Top 100)	93
Scottish Singles Sales (Official Charts)	5
Spain Airplay (Top 40 Radio)	39
Sweden (Sverigetopplistan)	36
Switzerland (Schweizer Hitparade)	23
UK Singles (Official Charts)	2
UK Airplay (Music Week)	6
UK Indie (Official Charts)	1
UK Hip Hop/R&B (Official Charts)	1
US Billboard Hot 100	5
US Hot R&B/Hip-Hop Songs (Billboard)	23
US Pop Airplay (Billboard)	5
US Rhythmic Airplay (Billboard)	6

=== Year-end charts ===
Year-end performance for "Girlfriend"
Chart (2002)	Position
Australia (ARIA)	26
Australian Urban (ARIA)	8
Brazil (Crowley)	81
Canada (Nielsen SoundScan)	18
Canada Radio (Nielsen BDS)	84
Europe (Eurochart Hot 100)	96
Germany (Media Control)	73
Ireland (IRMA)	69
Netherlands (Dutch Top 40)	77
Netherlands (Single Top 100)	70
UK Singles (OCC)	44
UK Airplay (Music Week)	63
US Billboard Hot 100	33
US Mainstream Top 40 (Billboard)	29
US Rhythmic Top 40 (Billboard)	35

== Certifications ==
Certifications and sales for "Girlfriend"
Region	Certification	Certified units/sales
Australia (ARIA)	Gold	35,000^{^}
New Zealand (RMNZ)	Gold	5,000^{*}
United Kingdom (BPI)	Gold	400,000^{‡}
^{*} Sales figures based on certification alone.^{^} Shipments figures based on certification alone.^{‡} Sales+streaming figures based on certification alone.

== Release history ==
Release dates and formats for "Girlfriend"
Region	Date	Format(s)	Label(s)	Ref.
United States	January 14, 2002	Contemporary hit radio	Jive	
United States	January 21, 2002	Hot adult contemporary radio	Jive	
Japan	January 30, 2002	CD	Jive	
United States	March 12, 2002	Enhanced CD	Jive	
Australia	April 15, 2002	CD	Jive	
United Kingdom	April 15, 2002	CD	Jive	
