= Tonya Mitchell =

American former popstar country pop artist

- Born: Tonya Jean Mitchell
- Origin: Tennessee, United States
- Genres: Pop, country
- Occupations: Singer, actress, model
- Instrument: Singing
- Years active: 1999–2002, 2025-
- Labels: 1999–2001; Universal Records

Tonya Jean Mitchell is an American pop/country singer.

== Biography ==
=== Early life ===
Mitchell was born in Madisonville, Kentucky to "Cowboy" Louie and Paulette Mitchell.

Mitchell grew up in Huron, Tennessee, a small town just north east of Memphis. In 1998, Mitchell was performing country music at a regional benefit for St. Jude's Hospital when Bill Bomar, Justin Timberlake's grandfather, heard the young teen sing. Excited by her voice, Bomar approached Mitchell and told her that Timberlake was his grandson and that he could help her break into the music industry.

Mitchell did not think much about this, but later it led to her signing with Timberlake's management company, JustinTime Entertainment, and being managed by Timberlake's mother, Lynn Harless. Mitchell was later signed to Universal Records and entered the studio to record her twelve-song debut album.

=== "I Represent" ===
On February 27, 2001, a few weeks after recording her album, Mitchell's first single, "Broken Promises", hit the radio stations. The song reached #38 on the Billboard Mainstream Top 40 chart. Mitchell released her debut solo album, "I Represent", on April 10, 2001.

In 2001, Mitchell was asked to be one of the opening acts for the NSYNC Pop Odyssey Tour. This helped her career as she began making appearances at venues and performing in front of large audiences. Mitchell shared the stage with acts that included Nelly, Boyz II Men, Lil Romeo, Dream & Tyrese.

After the tour ended, Mitchell performed at various radio shows throughout the United States, including a performance at the Rock and Roll Hall of Fame.

=== Retirement ===
In July 2001, Mitchell's father, Cowboy Louie Mitchell, died. Following the heartache of losing her father, Mitchell was dropped from Universal Records. She decided to step away from the recording industry to spend time with her family.

In 2002, Mitchell married Jason Essary, a car salesman. They had a daughter named Scarlett in 2004.

=== Restart ===
On 12 December 2025, she released the first single in 24 years, "Nobody Loves Me Like You." Prior to that, the music video world premiered on American Country Network December 1, 2025 where it currently is in permanent rotation.

== Discography ==
=== Albums ===
- I Represent (April 10, 2001)

Track listing

1. I Represent (Brian Kierulf; Josh Schwartz; Nate Butler) - 3:07
2. Broken Promises (Dino Esposito; Scot Rammer) - 3:36
3. Stay (Cheryl Yie; Gen Rubin) - 5:16
4. You're The One I Want (Chris Liggio; Kimberly Leadbetter) - 3:03
5. Place Like This (Greg Charley; Mark Mueller) - 4:35
6. Wasted Breath (Dino Esposito) - 4:08
7. Little Too Late (Brian Kierulf; Josh Schwartz) - 4:02
8. I Don't Wanna Fall In Love (Denise Rich; Gen Rubin) - 4:47
9. Only One (Denise Rich; Gen Rubin) - 3:32
10. Turn Around (Denise Rich; Gen Rubin) - 4:39
11. I Cry Real Tears (Linda Thompson-Jenner; Reed Vertelney) - 4:03
12. Should I Stay (Dave Katz; Steven Wolf) - 4:02

Singles

Release date	Title	Chart positions		Album
Release date	Title	U.S. Top 40	U.S. R&B/Hip-Hop	Album
February 27, 2001	"Broken Promises"	38	5	I Represent
December 12, 2025	"Nobody Loves Me Like You"	-	-	TBA
