= Pop (NSYNC song) =

2001 single by NSYNC

Single by NSYNC

from the album Celebrity
- Released: May 14, 2001
- Studio: Westlake (Los Angeles); Metalworks (Toronto)
- Genre: Dance-pop; electropop
- Length: 3:57 (album version); 2:55 (radio version)
- Label: Jive
- Songwriters: Justin Timberlake; Wade Robson
- Producer: Brian Transeau

NSYNC singles chronology
"This I Promise You" (2000)	"Pop" (2001)	"Gone" (2001)

Music video
- "Pop" on YouTube

"Pop" is a song by American boy band NSYNC. It was released to American radio on May 14, 2001, as the first single from their fourth studio album, Celebrity (2001). The song was written by Wade Robson and Justin Timberlake and produced by BT. It won four 2001 MTV Video Music Awards, for Best Group Video, Best Pop Video, Best Dance Video, and Viewer's Choice, as well as a Teen Choice Award for Choice Single.

== Background and release ==
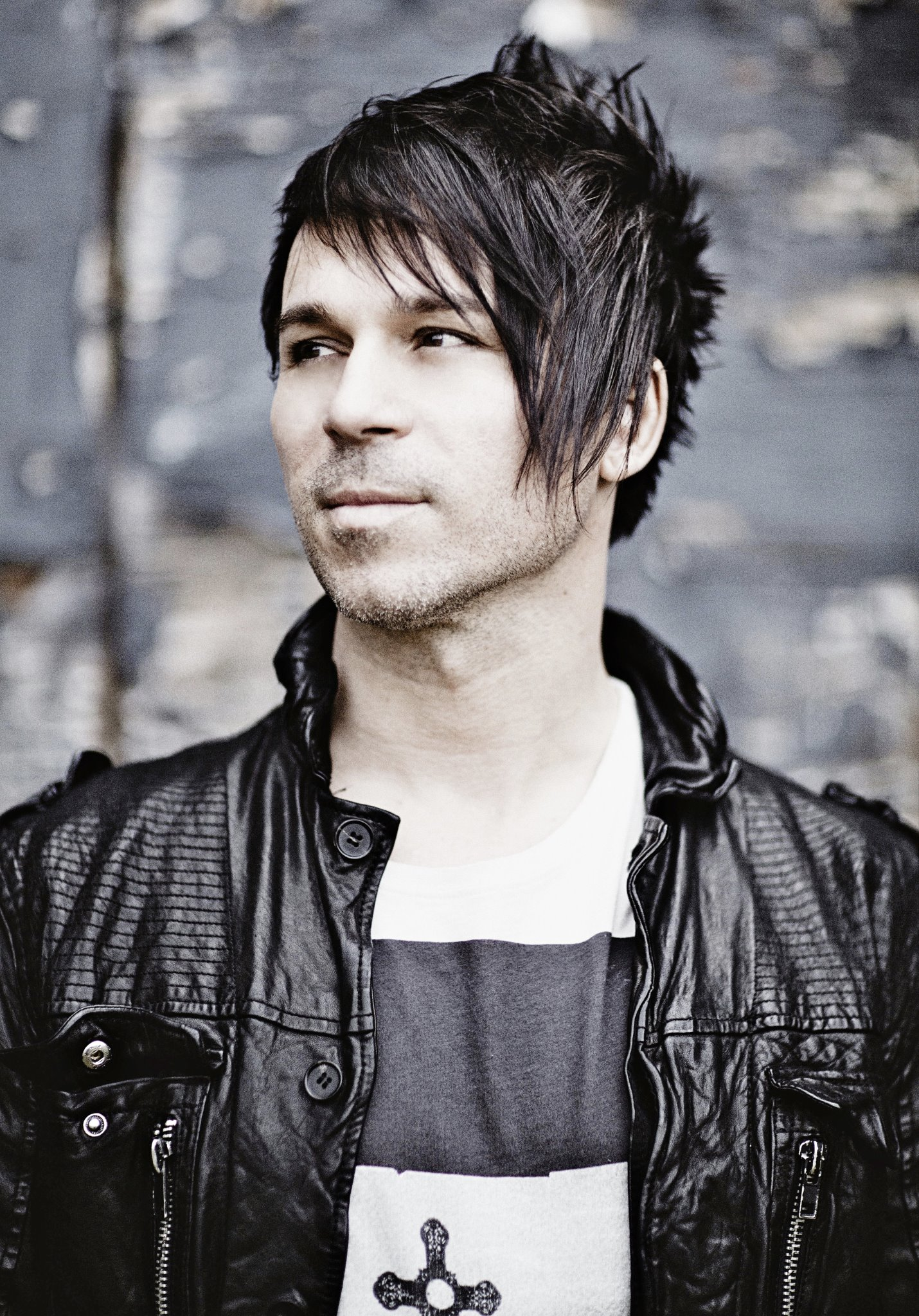
BT was personally asked by Chasez and Timberlake to produce the song.

Despite the success of NSYNC's previous studio album No Strings Attached (2000), the band were constantly blasted by critics who had preconceptions of what a "credible group" was, which forced them to be more involved in the production of their next album, Celebrity. While discussing "Pop" in a 2001 interview with Billboard, Justin Timberlake stated that NSYNC "put everything that is not considered 'pop music' in [the] song".

The group enlisted BT after JC Chasez and Timberlake befriended the musician. Chasez asked BT to appear on NSYNC's next album, but BT was initially hesitant due to his "ambivalence" towards the band. He eventually relented when Timberlake heard BT's song "The Hip Hop Phenomenon", from the UK version of his 1999 album Movement in Still Life, on the request that he "treat [their] vocals so irreverently, it's not even funny". While the song was in production, BT heard Timberlake beatboxing under his breath and asked to use his vocals. Timberlake initially hesitated, as he did not want it to be featured on any track, but relented as BT created four tracks using broken headphones. After BT created over 1,200 edits of the track using Max Headroom-styled stutter-edits, he showed the song to Chasez and Timberlake, who immediately loved it. Jive Records was initially reluctant to release "Pop" as the first single from Celebrity, as they reasoned that the song is "not radio-friendly" and didn’t "have a formula".

On May 11, 2001, MTV broadcast a recording of "Pop" via satellite during NSYNC's tour rehearsal for PopOdyssey, which subsequently led to the song's radio release on May 14, 2001. In the United Kingdom and Australia, it was released on July 9, 2001.

== Composition ==
"Pop" was written by Wade Robson and Timberlake, and produced by BT using his famous "stutter edit" sound. The song contains genre transitions such as turntablism, hair metal and electro-funk. It also includes a "dance-friendly breakdown", and a Timberlake-performed beat-box, which Jon O'Brien of Billboard compared to the sound of a drum machine. BT used a total of 3,642 vocal edits in the song. Sheet music for "Pop" shows the key of C♯ minor with a tempo of 120 beats per minute in 4/4 common time. NSYNC's vocals span from G♯_{3} to G♯_{5}.

== Reception ==
John Hugar of Uproxx opined that "Pop" is "a sort of proto-salvo against in the rockist vs. poptimists argument." Billboard writer Larry Flick described the song as "a crafty, anthemic blend of Cameo-style electro-funk beats, Euro-pop synths, heavy-metal guitars, and Timberlake's now-signature human beat-box riffs."

Commercially, "Pop" peaked at number 19 on the US Billboard Hot 100. In Canada, the domestic physical single peaked at number 16 on the Canadian Singles Chart while an imported format topped the chart for four weeks. Outside North America, it charted within the top 10 in several countries, reaching number seven on the Norwegian VG-lista chart, number nine on the UK Singles Chart, and number 10 on the Australian ARIA Singles Chart.

== Music video ==
=== Background and reception ===
The music video for "Pop" was directed by American director Wayne Isham and filmed in Sony Pictures Studios from May 13 to 15, 2001. Three sets were built: an apartment shot as the opening scene, a multi-storey club, and a green screen where the band performed the song's dance choreography, aided with several computer-generated imagery (CGI) sequences. A 35-foot-tall stage was built with a 40-foot ramp, where the dancers were harnessed to the ceiling. Two days before filming, Joey Fatone injured his leg while rehearsing for the PopOdyssey tour in New Orleans, as the area between his knee and calf was trapped between a 300 pound platform underneath the stage, creating a hole in his leg as well as the bone being exposed. Throughout the music video, long-distance camera angles superimposed Fatone's face on Wade Robson's body, as the latter substituted in his place due to the sustained injury. Production costs were reported to be $2.5 million (equivalent to $4.7 million in 2025), making it one of the most expensive music videos of all time. The video debuted on MTV's Making the Video on May 28, 2001. Filming lasted for over two straight days, during which the band members were not able to sleep and complained about being overworked.

O'Brien described the music video as "Part-infomercial parody, part-club night, part-Warholian expedition" and opined that it is "dizzying".

=== Synopsis ===
The music video begins with Sandra McCoy holding a cereal bowl with Alpha-Bits watching the commercial of Justin Timberlake advertising pop to her: "Hey you! Yeah, I'm talking to you, sassy girl. Need a little ahh in your step? Try this on for size: i-i-i-i-i-it's Pop! I-i-i-it tastes great and makes you feel kind of funny, not here, not down there, but all up in this area. And, c-coming J-July 24, 2001, Jumbo-pop."

She drops her cereal bowl, and the camera passes through three pieces spelling the word "POP". After the music starts, the video takes place at a colorful disco club with NSYNC performing on a lighted circle with the word "POP" in a neon sign behind them. While they are singing, Timberlake is also on a spinning spiral, and Chasez is in the crowd. Many special effects, including fast-motion, bullet-time, and computer-generated warp transitions, are used. During the song's breakdown, the group performs an extended choreographed sequence, while they are seen in various outfits. At the end of the video, Timberlake begins to beatbox for thirty seconds, while the other members float in the background.

== Live performances ==
NSYNC performed "Pop" at the 2001 MTV Video Music Awards on September 6, where they were accompanied by Michael Jackson.

== Track listings ==
- US 12-inch single

A1. "Pop" (Deep Dish Cha-Ching remix) – 11:49
B1. "Pop" (Pablo La Rosa's Hard Sync mix) – 6:29
B2. "Pop" (Terminalhead vocal remix edit) – 4:04
B3. "Pop" (Deep Dish Cha-Ching remix edit) – 4:13

- Canadian CD single
1. "Pop" – 2:55
2. "Pop" (no breakdown) – 2:29
- Australian, New Zealand, and Japanese CD single
1. "Pop" (album version) – 3:57
2. "Pop" (radio version) – 2:55
3. "Pop" (Deep Dish Cha-Ching remix radio edit) – 4:12
4. "Pop" (Terminalhead vocal remix) – 5:23
- UK CD single
1. "Pop" (radio version) – 2:55
2. "Pop" (Pablo La Rosa's Hard Sync mix) – 6:29
3. "Pop" (Deep Dish Cha-Ching remix radio edit) – 4:12
4. "Pop" (instrumental) – 2:54
- UK cassette single
1. "Pop" (radio version) – 2:55
2. "Pop" (Pablo La Rosa's Hard Sync mix) – 6:29
3. "Pop" (instrumental) – 2:54
- European CD single
1. "Pop" (album version) – 3:57
2. "Pop" (instrumental) – 3:21

== Credits and personnel ==
Credits are adapted from the liner notes of "Pop".

Recording

- Recorded at Westlake Recording Studios, Los Angeles, and Metalworks Studios, Toronto

Personnel

- Justin Timberlake – songwriter, producer, arranger, beatbox
- BT – songwriter, producer, arranger, engineer, programmer, mixing
- Wade J. Robson – songwriter, producer, arranger
- Mike Tucker – vocal recording engineer
- Carlos Vasquez – additional beat programming
- Chris Haggerty – digital editing
- Richard Fortus – electric guitar, bass
- Kenny Blank – additional guitar
- Chaz Harper – mastering

== Charts ==
=== Weekly charts ===
Weekly chart performance for "Pop"
Chart (2001)	Peak position
Australia (ARIA)	10
Australian Dance (ARIA)	1
Austria (Ö3 Austria Top 40)	49
Belgium (Ultratop 50 Flanders)	39
Belgium (Ultratip Bubbling Under Wallonia)	14
Canada (Nielsen SoundScan)	16
Canada (Nielsen SoundScan) Import	1
Croatia International (HRT)	1
Europe (Eurochart Hot 100)	20
Europe (European Hit Radio)	18
Germany (GfK)	30
Ireland (IRMA)	21
Italy (FIMI)	34
Italy (Musica e dischi)	36
Latvia (Latvijas Top 30)	18
Netherlands (Dutch Top 40)	34
Netherlands (Single Top 100)	32
New Zealand (Recorded Music NZ)	19
Norway (VG-lista)	7
Portugal (AFP)	6
Scottish Singles Sales (Official Charts)	11
Spain (Promusicae)	11
Spain Airplay (Top 40 Radio)	3
Sweden (Sverigetopplistan)	19
Switzerland (Schweizer Hitparade)	40
UK Singles (Official Charts)	9
UK Airplay (Music Week)	44
UK Indie (Official Charts)	1
US Billboard Hot 100	19
US Pop Airplay (Billboard)	5
US Rhythmic Airplay (Billboard)	23

=== Year-end charts ===
2001 year-end chart performance for "Pop"
Chart (2001)	Position
Brazil (Crowley)	87
Canada (Nielsen SoundScan)	88
Canada (Nielsen SoundScan) Import	2
Canada Radio (Nielsen BDS)	83
Taiwan (Hito Radio)	50
UK Singles (OCC)	172
US Mainstream Top 40 (Billboard)	49
US Rhythmic Top 40 (Billboard)	92

2002 year-end chart performance for "Pop"
Chart (2002)	Position
Canada (Nielsen SoundScan)	137

== Certifications ==
Certifications for "Pop"
Region	Certification	Certified units/sales
Denmark (IFPI Danmark)	Gold	4,000^{^}
^{^} Shipments figures based on certification alone.

== Release history ==
Release dates and formats for "Pop"
Region	Date	Format(s)	Label(s)	Ref(s).
United States	May 22, 2001	Contemporary hit; rhythmic contemporary radio	Jive	
Japan	June 27, 2001	CD	Jive	
Australia	July 9, 2001	CD	Jive	
United Kingdom	July 9, 2001	CD; cassette	Jive	
