= Epiphany (wrestler) =

American retired professional wrestler

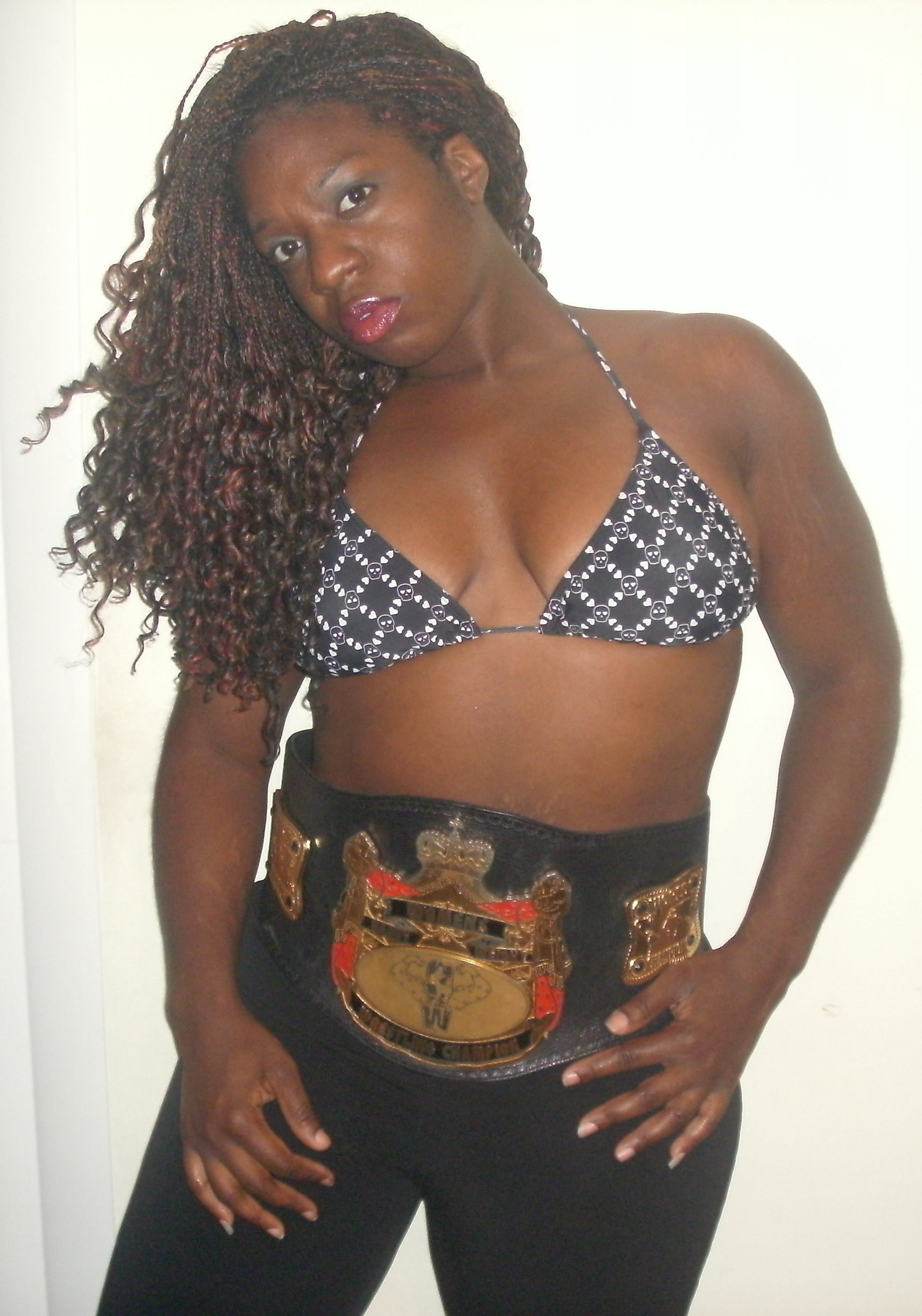

Personal information
- Born: Devorah Simone Frost; August 20, 1981 (age 45) Cleveland, Ohio, United States

Professional wrestling career
- Ring name(s): Devorah; Devra Frost; Epiphany; Epiphany Jones
- Billed height: 5 ft 7 in (1.70 m)
- Billed from: Cleveland, Ohio
- Trained by: Nick Dinsmore; Rip Rogers
- Debut: October 2008
- Retired: July 4, 2013

Devorah Simone Frost (born August 20, 1981), is an American retired professional wrestler, better known by her ring name, Epiphany. She performed for Ohio Valley Wrestling from 2008 to 2013, winning the OVW Women's Championship on three occasions.

== Professional wrestling career ==
=== Ohio Valley Wrestling ===
==== Early career (2008) ====
Frost made her first appearance in Ohio Valley Wrestling (OVW) as a production assistant in November 2008. During her first appearance, she was carried out after Pat Buck attacked her during a hardcore falls count anywhere match between Buck and Rob Conway. She was not seen again until Derby City Wrestling's Christmas Chaos event during a match between Theta Lambda Psi (TPL) and the team of Ben Eclipse (Benjamin Bray and Jesse Mercer) where she came out to counter the interference of TLP's Reggie.

==== Women's Championship reigns (2009–2011) ====
On May 17, 2009, Frost (under the ring name Epiphany) made her debut to the company as part of an eight-woman tag team match refereed by Sojourner Bolt at OVW's Future Talent Showcase event. Epiphany, along with Bailey Parker, Adrienne and Belle Von Black lost to the team of C.J. Lane, Taryn Shay, Jessica Cheyanne and Odessa Firechild. On June 28 at OVW's Trial by Fire event, after winning her tag team match with Andrew Lacroix against Hog Wild and Taryn Shay, Epiphany attacked Adrienne, Bailey Parker, C.J. Lane and Jessica Cheyenne during a tag team match. She then challenged the other women to take her on during OVW television. During the weeks following, Epiphany took out each female during one-on-one matches or attacking them during matches for which she was not scheduled. On July 26 at OVW's Futureshock event, Epiphany once again attacked C.J. Lane, but Melody returned to save Lane. Epiphany then received a match for the OVW Women's Championship against Melody on the August 12 episode of OVW, defeating her and winning the championship for the first time. On September 22, at OVW's Capitol Punishment event, Epiphany successfully defended her championship against C.J. Lane. On September 27 at OVW's Fall Brawl, Epiphany teamed up with Taryn Shay in a losing effort to Lane and Bailey Parker, with Lane earning a championship match. On the September 30 episode of OVW, Epiphany defeated Lane to retain her championship. However, she lost the championship to The Blossom Twins on the October 12 episode of OVW, after the two twins switched, ending her reign at 56 days. After time off Epiphany, made her return to the women's division as a spectator for match 1 of what would be a best of 3 series between Taryn Shay and C.J. Lane for contendership for the OVW Women's Championship. Later it was reported by Josie that Epiphany attacked Shay in order to take her spot in a contendership match, which she would go on to lose via disqualification against Lane.

On the February 3, 2010 episode of OVW, Epiphany served as the special guest referee for the match between Josie and Shay. Epiphany disqualified Josie and gave Shay the championship, which caused a brawl between the two in the end of the match. Later, Josie offered Epiphany a title shot, which ended in a no contest when the remaining girls on the roster would interfere, surprisingly pick sides; Taryn Shay and C.J. Lane on behalf of Epiphany and The Blossoms on behalf of Josie. Epiphany teamed up with Shay on the February 17 episode of OVW, defeating Lane and Josie. However, Epiphany, Lane and Shay lost to The Blossom Twins and Josie on February 28 at OVW's Retribution event in a six-women tag team match. On the March 3 episode of OVW, Epiphany and Shay lost to The Blossoms in a tag team match. The following week, on the March 10 episode of OVW, Epiphany lost to Hannah Blossom in a singles match. However, on the March 31 episode of OVW, Epiphany defeated Hannah Blossom. In the summer of 2010, Epiphany teamed up with various partners against opponents like Lane, Shay and The Blossoms. On December 10 at OVW's Saturday Night Special event, Epiphany teamed with her real-life cousin Rudy Switchblade to defeat C.J. Lane and Paredyse. Going onto 2011, Epiphany took part of several tag team and singles matches against opponents like Lane, Jessie Belle Smothers, Taeler Hendrix and Solo Darling.

==== Various feuds (2012–2013) ====
On the January 4, 2012 episode of OVW, Epiphany defeated C.J. Lane. Epiphany also pinned Taeler Hendrix on the February 15 episode of OVW during a dark match. Epiphany then won a three-way match against both Lane and Hendrix. On the April 18 episode of OVW, Epiphany teamed with Randy Royal against Taeler Hendrix and Dylan Bostic in a winning effort, earning a championship match against Hendrix. The following week at the April 25 episode of OVW, Hendrix defeated Epiphany to retain the Women's Championship. On May 12 at OVW's Saturday Night Special event, Epiphany and Royal defeated Blair Alexxis and Paredyse and Taeler Hendrix and Dylan Bostic in a three-way tag team match. On the May 16 edition of episode 665, Hendrix defeated Heidi Douglas in a dark match. On June 2, at OVW's Saturday Night Special, Epiphany defeated Hendrix to win the OVW Women's Championship for the second time. On the June 27 episode of OVW, Ken Wayne (member of the Board of Directors) vacated all of the championships in the promotion, leaving Epiphany's reign at 25 days. This led to a match between Epiphany and Hendrix for the vacant championship on July 7 at OVW's Saturday Night Special in an evening gown match which Hendrix won after Dylan Bostic distracted Epiphany. On the August 1 episode of OVW, Epiphany defeated Scarlett Bordeaux, and Heidi Lovelace, Jessie Belle Smothers and Taeler Hendrix in a fatal-four-way match on the August 8 episode of OVW in a dark match. On the October 31 episode of OVW, Epiphany started a feud with Jessie Belle after defeating her in a singles match. On the November 7 episode of OVW, Jessie Belle and Heidi Lovelace defeated Epiphany and Taeler Hendrix in a tag team match. On the November 14 episode of OVW, Epiphany faced Jessie Belle which ended up as a draw.

After a long losing streak, Epiphany finally got a victory over Taeler Hendrix on the January 26, 2013 episode of OVW to become the number one contender for the Women's Championship. Since February, Eddie Diamond showed his feelings of love to Epiphany, which started as a storyline between the two. At OVW's Saturday Night Special on February 2, Epiphany was unsuccessful in winning the championship from Jessie Belle, after a distraction from Eddie Diamond. However, Epiphany got a rematch for the championship at OVW's Saturday Night Special on March 2, in which Epiphany would defeat Jessie Belle to win the OVW Women's Championship for the third time. On the April 6 episode of OVW, Epiphany defeated Taeler Hendrix in the main event of the show to retain her championship. On the April 20 episode of OVW, Epiphany lost the Women's Championship to Trina after Eddie Diamond's interference backfired.

On the July 3 edition of OVW episode 724, when Lei'D Tapa was facing off against Holly Blossom. Epiphany came to ringside and pulled down the hood on one of the cameramen to reveal that this is Eddie Diamond, with Epiphany believing that Tapa is his secret girlfriend. This would set up a singles match at the Saturday Night Special on July 3, with Tapa winning the match thanks to Eddie Diamond. After the match, Epiphany powerbombed Eddie and broke up with him. The following day she announced on her Facebook page that she retired from pro wrestling.

== Championships and accomplishments ==
- New Focus Wrestling
  - NFW Women's Championship (1 time)
- Ohio Valley Wrestling
  - OVW Women's Championship (3 times)
  - Miss OVW (2009)
