= Jessie Belle Smothers =

American model, professional wrestling valet and professional wrestler

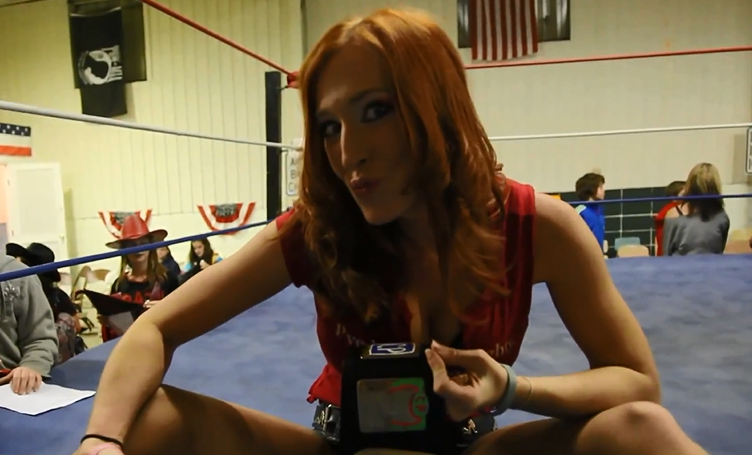
- Smothers in 2012

Personal information
- Born: Jessie Belle McCoy; July 2, 1985 (age 41) Bardstown, Kentucky, U.S.

Professional wrestling career
- Ring name(s): Jessie Belle; Jessie Belle Smothers; Jessie Jones
- Billed height: 5 ft 9 in (175 cm)
- Billed weight: 145 lb (66 kg; 10.4 st)
- Billed from: Nashville, Tennessee; Savannah, Georgia
- Trained by: Mickie Knuckles; Mitch Ryder; Tracy Smothers; Ohio Valley Wrestling
- Debut: 2010

Jessie Belle McCoy (born July 2, 1985), better known by her ring name Jessie Belle Smothers or simply Jessie Belle, is an American model, professional wrestling valet, and professional wrestler. She is signed to Ohio Valley Wrestling (OVW).

== Professional wrestling career ==
=== Early career ===
Jessie made her professional wrestling debut at a Firestorm event on January 8, 2010, where she lost to Sassy Stephie. Jessie made her debut for Blue Water Federation (BWF), on September 25, 2010, at a BWF event, where she teamed up with Sterling Von Erich in a losing effort to Jennifer Blake and Dustin Daniels in a mixed-tag-team match.

=== Ohio Valley Wrestling (2011–2015) ===
Jessie Belle made her debut for Ohio Valley Wrestling (OVW) on the April 27, 2011, edition of OVW episode 610, where she teamed up with her kayfabe sister Izza Belle Smothers in a losing effort to The Blossom Twins (Hannah and Holly Blossom). On the May 11 edition of OVW episode 612, The Smothers Twisted Daughters teamed up with Shiloh Jonze in a losing effort to The Blossom Twins and Johnny Spade in six-person-mixed-tag-team match. On the May 14 edition of OVW's Saturday Night Special, Jessie competed in a gauntlet match for the OVW Women's Championship, but was unsuccessful in capturing the title.

On the May 27 edition of OVW episode 614, Jessie would enter a feud with Taryn Shay after losing to her in her singles debut match. Jessie would trade victories with Shay over the next couple of weeks. On the July 2 edition of OVW's Saturday Night Special, The Smothers Twisted Daughters defeated Shay and the reigning Women's Champion Lady JoJo after Izza Belle pinned JoJo. On the July 20 edition of OVW episode 622, Jessie teamed up with Randy Terrez to defeat Adam Revolver and Epiphany in a mixed tag team match. On the August 3 edition of OVW episode 624, The Smothers Twisted Daughters teamed up with The Blossom Twins to defeat C. J. Lane, Epiphany, Solo Darling and Taryn Shay in an 8 divas-tag-team match. On August 6 at OVW's Saturday Night Special, Jessie accompanied Izza Belle Smothers where she defeated Lady JoJo with Taryn Shay to win the OVW Women's Championship for the first time. On the August 10 edition of OVW episode 624, The Smothers Twisted Daughters competed against The Blossom Twins, in a winning effort. On the August 31 edition of OVW episode 628, Jessie teamed up with Tracy Smothers to defeat C. J. Lane and Mysterie in dark match. On the September 14 edition of OVW episode 630, Jessie teamed up with The Blossom Twins in a losing effort to C.J. Lane, Epiphany and Solo Darling in dark match. Smothers now under the ring name Jessie Belle returned to OVW on the June 27, 2012 edition of OVW episode 671, where she competed in a number one contenders fatal four-way match, but was unsuccessful in winning the match. On the July 11 edition of OVW episode 673, Jessie defeated Heidi Lovelace in a dark match.

On the July 25 edition of OVW episode 675, Jessie defeated then Women's Champion Taeler Hendrix in a singles match, thus earning a title opportunity. On the August 1 edition of OVW episode 676. Jessie teamed up with Alex Silva in a losing effort to Hendrix and Dylan Bostic in a mixed tag-team match. On August 4 at OVW's Saturday Night Special, Jessie challenged Hendrix for the OVW Women's Championship but was unsuccessful in winning the title. For weeks, Jessie competed against Hendrix, losing to her on several occasions. On the September 26 edition of OVW episode 684, Jessie finally defeated Hendrix in a dark match with the title not being online. On the October 10 edition of OVW episode 686, Jessie teamed up with Lovelace against Hendrix and Lylah Lodge in a winning effort. On the October 24 edition of OVW episode 688, Jessie teamed up with Lovelace and The Blossom Twins against Hendrix, Epiphany, Josette Bynum and Killa Kaila in a winning effort.

On the October 31 edition of OVW episode 689, Jessie entered a feud with Epiphany after competing against her in a match, that ended in a no-contest. Later that night, Jessie defeated Hendrix, December, Bynum, Emily Elizabeth, Epiphany and Scarlett Bordeaux in a Halloween Costume Contest - battle Royal. On the November 7 edition of OVW episode 690, Jessie teamed up with Lovelace against Epiphany and Hendrix in a winning effort. On the November 14 edition of OVW episode 691, Jessie competed against Epiphany in a singles match. The match ended in a no-contest after both competitors were disqualified. Later that night, she appeared in a in-ring segment involving Trailer Park Trash and Josette Bryum. On the November 29 edition of OVW episode 693, Jessie competed against Hendrix in a losing effort after an interference by Dylan Bostic.

On the December 8 edition of OVW episode 694, Jessie defeated Lovelace to become the No #1 contender for OVW Women's Championship to gain a title shot against Hendrix at the January edition of OVW's Saturday Night Special. On the January 3 edition of OVW episode 697, Jessie defeated Epiphany with Hendrix on commentary. At the January 5 edition of OVW's Saturday Night Special, Jessie defeated Hendrix to win the OVW Women's Championship for the first time after Bostic's interference backfired. On the January 16 edition of OVW episode 700, Belle successfully defended the OVW Women's Championship against Hendrix despite the pre-match attack and again on February 2 at OVW's Saturday Night Special, against Epiphany. Belle dropped the championship to Epiphany in a rematch on March 2 at OVW's Saturday Night Special. Jessie Belle teamed up with Stephon J. Baxter III dressed in drag as Stephon-E to face against The Blossom Twins, Hendrix and Lovely Lylah and eventual winners Lei'D Tapa and Ray Lynn, in a four-corner tag team match. In mid-January 2014, Belle returned to the promotion and defeated Ray Lynn and Tapa in a three-way non-title match, after pinning the attacked Lynn.

During the next few weeks, a masked man would come in the ring and attack all female wrestlers in OVW during their matches, who would be revealed as Randy Royal on March 1 at OVW's Saturday Night Special, where Belle defeated Tapa and won the OVW Women's Championship for a second time. After the match, Belle would pay Royal for attacking all of the females in the locker room, turning heel. She lost the title to Tapa on April 6.

After trading victories with Mary Elizabeth Monroe and Rebel, she left the company for the second time, and returned in mid–2015. On November 21, Belle went on to win the OVW Women's Championship in a battle royal, after the title was vacant for one year.

=== Shine Wrestling (2012–present) ===
McCoy, under her ring name Jessie Belle Smothers, made her debut for new women's wrestling promotion Shine Wrestling, stylized as SHINE, on February 22, 2013, in Ybor City, Florida, where she faced off against Santana Garrett in a losing effort. On May 24, at the SHINE 10, Smothers teamed up with Sassy Stephie and Sojournor Bolt in a winning effort defeating the team of Heidi Lovelace, Luscious Latasha and Solo Darling. Belle formed a tag-team with Sassy Stephie called The S-N-S Express on September 28, at the SHINE 13, where they faced The American Sweethearts (Garrett and Amber O'Neal), in winning effort when Stephie pinned O'Neal after an Kiss My Sass. The S-N-S Express lost to Lovelace and Darling.

The S-N-S Express competed in a tag-team tournament to determine the first ever Shine Tag Team Champions, defeating MsEERIE (Christina Von Eerie and MsChif) in the Quarterfinals before losing to eventually winners The Lucha Sisters (Leva Bates and Mia Yim).

=== Other promotions (2011–2014) ===
Jessie Belle made her debut for Florida Underground Wrestling (FUW), on November 15, 2011, at the FUW event in Largo, Florida, where she defeated Ferrari. On the November 22 edition of FUW Tapings, Jessie defeated Jessika Haze with Ferrari as the special guest referee. On the December 12 edition of FUW Tapings, Jessie teamed up with The James boys (Luke and Rich James) against Deimos, Ferrari and Marc Mandrake, in a winning effort. On the December 30 edition of FUW Tapings, Belle entered a feud with Mercedes Justine after Smothers competed against Justine, in a losing effort. On the January 10 edition of FUW Tapings, Jessie defeated Mercedes Justine by disqualification. On the January 17 edition of FUW Tapings, Jessie teamed up with Trinity in a losing effort to Mercedes and Ferrari. The following week, Jessie competed against Trinity, in a winning effort. On the January 31 edition of FUW Tapings, Jessie competed in a losing effort to Mercedes. The following week, Jessie defeated Merceded in a singles match. On the February 21 edition of FUW Tapings, Jessie defeated Solo Darling in a singles match. On the February 27 edition of FUW Tapings, Jessie competed against Justine, in a winning effort. The following month, Jessie defeated Justine on several occasions.

Jessie made her debut for National Wrestling Alliance (NWA) on February 19, 2012, at a NWA event, where she defeated Missdiss Lexia in the final of the tournament to become the no number 1 contender to the NWA Top Of Texas Women's Championship. Later that night, she defeated Starr to become the NWA Top Of Texas Women's Champion. Jessie made her debut for Jersey Championship Wrestling (JCW), on August 9 at the JCW Arena Chicks at the Gathering event in Cave-in-Rock, Illinois, where she competed against Ring Girl Randy, in a losing effort. Jessie made her debut for RPW, on July 27, at the RPW Fair Warning event in Chicago, Illinois, where she teamed up with Nikki St. John to defeat Serenity and Taylor Made in a no disqualification tag-team match. On January 4, 2014, in Kingsport, Tennessee, Smothers challenged Kacee Carlisle for the NWA World Women's Championship but was unsuccessful in winning the championship.

On November 11, 2011, Jessie made her debut for Covey Pro, defeating Mickie James to win the Covey Pro Women's Championship. Her reign lasted nearly a year, when she lost it to Mary Elizabeth Hatfield on October 13, 2012. In her rematch clause on December 8, Jessie defeated Hatfield to win the championship for a second time. Smothers wrestled at an American Championship Wrestling event on July 21, 2012. At the event, A Fight For Dillion Wood, Smothers squared off against Mickie James. James won the bout gaining revenge for losing her Covey Pro Women's Title to Smothers the previous year.

=== WOW - Women Of Wrestling (2013–present) ===
Smothers started to wrestle for Women of Wrestling (WOW) under the name Jessie Jones, under the guidance of WOW's original Selina Majors. Jones worked as a face until WOW moved to AXS TV. In an episode that aired on January 25, 2019, Jones argued with Majors, which caused her turning heel in the process, her new character showed to be a stereotype of a redneck who wants to "make wrestling great again". Jones and Big Rig Betty won the WOW World Tag Team Championship in a match that took place August 3, 2024 and aired on television the weekend of November 30, 2024.

== Championships and accomplishments ==
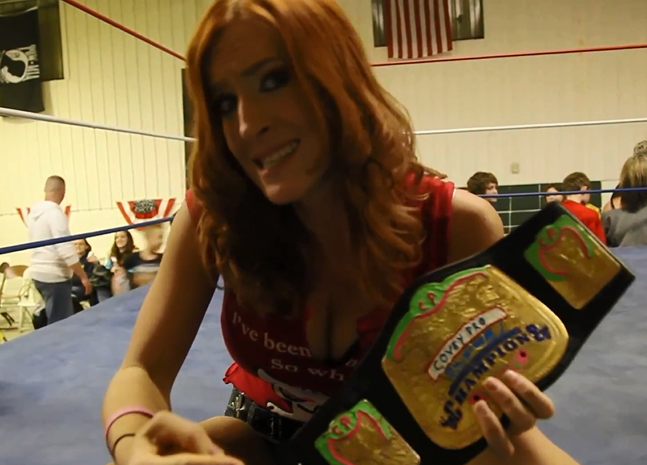
Smothers is a two-time Covey Pro Women's Champion

- 304 Wrestling
  - 304 Women's Championship (2 times)
- Covey Promotions
  - Covey Pro Women's Championship (2 times)
- Ohio Valley Wrestling
  - OVW Women's Championship (11 times)
- Ohio Word Wrestling
  - OWW Women's Championship (2 times)
- National Wrestling Alliance
  - NWA Top Of Texas Women's Championship (1 time)
- Renegade Wrestling Alliance
  - RWA Women's Championship (2 times, current)
- Wrestling All Star Promotions
  - WASP Women's Championship (1 time, current)
- Women of Wrestling
  - WOW World Tag Team Championship (1 time, current, with Big Rig Betty)
