= Tag team =

Team of multiple professional wrestlers

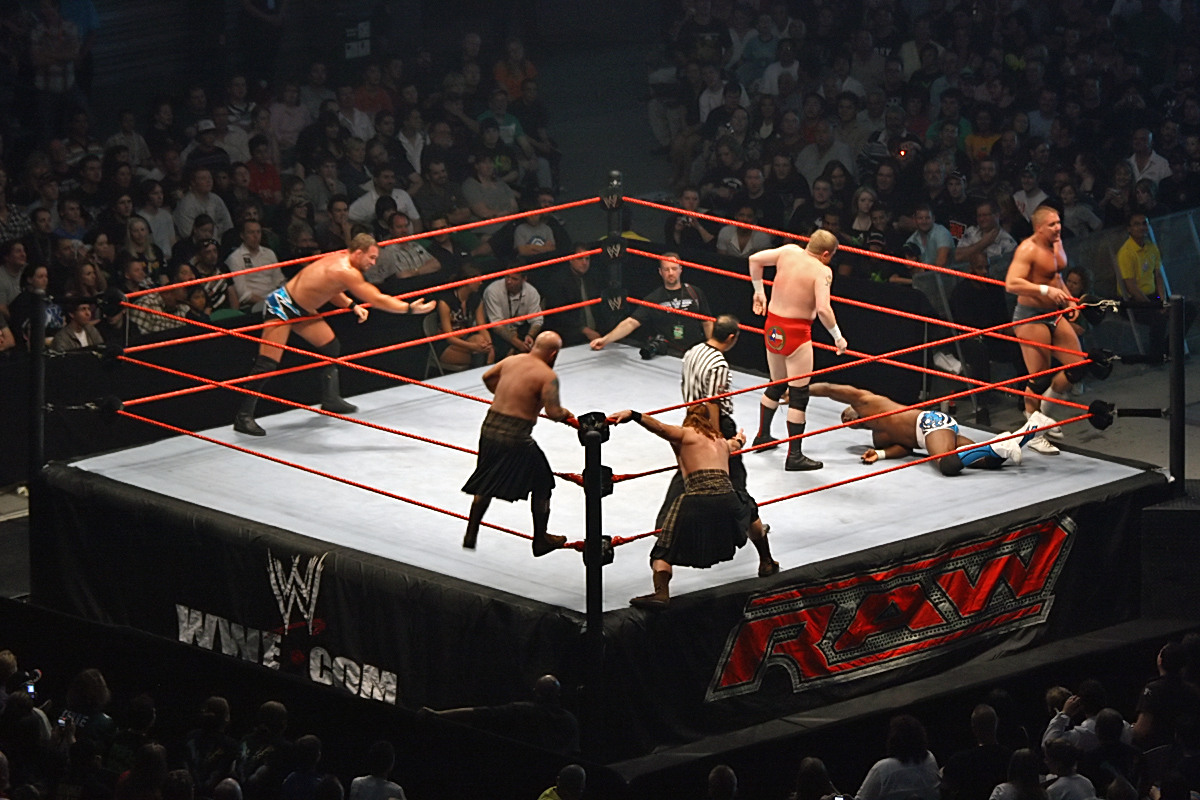
Action in a triple threat tag team match for the WWE World Tag Team Championship. Shelton Benjamin (on the mat) from The World's Greatest Tag Team has been isolated in the corner of champions Cade and Murdoch, well away from partner Charlie Haas; either of these teams can tag in the third team, The Highlanders.

Tag team wrestling is a type of professional wrestling in which matches are contested between teams of multiple wrestlers. Tag teams may be made up of wrestlers who normally wrestle in singles competition, but more commonly are made of established teams who wrestle regularly as a unit and have a team name and identity.

In most team matches, only one competitor per team is allowed in the ring at a time. This status as the active or legal wrestler may be transferred by physical contact, most commonly a palm-to-palm tag which resembles a high five.

The team-based match has been a mainstay of professional wrestling since the mid-twentieth century, and most promotions have sanctioned a championship division for tag teams.

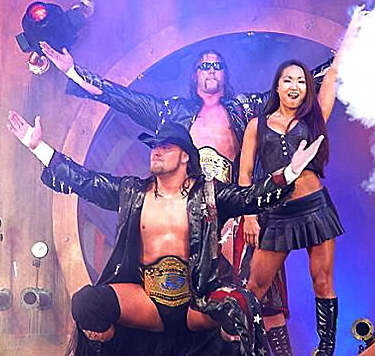
America's Most Wanted (Chris Harris, (back) James Storm and valet Gail Kim)), a former tag team that wrestled for TNA

== History ==
The first "World" tag team championship was promoted in San Francisco in the early 1950s. Tag matches with three-man teams were developed, and in some territories, a championship division was instituted for these teams, but the concept failed to become widely popular; outside Mexico, multi-man tag matches are seen as a special attraction.

Typically, a tag team championship is awarded to and defended by a team of two. However, during the 1970s and 1980s, a dominant trio in the NWA known as The Fabulous Freebirds won several regional tag team championships and were allowed to employ any combination of the group's members in their title defenses. In kayfabe, this made it difficult for challengers to prepare for their upcoming title fights since the challengers did not know exactly whom they were facing. This was an effective gimmick and is still utilized by other wrestling companies. The stipulation has become traditionally known as the "Freebird Rule".

A common storyline is former tag team partners turning on each other with one member usually turning heel or babyface in the process, which will invariably ignite a feud. This can be used when one member is being called on to develop a new gimmick.

== Tag team match rules ==
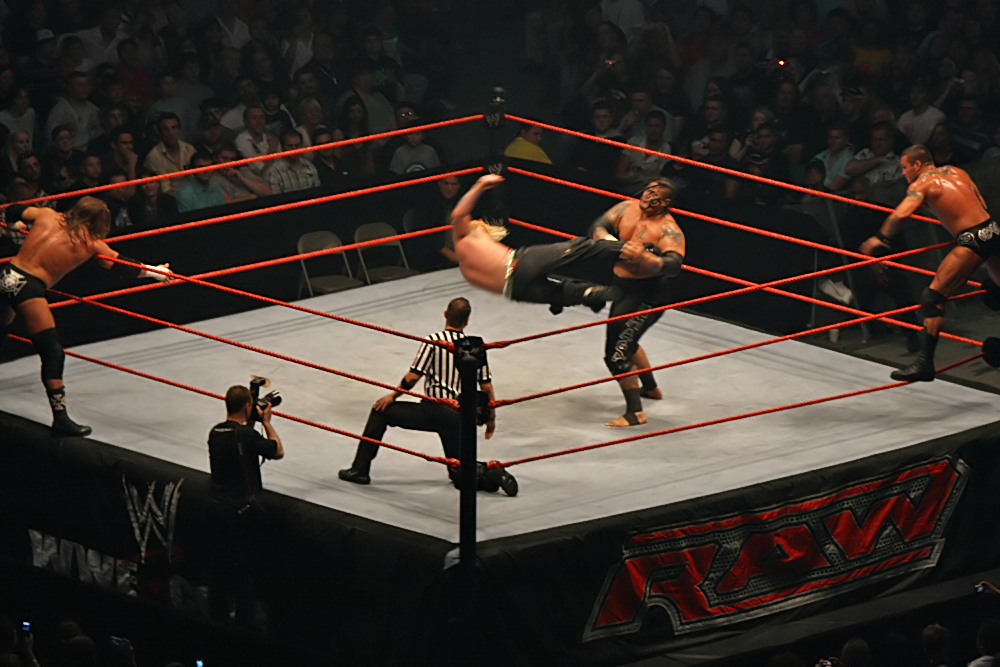
A tag team match in progress – Jeff Hardy kicks Umaga, while their respective partners, Triple H and Randy Orton, encourage them and reach for the tags.

The basic tag team match has two teams of two wrestlers facing off against each other. All standard rules for singles wrestling apply to a team match. However, only one wrestler from each team, called the "legal man" is allowed in the ring at a time (although heels will often flout this rule in an attempt to gang up on a single opponent). All other members of the team wait outside the ropes (on the ring apron or the floor) in the team's specified corner. Only an active/legal wrestler is allowed to score a fall or have a fall scored against him/her. But any wrestler, legal or outside, may face disqualification for himself or his team for violating rules.

Once a tag is made, the wrestler tagging out has a grace period (typically five to ten seconds) to leave the ring before risking disqualification. Offensive cooperation from a team member is allowed during this time window; thus it is rather commonplace for both members of a team, especially heel teams, to milk this grace period and have two men in the ring simultaneously with only one member of an opposing team

The following are standard requisites for making a legal tag:

- Both feet of the wrestler on the outside must be flat on the apron.
- The wrestler outside the ring must be touching the tag rope tied in the corner (or the turnbuckle pad in-rings which have no tag rope) with hand outstretched OVER top rope, not through it.
- Tags are legal as long as the two team members touch.
- The referee has to see and/or hear the contact between the two wrestlers in order for the tag to be legal.

As the ultimate authority over the match, a referee may overlook any of these at his discretion, and during the frenzied action, often will be more lenient with them.

In some multi-man tag matches in lucha libre, a wrestler can make himself the team's legal man simply by setting foot in the ring, and his partner then leaves. This allows for action to become nearly continuous. Two referees, one stationed inside the ring and one on the floor, are employed to maintain order for this type of match.

== Types of tags ==
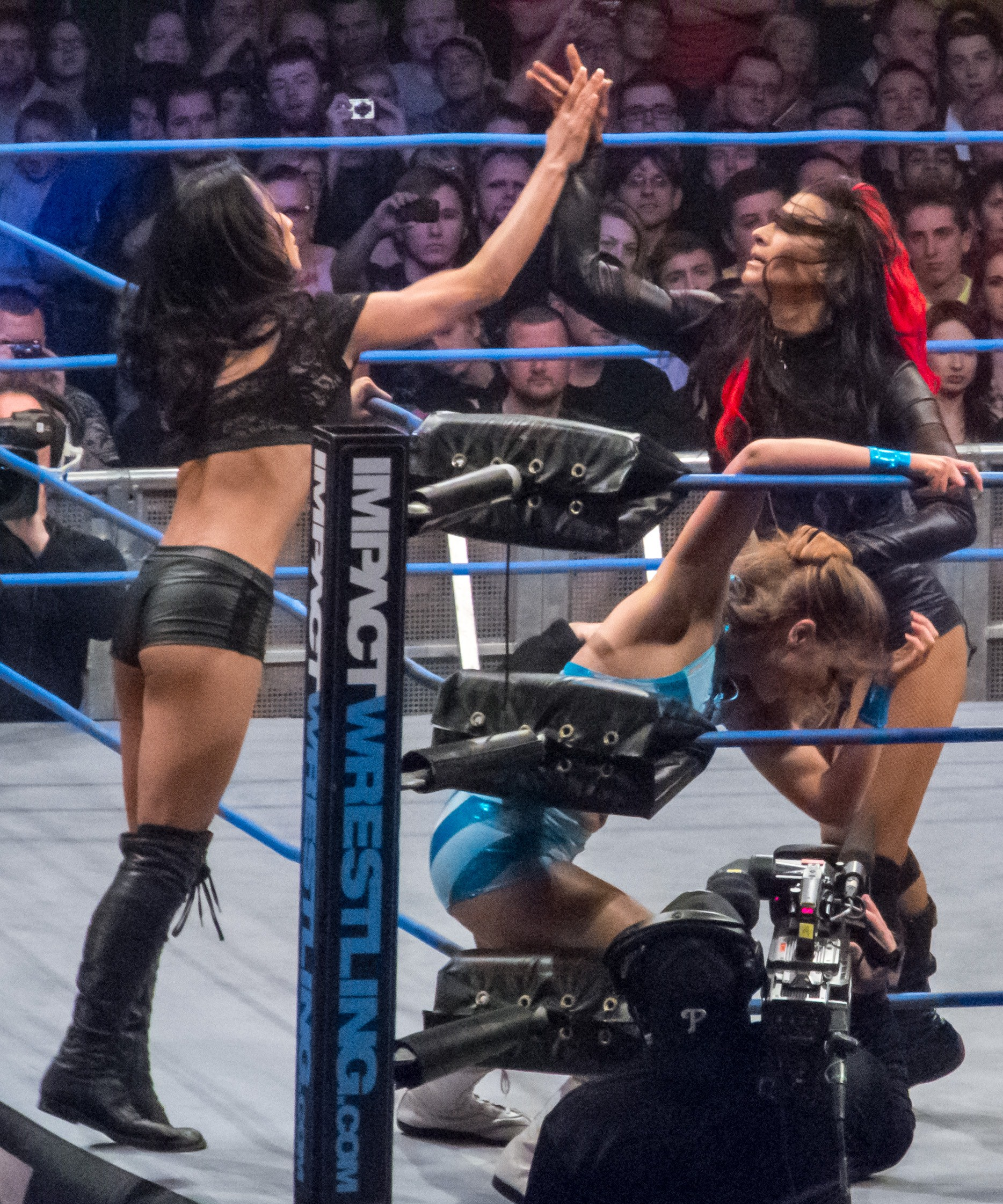
Tara (right) tags her partner, Gail Kim, into the match while they isolate a Blossom Twin.

In independent discussion and analysis of matches, certain terms are used to describe specific scenarios involving tag team matches. These are planned and timed to inject drama into a match.

One spot common to many tag team match is the hot tag. One member of one team is in the ring, too weakened to move or otherwise impaired, while his partner watches helplessly, struggling to reach him for a tag. The tension builds as the legal man is unable to tag out until something happens (a second wind, miscommunication between the opponents or another stroke of luck) that allows the first team to tag and reverse the momentum of the match in their favor. When done well, this results in a large audience reaction, and was the typical climax of tag matches for decades. WWE employs this tactic in nearly every tag team match to the point that they fired a referee in 2008 after a botched finish that, while the match produced the intended finish, did not feature a hot tag.

A common variation on the hot tag sees both wrestlers from the heel team attacking a face, while his partner protests to the referee about this bending of the rules (and therefore, unintentionally "distracting" the referee away from the heels). Eventually the weakened face wrestler does make the tag to his partner, who comes in as the fresh man and is able to take on both opponents quite easily.

A blind tag is a legal tag made without the legal opponent's knowledge, usually while his back is turned. This allows the team who uses it an opportunity to confuse the legal opponent, who turns to face what he assumes to be his opponent only to be attacked by the true legal man, often from behind.

== Other terminology ==
A tag team match involving more than two wrestlers per team is often referred to by the total number of people involved (e.g. a six-man tag team match involves two teams of three), while a tag team match involving more than two teams is referred to by normal qualifiers (e.g. a triple threat tag team match involves three teams of two).

In Mexican pro-wrestling, the basic tag team match is referred to as Lucha de Parejas (Doubles Fight), a six-man match as a Lucha de Trios, and an eight-man match as a Lucha Atómica (Atomic Fight).

A "bookend" tag team is a (sometimes derogatory) term for a tag team where the members look and/or dress alike (e.g., The Killer Bees, the British Bulldogs, Los Conquistadores, the Hart Foundation, etc.). Bookends are common in North America and Europe countries, but not in Japan as the promotion of wrestlers to singles championships in that country is based in part on their work in tag team matches.

== See also ==
- Professional wrestling match types
- World Tag Team Championship
- List of tag team championships
