= Blossom Twins =

Professional wrestling tag team

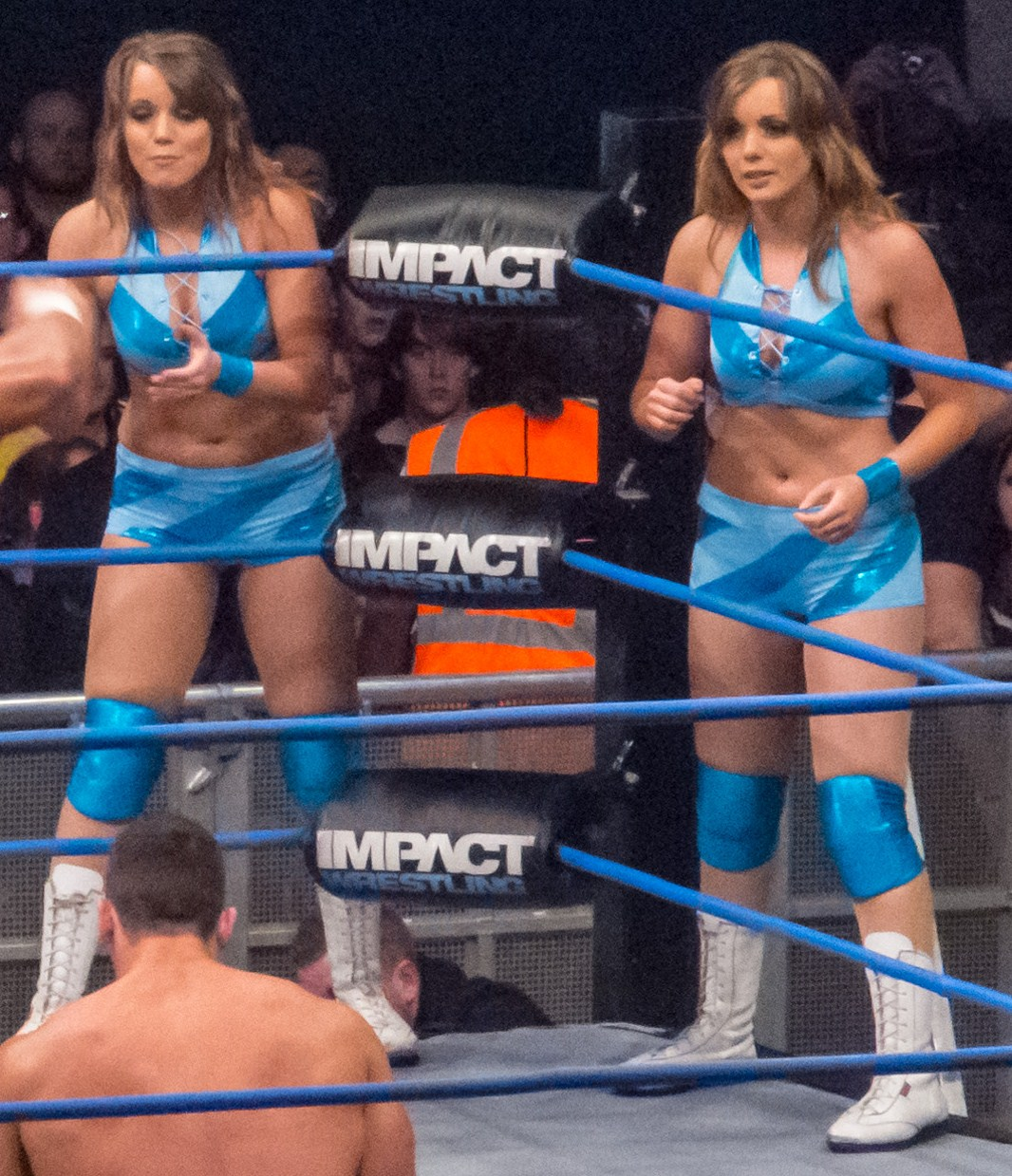
- The Blossom Twins in 2013

Statistics
- Members: Hannah Blossom; Holly Blossom
- Name(s): Team Blossom; The Blossom Twins; The Blossoms; Beatrice & Penelope Bristol; The Bristol Twins
- Billed heights: 5 ft 6 in (168 cm)
- Billed from: Manchester, England
- Debut: 2005
- Years active: 2005 – 2014 (retired)
- Trained by: Rip Rogers; Mike Mondo; Nick Dinsmore

Lucy Knott and Kelly Sharpe (née Knott) (born on 18 February 1988), are a retired twin professional wrestling tag team, better known by their ring names Hannah Blossom and Holly Blossom.

== Early lives ==
The twins grew up in Stockport, Greater Manchester, where they attended St Winifred's RC Primary School. Both became fans of professional wrestling at the age of 12, and admired The Hardy Boyz.

== Professional wrestling career ==
Both the Knott twins began training when they were 15, and debuted in professional wrestling at the age of 16.

=== English promotions (2005–2013) ===
On 4 May 2008, The Blossom Twins made an appearance at the ChickFight X, where they defeated Jade and Maya. At ChickFight XI, they lost to Jetta and Wesna.

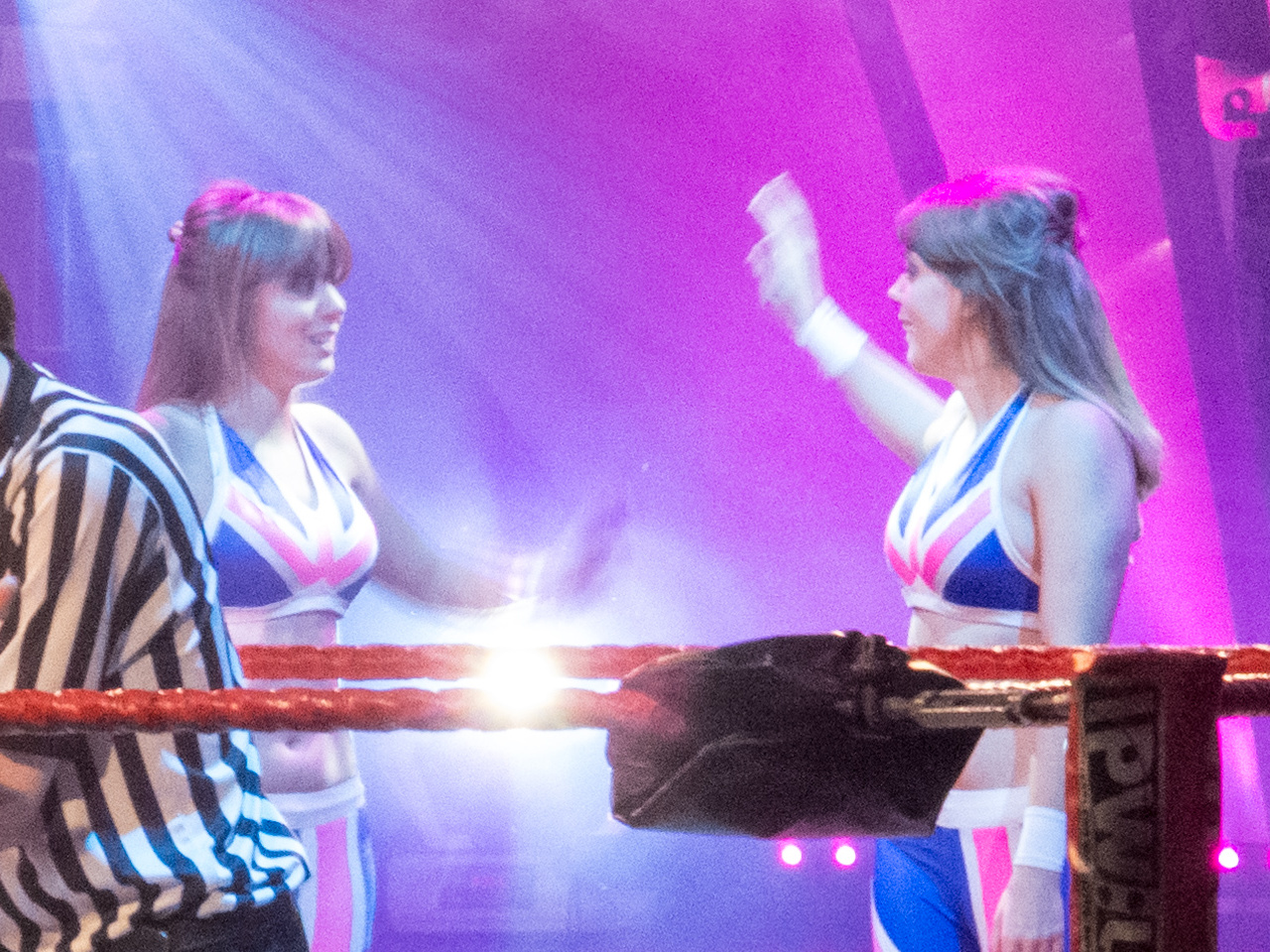
The Blossom Twins in IPW:UK

In 2008, at the Gerry Norton Promotions, The Blossoms defeated CJ Banks & Danny Hope. On 19 September, they teamed with Bubblegum to defeat Generation S.E.X (Brad Flash, Brett Valentine and Mikey Riot). On 10 October, The Blossoms and Travis the Menace defeated Bret Valentine, Brad Flash and Prince Ameen. On 27 February 2011, at Futureshock Wrestling, The Blossoms defeated Becky James and Charlie Quinn. On 30 April 2011, Hannah faced Mickie James to determine the inaugural Covey Pro Women's Champion, but was unsuccessful in winning the championship.

On 8 February 2012, The Blossom Twins debuted for Pro-Wrestling: EVE, as participatants in the promotion's eight-woman Queen of the Ring tournament. Hannah was eliminated from the tournament by Nikki Storm in her first round match, while Holly's match against Sara-Marie Taylor ended in a double disqualification due to interference from both Hannah and Taylor's tag team partner Carmel Jacobs, eliminating them both from the tournament. Later during the pay-per-view, Taylor and Jacobs, known as The Glamour Gym, defeated The Blossom Twins in a tag team match.

=== Ohio Valley Wrestling (2009–2014) ===
On 7 October 2009, Hannah debuted for Ohio Valley Wrestling (OVW). She faced Epiphany for the OVW Women's Championship in her debut match. She won both the match and the championship. Nearly two months later, she defended the championship against Josie, who won the match by pinning Holly, who was aiding her sister illegally. Four days later, the championship was awarded back to Hannah as a result. Hannah held the championship for just two weeks, before Josie defeated her for it on 16 December.

Going into 2010, The Blossoms turned face saving Josie from the attack of C.J. Lane, Epiphany and Taryn Shay on OVW episode 551. The six were involved in a tag team match on 28 February, at OVW's Retribution which The Blossoms and Josie won. On OVW episode 555, Holly defeated Taryn Shay. On OVW episode 556, Epiphany defeated Hannah. After the match C.J. Lane attacked her, leading Holly to challenge her for the title. However, on OVW's The Showcase on 24 April, she lost to Lane. Holly Blossom won the title for a second time, after she defeated Taryn Shay on 31 July, at OVW's Futureshock 2.

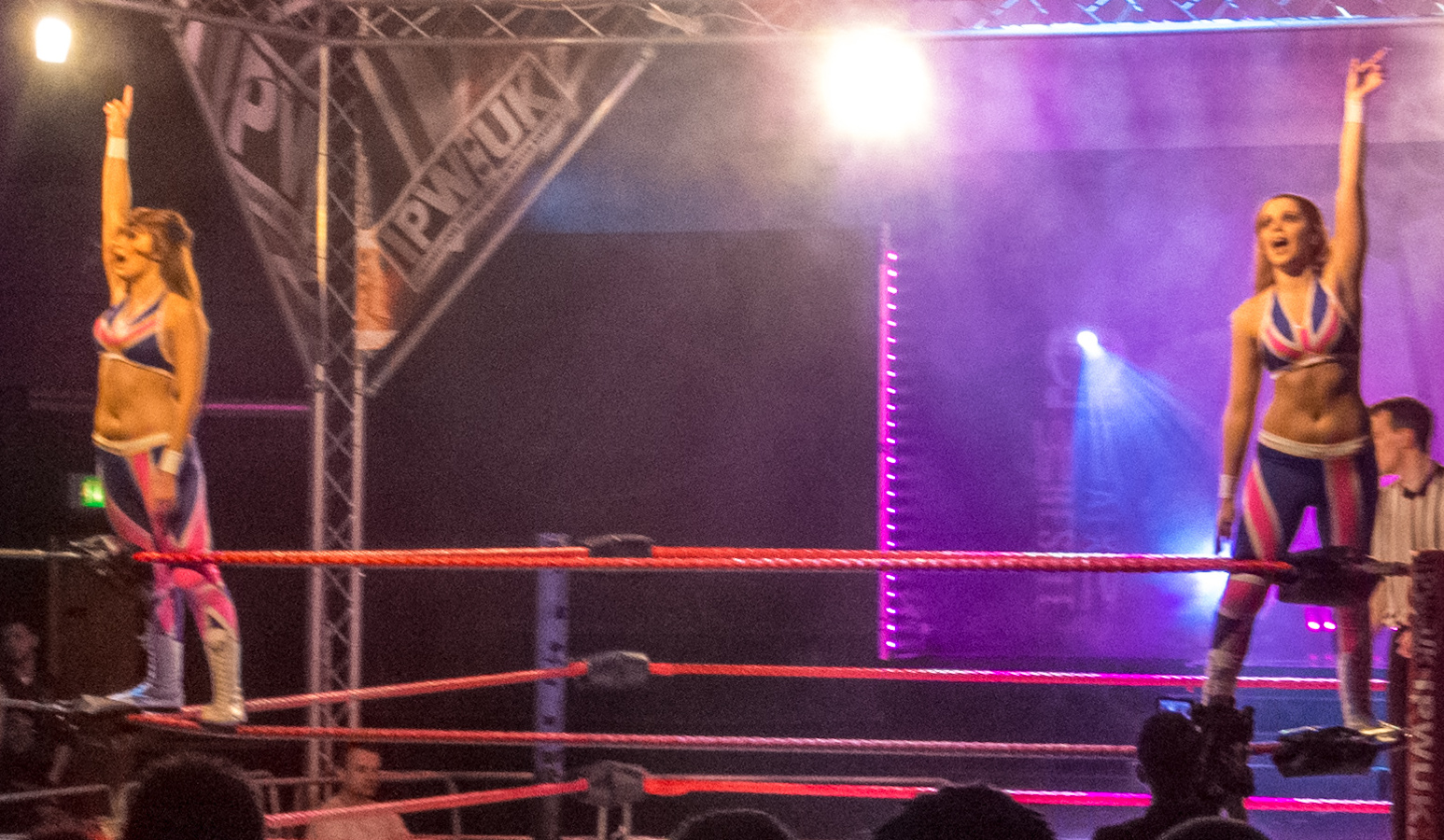
The Blossom twins in 2012

She lost the title to Lady JoJo (formerly Josie) on 28 August, at OVW's Summer Scorcher. In the end of 2010, the duo quickly started a scripted rivalry with Lady JoJo and Taryn Shay, which led to a Loser Leaves OVW match at OVW's Saturday Night Special on 11 November, in which they lost and were forced to leave OVW.

On 19 March 2011 at OVW episode 604, Lady JoJo defeated C.J. Lane to retain her title. After the match Lady JoJo and Taryn Shay continued a beatdown on C.J. Lane when out came The Blossom Twins who attacked JoJo and Shay to help C.J. Lane. Later it was announced that The Blossoms are officially back in OVW. In April, they started a rivalry with Smothers Twisted Daughters (Jessie Belle and Izza Belle Smothers. The teams faced each other on 30 April, at OVW episode 610, in which The Blossoms won. At 7 May, on OVW episode 611, The Blossoms teamed up with Johnny Spade to defeat The Smothers and Shiloh Jonze in a six-person mixed tag team match. The two teams faced again, this time both as faces on episode 625 at 13 August, where The Blossoms lost.

After one-year absence, The Blossoms returned to the promotion at OVW's episode 687 on 20 October 2012 defeating Josette Bynum and Taeler Hendrix in a divas tag team match. On the 24 October edition of OVW episode 688, The Blossom Twins teamed up with Jessie Belle Smothers and Heidi Lovelace in a winning effort defeating Epiphany, Bynum and Killa Kaila and Hendrix. The Blossom Twins return to OVW on the 6 March 2012 edition of OVW Episode 707, where they defeated Hendrix and Lovely Lylah in a dark match despite the pre-match attack. The girls would continue to work dark matches in single and tag action until the 18 May 2012 episode where they worked the live show and won a tag match against Lovely Lylah and Nikki St. John.

On the 3 July edition of OVW episode 724, Hannah defeated Taeler Hendrix in a pre-show dark match. During the episode, Holly faced off against Lei'D Tapa, which ended in a no-contest, when Epiphany came to the ring and challenged Tapa to a match. On the 17 July edition of OVW Episode 726, in a pre-show dark match, The Blossom Twins teamed with Heidi Lovelace in a winning effort defeating Lovely Lylah and The Mean Girls (Hendrix and Envy) after Lylah was pinned by Lovelace.

On the 21 September edition of OVW episode 735, Hannah won a fatal four–way ladder match to win the OVW Women's Championship for the third time, while also turning heel when she knocked Holly off the ladder to take the title. At OVW's Saturday Night Special on 5 October, the evil Hannah lost the title to Lei'D Tapa, ending her reign at 17 days. On 7 January 2014, the twins announced that they are taking a break from wrestling and stating that they are no longer a part of OVW and they took time off wrestling.

=== Total Nonstop Action Wrestling (2012–2014) ===
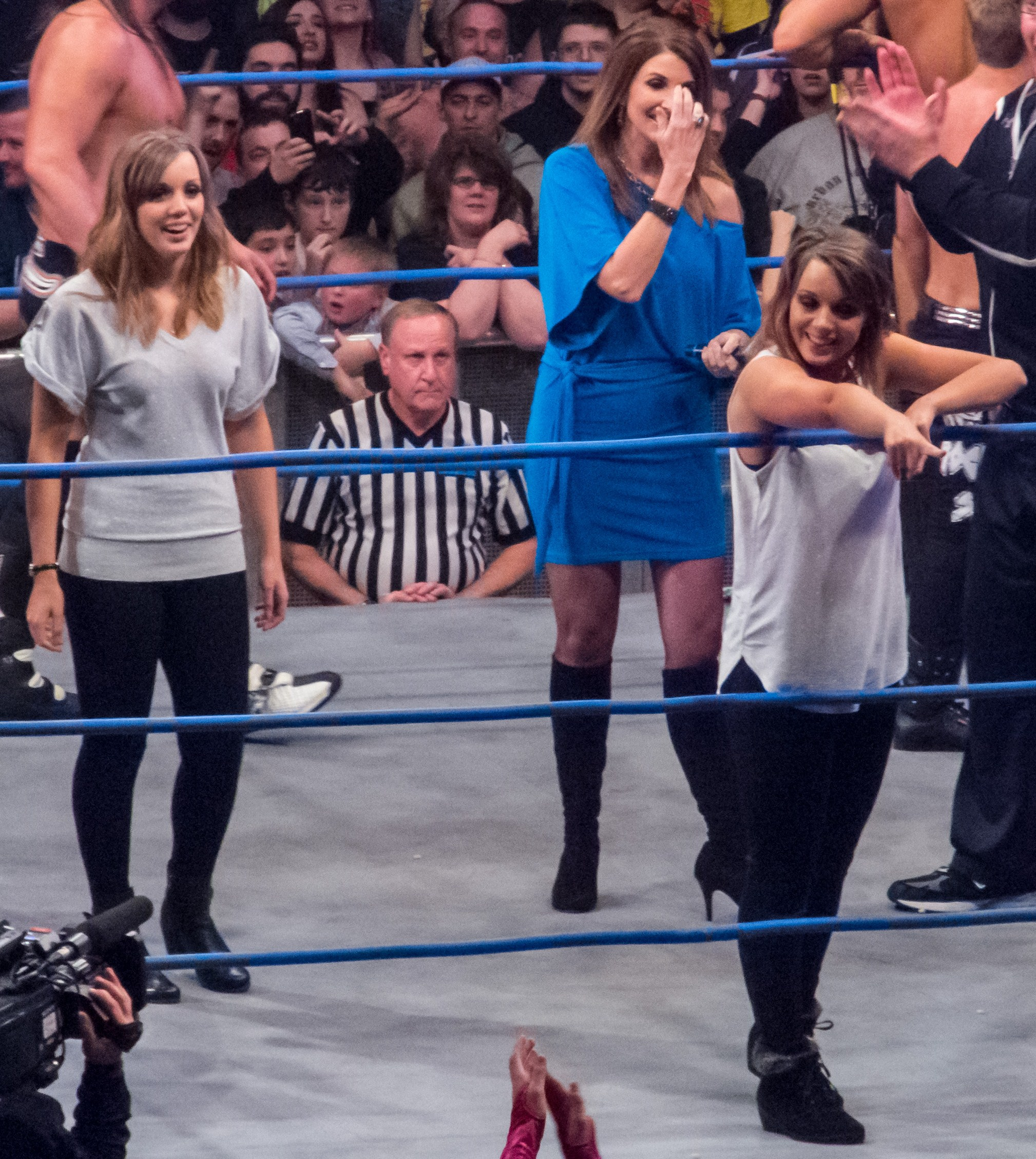
The Blossom Twins in TNA

In 2012, it was announced that The Blossom Twins were to be participants in the Challenge TV reality show TNA Wrestling: British Boot Camp, alongside Rockstar Spud and Marty Scurll as contestants competing for a contract with Total Nonstop Action Wrestling. The show began airing on 1 January and ended on 22 January 2013. In the third episode, The Blossoms Twins were seen at the Hall of Fame ceremony with Marty Scurll. In the final episode, The Blossom Twins faced Gail Kim and Madison Rayne to prove to Hulk Hogan and Dixie Carter they deserve the win, but Rockstar Spud was chosen as the winner of the show's first season.

The Blossoms returned on the 14 February 2013 episode of Impact Wrestling, teaming with Marty Scurll against Gail Kim, Tara and Jessie in a six-person mixed tag team match. The match ended after Kim pinned one of the twins to get the victory for her team. On the first episode of TNA Backstage Pass in a in-ring segment with Dixie Carter, it was confirmed that The Blossoms were signed to a contract. Hannah would take part in the One Night Only events, taking part in both Knockout Knockdown and TNA World Cup of Wrestling as part of Team UK. In the Knockout Knockdown event, where she defeated Taeler Hendrix and Sojournor Bolt in a triple threat match advancing to a battle royal which was won by Gail Kim. In the TNA World Cup of Wrestling event, she was defeated by Team International's Lei'D Tapa.

On the 14 November episode of Impact Wrestling, Hannah made her return, answering TNA Women's Knockout Champion Gail Kim's open challenge though in a losing effort.

On 7 January 2014, the twins announced they were taking time off of wrestling, thus announcing their departures from TNA.

== Other media ==
The Blossom Twins made an appearance on A League of Their Own, where they wrestled comedian Micky Flanagan. Lucy's debut romance novel How to Bake a New Beginning was released for pre-orders in September 2018.

== Personal lives ==
Both the Knott twins work as teaching assistants in a primary school in Stockport, Greater Manchester. The twins are known for handing out homemade cupcakes to the audience prior to matches.

Kelly is married to Chris Sharpe. Lucy was married to Chris Silvio, a former OVW wrestler.

== Championships and accomplishments ==
- Ohio Valley Wrestling
  - OVW Women's Championship (4 times) – Hannah (3) and Holly (1)
