= Rebel (wrestler) =

American professional wrestler and manager (born 1978)

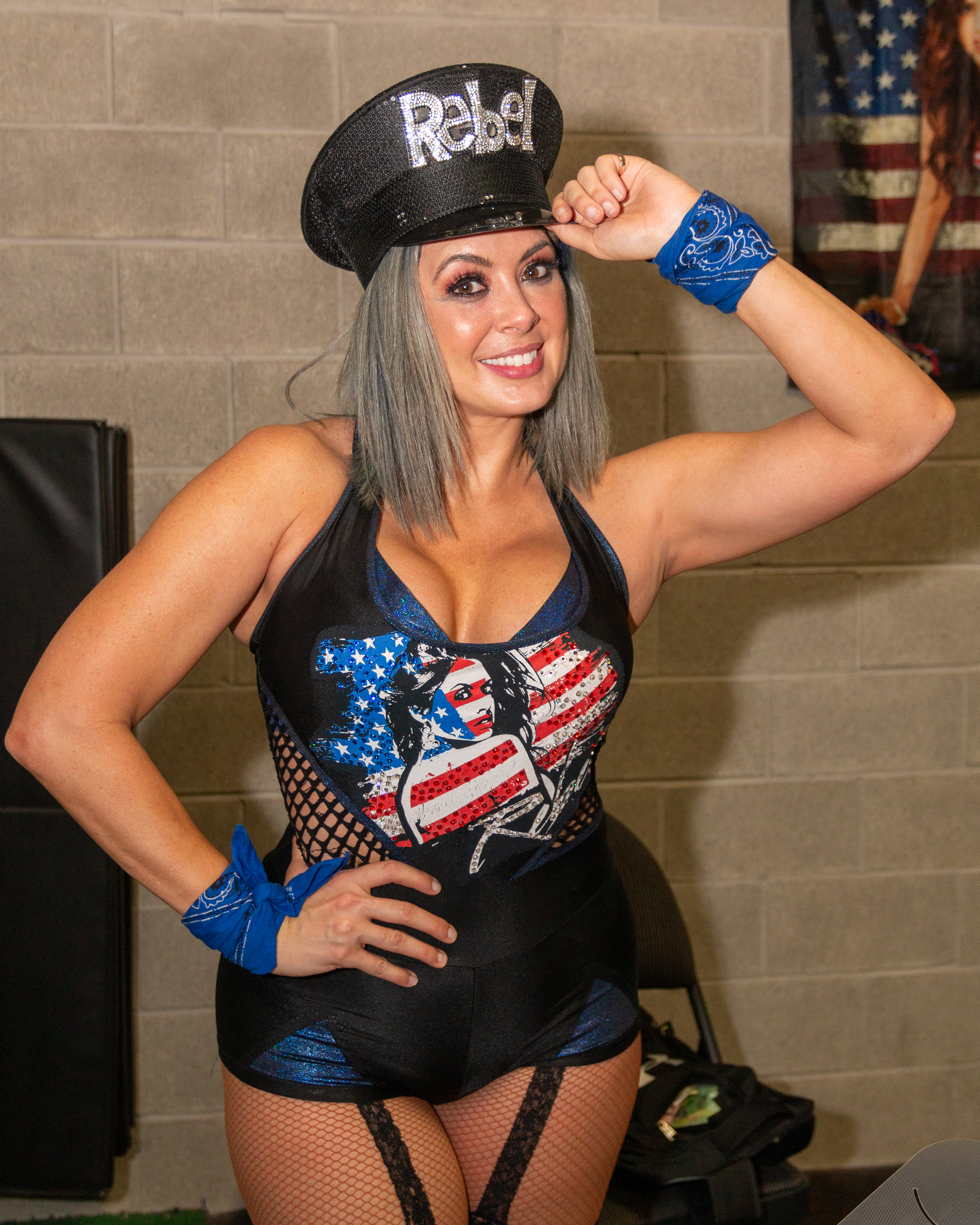
- Rebel in September 2019

Personal information
- Born: Tanea Brooks; September 8, 1978 (age 48) Owasso, Oklahoma, U.S.

Professional wrestling career
- Ring name(s): Rebel; Reba; Tanea Brooks
- Billed height: 5 ft 10 in (1.78 m)
- Billed from: Owasso, Oklahoma
- Trained by: Rip Rogers; Frank Miller; Matt Cappotelli
- Debut: May 8, 2014

Tanea Brooks (born September 8, 1978), better known by the ring name Rebel, is an American professional wrestler. As of 2019, she is signed to All Elite Wrestling (AEW). She is also known for her work in Impact Wrestling.

== Early life ==
Tanea Brooks was born and raised in Owasso, Oklahoma. Brooks became a Dallas Cowboys Cheerleader at age 19 in 1998, after a year as a University of Tulsa dance team member, and remained with the team for three seasons. Brooks also appeared on the cover of the Cheerleaders' swimsuit calendar. Brooks is a longtime friend of wrestling industry veteran Christy Hemme: before either worked in wrestling, Brooks worked in Hemme's "Purrfect Angelz" burlesque dance troupe. Tanea eventually moved to Los Angeles to further her careers in acting, modeling and dancing. Brooks attended the Napoleon Perdis Makeup academy, where she became a licensed cosmetologist. Brooks also played in the Lingerie Football League, on its New York Euphoria team.

== Professional wrestling career ==
=== Total Nonstop Action Wrestling/Impact Wrestling (2013–2016) ===
Brooks was signed to Total Nonstop Action Wrestling in 2013 after long-time friend and former "Purrfect Angelz" member Christy Hemme recommended her. In May 2014, she began appearing as Rebel, a childhood friend and partner of Knux in a carny-themed stable called The Menagerie, also including Crazzy Steve and The Freak. Rebel made her in-ring debut on the September 10 episode of Impact Wrestling, teaming with Crazzy Steve and Knux in six person mixed tag-team match, where they lost to the team of The BroMans (Robbie E and Jessie Godderz) and Velvet Sky. The following episode of Impact Wrestling during a Knockouts battle royal, Rebel legitimately fractured her arm when she landed on the steel steps when Havok knocked her over the top rope. She made her in-ring return on the October 15 episode of Impact Wrestling, defeating Angelina Love and The BroMans. On the following episode, Rebel was scheduled to face Angelina Love in her singles debut on Impact Wrestling, however she was met by Havok who maliciously attacked her. On January 7, 2015, during Impact Wrestling's debut on Destination America, Rebel participated in a battle royal for the TNA Knockouts Championship, however she was the first to be eliminated. After some hiatus, The Menagerie's profile on the TNA website was later moved to the alumni section.

In her first match since The Menagerie split, Rebel teamed with Brooke in a losing effort to The Dollhouse (Jade and Marti Bell) in a tag team match on the May 15 episode of Impact Wrestling. A few weeks later, Rebel was seen in a backstage segment, congratulating Brooke on her winning the TNA Knockouts Championship, only to be attacked by Jade and Marti Bell. On the August 26 episode of Impact Wrestling, Rebel turned heel by attacking Velvet Sky and aligning with The Dollhouse. On January 5, 2016, during Impact Wrestling's debut on POP, Awesome Kong allied with Rebel, Jade and Marti Bell and became the new leader of The Dollhouse after she attacked The Beautiful People (Velvet Sky and Madison Rayne) and Gail Kim. In March 2016, The Dollhouse officially disbanded following Jade's Knockouts Championship reign. On September 14, 2016, Rebel announced her departure from TNA.

=== Ohio Valley Wrestling (2014–2017) ===
In 2014, Brooks began training at Ohio Valley Wrestling. In July, Rebel began competing in OVW dark matches, where she defeated former two-time OVW Women's Champion Jessie Belle, and defeated Mary Elizabeth Monroe on two occasions. Rebel made her televised debut at the Saturday Night Special on August 2, where she once again defeated Monroe. On October 1, Rebel defeated Jessie Belle to become the number one contender for the OVW Women's Championship; however, the match was cut from broadcast as a result of OVW ceasing with women's wrestling at the time.

When OVW was sold to Dean Hill, Rebel returned as the mystery opponent for Jessie Belle on July 11, 2015, on OVW Episode 829, which she won. On July 20 on OVW Episode 830, Rebel was pinned in a triple-threat match by Jessie Belle, which included Ray Lyn. She lost to Jessie Belle the following week in a singles match. On the August 15 edition of OVW Episode 834, Rebel defeated the returning Mary Elizabeth Monroe, however she was attacked by Jessie Belle after the match. On September 3, 2016, OVW Saturday Night Special, Rebel and Paredyse defeated Jessie Belle Smothers and Shane Andrews, then on September 10 Rebel lost a #1 contender's match for the women's title against Jessie Belle.

On November 2, 2016, on OVW Episode 898 Rebel won the OVW Women's Championship, and successfully defended it 1 week later against Callie. On November 16, 2016, Rebel retained the title against ODB. On March 22 Rebel lost the OVW Women's Championship to Madi Maxx.

=== Return to Impact Wrestling (2017, 2018) ===
On March 2, 2017, during the tapings of the episode of Impact Wrestling, Rebel returned to TNA in Knockouts Knockdown 2017, in a losing effort against ODB. On April 6, 2017, during the episode of Impact Wrestling, Rebel participated in a gauntlet match to become number one contender for Rosemary's Knockouts Championship, which she lost. Rebel would return one night only on the July 6, 2017 episode of Impact Wrestling where Rebel lost to Sienna. Another return was made on the June 14, 2018 episode of Impact Wrestling this time losing to Taya Valkyrie. Rebel returned again on the July 5, 2018 episode of Impact Wrestling losing to Katarina.

=== World Wonder Ring Stardom (2017–2018) ===
On April 30, 2017, Rebel made her Japanese debut, performing for one of the world's elite women's wrestling companies: World Wonder Ring Stardom. During her 8-week tour of Japan, Brooks worked with some of the most respected women wrestlers in the world. For instance, Brooks' first Stardom match was in its 2017 Cinderella Tournament, against eventual tournament winner and Stardom world champion, Toni Storm. on May 3, Rebel, Jessicka Havok and Tessa Blanchard defeated Hiroyo Matsumoto, Jungle Kyona and Natsuko Tora. on May 6, Rebel and Hiroyo Matsumoto defeated Hetzza and Kaori Yoneyama. on May 7, Rebel lost a 3-way match to Hana Kimura, a rising young star in the company. on May 14, Rebel lost another 3-way match, this time to HZK, another young star and future Stardom world champion. on May 20, Rebel lost another 3-way match to Kimura. on May 21, Rebel lost to Io Shirai, arguably the world's best woman wrestler at the time, and a record-setting holder of multiple Stardom titles. on June 4 Rebel lost again to Kimura. on June 11, Rebel and Shanna defeated Hiromi Mimura and Konami. on June 17, Rebel lost another 3-way match to Kimura. on June 21, Rebel and Team Jungle (Kaori Yoneyama and Natsuko Tora) lost a six-woman tag team match to Hiromi Mimura, Konami and Yoko Bito.

=== Return to OVW (2017–2019) ===
Rebel returned to OVW on the August 5, 2017 on OVW Saturday Night Special - War Zone, Rebel competed in a fatal-four way steel cage match against Cali, Mickie Knuckles and Paredyse, which was won by Cali. In November 2018, Rebel injured Indian Actress Rakhi Sawant by grabbing her in inverse position, circulating her, and throwing her on her back. It injured Sawant's back and she fell unconscious, and was later carried to a nearby hospital. On September 23 at the OVW Matt Cappotelli Benefit Show, she defeated Cali, Jaylee and Torey Payne in a fatal-four-way match.

On August 4, 2018, at OVW Saturday Night Special , Rebel unsuccessfully challenged Jaylee for the OVW Women's Championship. The match ended in a double count out.

=== World Wrestling Entertainment (2019) ===
Brooks appeared as herself on the January 23, 2019 edition of WWE's NXT TV show, teaming with Amber Nova in a tag team loss to Kairi Sane and Io Shirai.

=== All Elite Wrestling (2019–present) ===
In August 2019, Wrestling Observer Newsletter reported that All Elite Wrestling (AEW) had hired Brooks for a backstage role: hair and makeup stylist for their women wrestlers. However, on the April 29, 2020 episode of AEW Dynamite (AEW's flagship TV show), Brooks appeared onscreen as Rebel, as the personal makeup artist and assistant to Dr. Britt Baker, D.M.D., who kept incorrectly calling her "Reba". Rebel also had two matches (as an enhancement talent) against Big Swole—both quick losses. Brooks would continue to appear alongside Baker until on June 30, 2021, she suffered a dislocated knee cap injury in a match facing Nyla Rose and Vickie Guerrero. Rebel returned to in-ring action in 2022 on Dark: Elevation with her last televised match being on June 20, 2022, losing to Anna Jay.

As of 2026, Rebel remains under AEW contract while dealing with her health, which she later revealed was an ALS diagnosis. On September 9, 2026, AEW hosted the Rebel Heart special episode of Dynamite to benefit Rebel in her battle against ALS and raise awareness for the disease. During the show, she made her first televised appearance in over four years, now using a motorized wheelchair, as part of The Waiting Room segment with Britt Baker and later assisted Baker in winning a six-woman tag team match.

== Personal life ==
In November 2025, Brooks announced she had been diagnosed with primary pulmonary lymphoma. While undergoing treatment for her lymphoma, Brooks was also diagnosed with amyotrophic lateral sclerosis in May 2026, having experienced symptoms for the last two years.

== Other media ==
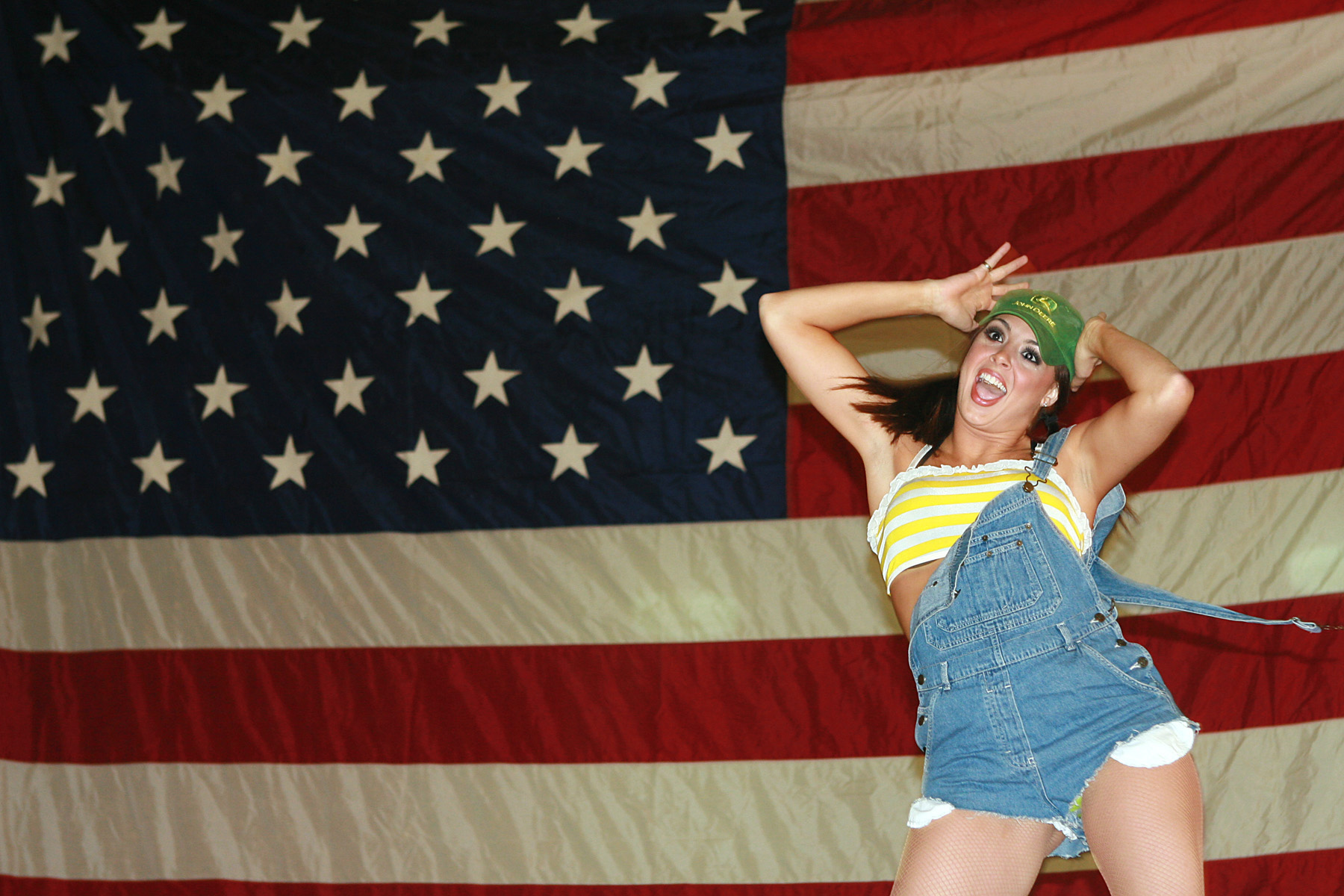
Rebel in November 2007

Brooks was cast as the lead "badonkadonk" girl in Trace Adkins' "Honky Tonk Badonkadonk" music video. Brooks also performed as a backup dancer in Adkins' live performances of the song at the CMT Music Awards and Academy of Country Music Awards (ACMA) shows. Brooks appeared in another country music video, for Brooks and Dunn's song, "Play Something Country". Brooks was cast as one of the "homewrecker"s (female dancers performing in between sketches) on Jeff Foxworthy's Foxworthy's Big Night Out TV show. In 2002, Brooks made her acting debut in the short film Sweet Friggin' Daisies. She also appeared in the reality television series Full Throttle Saloon, making guest-starring appearances spanning 3 seasons. Brooks played "Teresa Tomkins" in the 2010 short film Hello. In 2011, Brooks appeared in the "Mufasa and Tucker" episode of Dog Whisperer with Cesar Millan.

== Championships and accomplishments ==
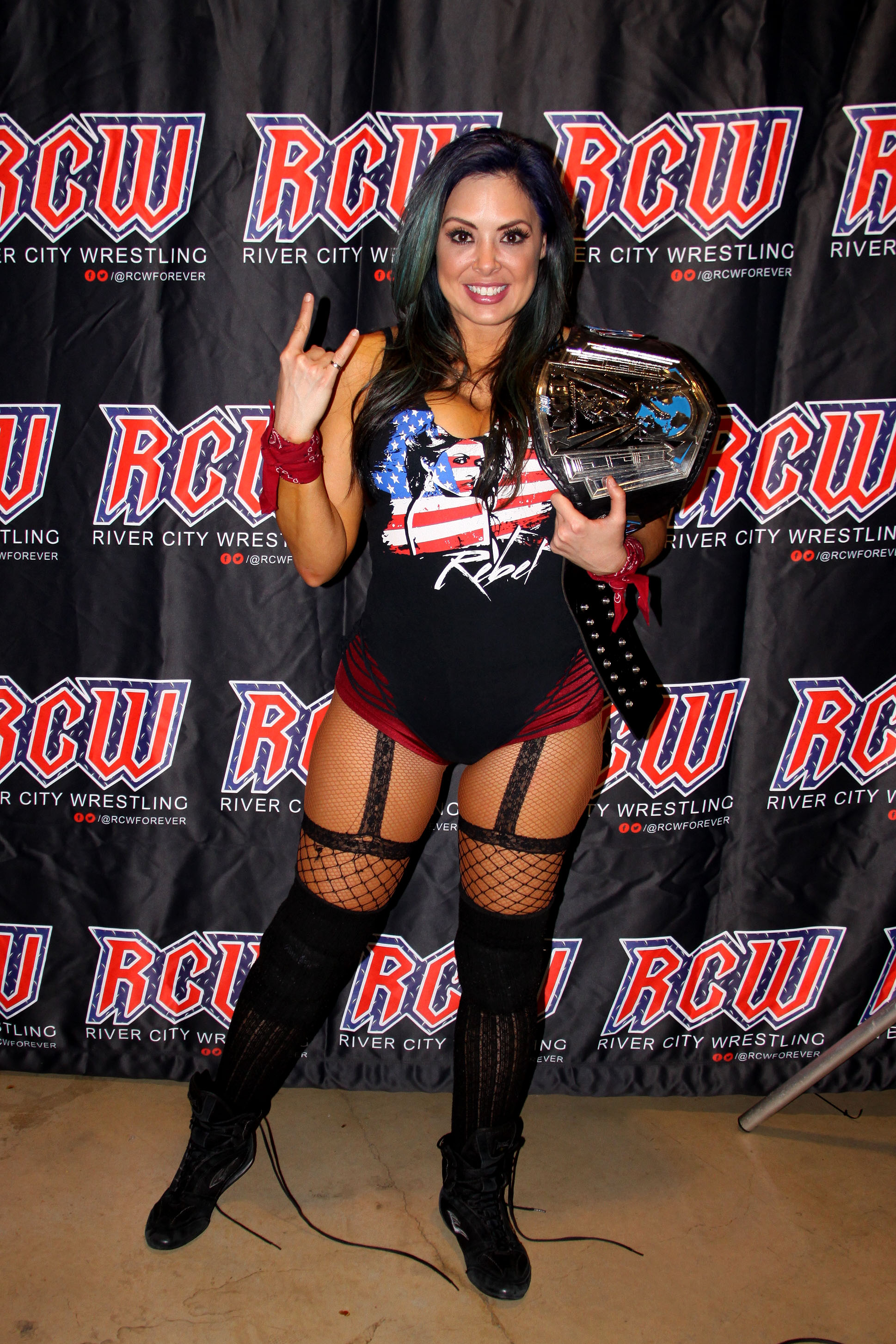
Rebel as RCW Women's Champion

- Ohio Valley Wrestling
  - OVW Women's Championship (1 time)
- Pro Wrestling Illustrated
  - PWI ranked her No. 49 of the best 50 female singles wrestlers in the PWI Female 50 in 2017
- River City Wrestling
  - RCW Women's Championship (1 time)
  - RCW Honors (2026)
- Tried-N-True Pro Wrestling
  - Tried-N-True Women's Championship (1 time)
- Wrestling Observer Newsletter
  - Worst Match of the Year (2016) vs. Shelly Martinez at Knockouts Knockdown 2016
