= OVW Women's Championship =

Professional wrestling women's championship

Details
- Promotion: Ohio Valley Wrestling
- Date established: July 12, 2006
- Current champion: J-Rod
- Date won: October 18, 2026
Statistics
- First champion: ODB
- Most reigns: Jessie Belle (11 reigns)
- Longest reign: Josie/Lady JoJo (343 days)
- Shortest reign: Josie, Reggie, The Baroness, Jessie Belle, Scarlet, and Maria James (<1 day)
- Oldest champion: Rebel (38 years old)
- Youngest champion: Madi Maxx (19 years old)
- Heaviest champion: Lei'D Tapa; 218 lb (99 kg)
- Lightest champion: Roucka; 115 lb (52 kg)

The OVW Women's Championship is a women's professional wrestling world championship in Ohio Valley Wrestling (OVW). The first holder of the title was ODB, who declared herself champion in August 2006. The belt was defended as any other championship in professional wrestling until Serena Deeb declared she would defend the belt under 24/7 rules in May 2008. These rules lasted until Melody won the belt in November 2008.

Jessie Belle holds the record for most reigns, with eleven and at 343 days, Josie/Lady JoJo sixth reign is the longest in the title's history. Reggie and The Baroness' first and only reigns are the shortest in the title's history at less than a day. The Bodyguy is the first and only male to hold the title. Overall, there have been 103 reigns shared among 48 wrestlers, with eight vacancies. The current champion is J-Rod who is in her third reign.

== History ==
Its initial appearance was at OVW's July 12, 2006 television taping, when ODB appeared with a title belt, claiming she had won it in a tournament in Rio de Janeiro, Brazil (a nod to World Wrestling Entertainment kayfabe stating that the WWE Championship and WWE Intercontinental Championship originated in tournaments in Rio de Janeiro). It was not recognized as an official OVW title originally, but after ODB began defending it on a regular basis it became an official title, and has since been won by other women.

On May 23, 2008, after winning the title for the second time, Serena Deeb proclaimed that she would defend the OVW Women's Championship at all times as long as a referee was present. This new "24/7 rule", which was a nod to the WWE Hardcore Championship, became an official part of the championship and was effectively utilized by several OVW Divas, including Deeb herself. The rule came to an end on November 12 after Melody won the title from Deeb during a fatal four-way match.

After being vacated for one year, Jessie Belle won a battle royal at OVW's Brews and Bruises event on November 21, 2015, to win the championship for the third time.

In early July 2016, it was announced that the Championship would be contested under 24/7 rules, with the title even changing hands outside of TV shows or live events. Things could soon revert to normal held rules on August 17, 2016, when Maria James won the Women's Championship back for the sixth time.

== Reigns ==
As of November 10, 2026, there have been 103 reigns between 48 champions and seven vacancies. ODB was the inaugural champion. Lady JoJo's sixth reign is the longest at 343 days, while JoJo's third reign, alongside The Baroness, Jessie Belle's sixth, seventh, ninth and tenth reigns, Maria James' third–fifth reigns are the shortest lasting less than a day. Belle has the most reigns at 11 times. Rebel is the oldest champion at 38 years old, while Madi Maxx is the youngest at 19 years old. The Bodyguy is the first male wrestler to hold the title.

J-Rod is the current champion in her third reign.

Key
No.	Overall reign number
Reign	Reign number for the specific champion
Days	Number of days held
†	Championship change is unrecognized by the promotion
<1	Reign lasted less than a day
+	Current reign is changing daily

No.	Champion	Championship change			Reign statistics		Notes	Ref.
No.	Champion	Date	Event	Location	Reign	Days	Notes	Ref.
1	ODB	July 12, 2006	Live event	Rio de Janeiro, Brazil	1	63	Appointed herself the inaugural champion.	
2	Serena	September 13, 2006	OVW TV Tapings	Louisville, KY	1	21	This was a fatal four-way match, also involving Beth Phoenix and Katie Lea.	
3	Beth Phoenix	October 4, 2006	OVW TV Tapings	Louisville, KY	1	28		
†	Victoria Crawford	October 20, 2006	House show	Hodgenville, KY	—	1	Won the title in a Gauntlet match. This reign is not officially recognized by OVW.	
†	Beth Phoenix	October 21, 2006	House show	Elizabethtown, KY	—	11	It was an 8-woman elimination match also including Ariel, Katie Lea, Melody, ODB, Roni Jonah, and Serena. This reign is not officially recognized by OVW, and the company recognizes the period from Phoenix's first title win to her second title loss as one uninterrupted reign.	
4	Katie Lea	November 1, 2006	OVW TV Tapings	Louisville, KY	1	212	Lea defeated Serena in the finals of an eight-woman gauntlet match.	
5	ODB	June 1, 2007	OVW Six Flags Show	Louisville, KY	2	110		
6	Roucka	September 19, 2007	OVW TV Tapings	Louisville, KY	1	154	This was a six-way match also involving, Josie, Katie Lea, Melody and Serena.	
7	Katie Lea	February 20, 2008	OVW TV Tapings	Louisville, KY	2	7		
8	Josie	February 27, 2008	OVW TV Tapings	Louisville, KY	1	86	Josie became the first OVW Women's Champion since OVW and WWE parted ways.	
9	Serena	May 23, 2008	OVW Six Flags Show	Louisville, KY	2	40		
10	Josie	July 2, 2008	OVW TV Tapings	Louisville, KY	2	<1		
11	Serena	July 2, 2008	OVW TV Tapings	Louisville, KY	3	14		
†	Melody (1) and Josie (3)	July 16, 2008	OVW TV Tapings	Louisville, KY	1	<1	Both Josie and Melody attacked Serena to win the Women's Championship; however, the title change is not recognized by OVW.	
12	Reggie	July 16, 2008	OVW TV Tapings	Louisville, KY	1	<1	This was a four corners match, also involving Serena.	
13	Serena	July 16, 2008	OVW TV Tapings	Louisville, KY	4	8	Serena pinned Reggie immediately after she won the title to become the new champion.	
14	The Baroness	July 24, 2008	DCW TV Tapings	Louisville, KY	1	<1	This was a three-way match, also involving Josie.	
15	Serena	July 24, 2008	DCW TV Tapings	Louisville, KY	5	7		
16	Josie	July 31, 2008	DCW TV Tapings	Louisville, KY	3	7		
17	Serena	August 7, 2008	DCW TV Tapings	Louisville, KY	6	97		
18	Melody	November 12, 2008	OVW TV Tapings	Louisville, KY	1	273	This was a four-way match, also involving Josie and Reggie.	
19	Epiphany	August 12, 2009	OVW TV Tapings	Louisville, KY	1	56		
20	Hannah Blossom	October 7, 2009	OVW TV Tapings	Louisville, KY	1	52	Holly Blossom made the roll up after switching with her twin sister Hannah without the referee looking. Only Hannah was recognized as the champion.	
21	Josie	November 28, 2009	OVW Thanksgiving Thunder	Louisville, KY	4	4		
22	Hannah Blossom	December 2, 2009	OVW TV Tapings	Louisville, KY	2	14	Title awarded back to Hannah Blossom after a review of match footage by the OVW board of directors showing that Josie pinned Holly Blossom who was not her legal opponent.	
23	Josie	December 16, 2009	OVW TV Tapings	Louisville, KY	5	101		
24	C.J. Lane	March 27, 2010	OVW Riot Act	Louisville, KY	1	91		
25	Taryn Shay	June 26, 2010	OVW Trial by Fire	Louisville, KY	1	35	Epiphany was the opponent for the match, but Taryn Shay replaced her as Epiphany wasn't medically cleared to wrestle.	
26	Holly Blossom	July 31, 2010	OVW Futureshock 2	Louisville, KY	1	28		
27	Lady JoJo	August 28, 2010	OVW Summer Scorcher	Louisville, KY	6	343	JoJo was originally known as Josie	
28	Izza Belle Smothers	August 6, 2011	OVW Saturday Night Special	Louisville, KY	1	18		
29	Lady JoJo	August 24, 2011	OVW TV Tapings	Louisville, KY	7	80		
30	Taeler Hendrix	November 12, 2011	OVW Saturday Night Special	Louisville, KY	1	203	Hendrix became the first OVW Women's Champion since OVW became the developmental territory to TNA Wrestling.	
31	Epiphany	June 2, 2012	OVW Saturday Night Special	Louisville, KY	2	28		
—	Vacated	June 27, 2012	OVW TV Tapings	Louisville, KY	—	—	The championship was vacated by OVW Board of Directors member Ken Wayne.	
32	Taeler Hendrix	July 7, 2012	OVW Saturday Night Special	Louisville, KY	2	70	Hendrix defeated Epiphany in an evening gown match to win the vacant title. With the win, Hendrix became the first TNA Knockout to win the championship.	
33	Heidi Lovelace	September 15, 2012	Live Event	Elizabethtown, KY	1	60		
34	Taryn Terrell	November 14, 2012	OVW TV Tapings	Louisville, KY	1	17	Taeler Hendrix served as the special guest referee.	
35	Taeler Hendrix	December 1, 2012	OVW Saturday Night Special	Louisville, KY	3	35		
36	Jessie Belle	January 5, 2013	OVW Saturday Night Special	Louisville, KY	1	56		
37	Epiphany	March 2, 2013	OVW Saturday Night Special	Louisville, KY	3	46		
38	Trina Thompson	April 17, 2013	OVW TV Tapings	Louisville, KY	1	141		
—	Vacated	September 5, 2013	OVW TV Tapings	Louisville, KY	—	—	The championship was vacated due to Trina Thompson suffering an injury.	
39	Hannah Blossom	September 18, 2013	OVW TV Tapings	Louisville, KY	3	17	This was a fatal four-way ladder match, also involving Holly Blossom, Lei'D Tapa and Taeler Hendrix.	
40	Lei'D Tapa	October 5, 2013	OVW Saturday Night Special	Louisville, KY	1	63	Tapa became the first champion since OVW and TNA parted ways.	
41	The Bodyguy	December 7, 2013	OVW Saturday Night Special	Louisville, KY	1	28	The Bodyguy became the first male wrestler to hold the championship.	
42	Lei'D Tapa	January 4, 2014	OVW Saturday Night Special	Louisville, KY	2	56	The Bodyguy was scheduled to face The Assassin but Lei'D Tapa replaced him for undisclosed reasons.	
43	Jessie Belle	March 1, 2014	OVW Saturday Night Special	Louisville, KY	2	36		
44	Lei'D Tapa	April 6, 2014	OVW Sunday Night Special	Louisville, KY	3	209		
—	Vacated	November 1, 2014	OVW Saturday Night Special	Louisville, KY	—	—	OVW declared on their site that the title was vacated due to their women's division discontinuing at the time.	
45	Jessie Belle	November 21, 2015	OVW: Brews and Bruises	Louisville, KY	3	77	Belle defeated The Amazing Grace, Hanna, Luscious Lexie, Lucy Blossom, Maria James, ODB, Ray Lyn, Rebel and Taeler Hendrix in a ten-woman battle royal to win the vacant championship.	
46	Maria James	February 6, 2016	OVW Saturday Night Special	Louisville, KY	1	35		
47	Jessie Belle	March 12, 2016	Live Event	Bardstown, KY	4	63		
48	Scarlet	May 14, 2016	OVW Saturday Night Special	Louisville, KY	1	49		
49	Jessie Belle	July 2, 2016	Saturday Night Special Anarchy	Louisville, KY	5	11	This was a four-way match, also including Deonna Purrazzo and Maria James.	
50	Maria James	July 13, 2016	OVW TV Tapings	Louisville, KY	2	7	Due to the new 24/7 rules, the match wasn't seen by the live audience.	
51	Jessie Belle	July 20, 2016	OVW TV Tapings	Louisville, KY	6	<1		
52	Scarlet	July 20, 2016	OVW TV Tapings	Louisville, KY	2	<1		
53	Jessie Belle	July 20, 2016	OVW TV Tapings	Louisville, KY	7	<1		
54	Maria James	July 20, 2016	OVW TV Tapings	Louisville, KY	3	<1		
55	Jessie Belle	July 20, 2016	OVW TV Tapings	Louisville, KY	8	7		
56	Maria James	July 27, 2016	OVW TV Tapings	Louisville, KY	4	<1		
57	Jessie Belle	July 27, 2016	OVW TV Tapings	Louisville, KY	9	<1		
58	Izza Belle Smothers	July 27, 2016	OVW TV Tapings	Louisville, KY	2	7		
59	Jessie Belle	August 3, 2016	OVW TV Tapings	Louisville, KY	10	<1		
60	Maria James	August 3, 2016	OVW TV Tapings	Louisville, KY	5	<1		
61	Jessie Belle	August 3, 2016	OVW TV Tapings	Louisville, KY	11	<1		
62	Jamie Lynn	August 3, 2016	OVW TV Tapings	Louisville, KY	1	14		
63	Maria James	August 17, 2016	OVW TV Tapings	Louisville, KY	6	77		
64	Rebel	November 2, 2016	OVW TV Tapings	Louisville, KY	1	140	Randy Royal served as the special guest referee.	
65	Madi Maxx	March 22, 2017	OVW TV Tapings	Louisville, KY	1	52		
66	Cali	May 13, 2017	OVW Saturday Night Special	Louisville, KY	1	49	This was a Loser Leaves Town match.	
67	Mickie Knuckles	July 1, 2017	OVW Saturday Night Special	Louisville, KY	3	60	This was a "Mickie's playhouse" match. Knuckles previously known as Izza Belle Smothers.	
—	Vacated	August 30, 2017	OVW TV Tapings	Louisville, KY	—	—	The championship was vacated due to personal problems.	
68	Jaylee	September 2, 2017	OVW Saturday Night Special	Louisville, KY	1	252	Jaylee defeated Cali to win the vacant championship.	
69	Cali	May 12, 2018	OVW Saturday Night Special	Louisville, KY	2	56		
70	Jaylee	July 7, 2018	OVW Saturday Night Special	Louisville, KY	2	160	This was a submission match.	
71	Brittany Devore	December 14, 2018	OVW Christmas Chaos 2018	Louisville, KY	1	56		
72	Jaylee	February 8, 2019	OVW Friday Night Special	Louisville, KY	3	5	This was a four-way match, also including Cali and Valerie Verman.	
73	Cali Young	February 13, 2019	OVW TV Tapings	Louisville, KY	3	108	Previously went under the name Cali.	
74	Megan Bayne	June 1, 2019	OVW Saturday Night Special	Louisville, KY	1	150	This was a three-way match, also including Madi Maxx.	
75	Max the Impaler	October 29, 2019	OVW TV Tapings	Louisville, KY	1	95		
76	Ray Lyn	February 1, 2020	OVW Saturday Night Special	Louisville, KY	1	17		
77	Madison Rayne	February 18, 2020	OVW TV Tapings	Louisville, KY	1	182	This was a five-way match, also involving Cali Young, Max the Impaler and Megan Bayne.	
—	Vacated	August 18, 2020	OVW TV Tapings	Jeffersonville, IN	—	—	The title was vacated by OVW due to Madison Rayne not being there to defend the championship.	
78	Kayla Kassidy	August 18, 2020	OVW TV Tapings	Jeffersonville, IN	1	35	This was five-way match, also involving Alice Crowley, Becky Idol, Billie Starkz and Haley J.	
—	Vacated	September 22, 2020	OVW TV Tapings	Louisville, KY	—	—	The title was vacated by OVW due to Kayla Kassidy suffering a concussion and not being able to defend the championship.	
79	Mazzerati	September 22, 2020	OVW TV	Louisville, KY	1	140	This was five-way match, also involving Haley J, Joseline Navarro, Salena Dean and Sarah the Rebel.	
80	Hollyhood Haley J	February 9, 2021	OVW TV	Louisville, KY	1	137		
81	Dani Mo	June 26, 2021	OVW Saturday Night Special - Chained Carnage 2021	Louisville, KY	1	5		
82	Hollyhood Haley J	July 1, 2021	OVW TV	Louisville, KY	2	42		
—	Vacated	August 12, 2021	OVW TV Tapings	Louisville, KY	—	—	OVW stripped Haley J of the championship	
83	Sierra	August 28, 2021	OVW Saturday Night Special - Reckoning 2021	Louisville, KY	1	110	Defeated Dani Mo to win the vacant title.	
84	Freya the Slaya	December 16, 2021	OVW Christmas Chaos 2021	Louisville, KY	1	119		
85	Leila Grey	April 14, 2022	OVW TV	Louisville, KY	1	114		
86	Freya the Slaya	August 6, 2022	Saturday Night Special - Saturday Night Riot	Louisville, KY	2	21		
87	Leila Grey	August 27, 2022	OVW The Big One	Louisville, KY	2	63		
88	Shalonce Royal	October 29, 2022	Saturday Night Special - No Rest for the Wicked	Louisville, KY	1	208		
89	Haley J	May 25, 2023	OVW TV: All Systems Go	Louisville, KY	3	133	Previously went under the name Hollyhood Haley J.	
90	Tiffany Nieves	October 5, 2023	OVW TV	Louisville, KY	1	72	If Haley J was disqualified, she would lose the title per the stipulation. J was disqualified, therefore Nieves was crowned the new champion.	
91	Freya the Slaya	December 16, 2023	OVW Christmas Chaos 2023	Louisville, KY	3	56	Haley J served as the special guest referee.	
92	Leila Grey	February 10, 2024	Saturday Night Special - Tough Love 2024	Louisville, KY	3	201		
93	J-Rod	August 29, 2024	OVW Rise HOMECOMING	Louisville, KY	1	212		
94	Sophia Rose	March 29, 2025	OVW March Mayhem 2025	Louisville, KY	1	94		
95	Freya the Slaya	July 1, 2025	Independence Rage 2025	Louisville, KY	4	173		
96	Leela Feist	December 21, 2025	OVW Christmas Chaos 2025	Louisville, KY	1	84		
97	Shalonce Royal	March 15, 2026	OVW March Mayhem 2026	Louisville, KY	2	63	This was a fatal four-way match also involving Freya the Slaya and Lovely Miss Larkin.	
98	Dayami	May 17, 2026	OVW Collision Course 2026	Louisville, KY	1	4		
—	Vacated	May 21, 2026	OVW Rise	Louisville, KY	—	—	Dayami was forced to relinquish the title due to her work visa expiring.	
99	Lovely Miss Larkan	June 11, 2026	OVW TV	Louisville, KY	1	38	Defeated Shalonce Royal for the vacant title.	
100	J-Rod	July 19, 2026	Independence Rage 2026	Louisville, KY	2	46		
101	Shalonce Royal	September 3, 2026	OVW TV	Louisville, KY	3	9		
102	Dayami	September 12, 2026	OVW Countdown To Fight Night	Louisville, KY	2	36	This was a no disqualification match.	
103	J-Rod	October 18, 2026	OVW Hell Night 2026	Louisville, KY	3	23+		

== Combined reigns ==
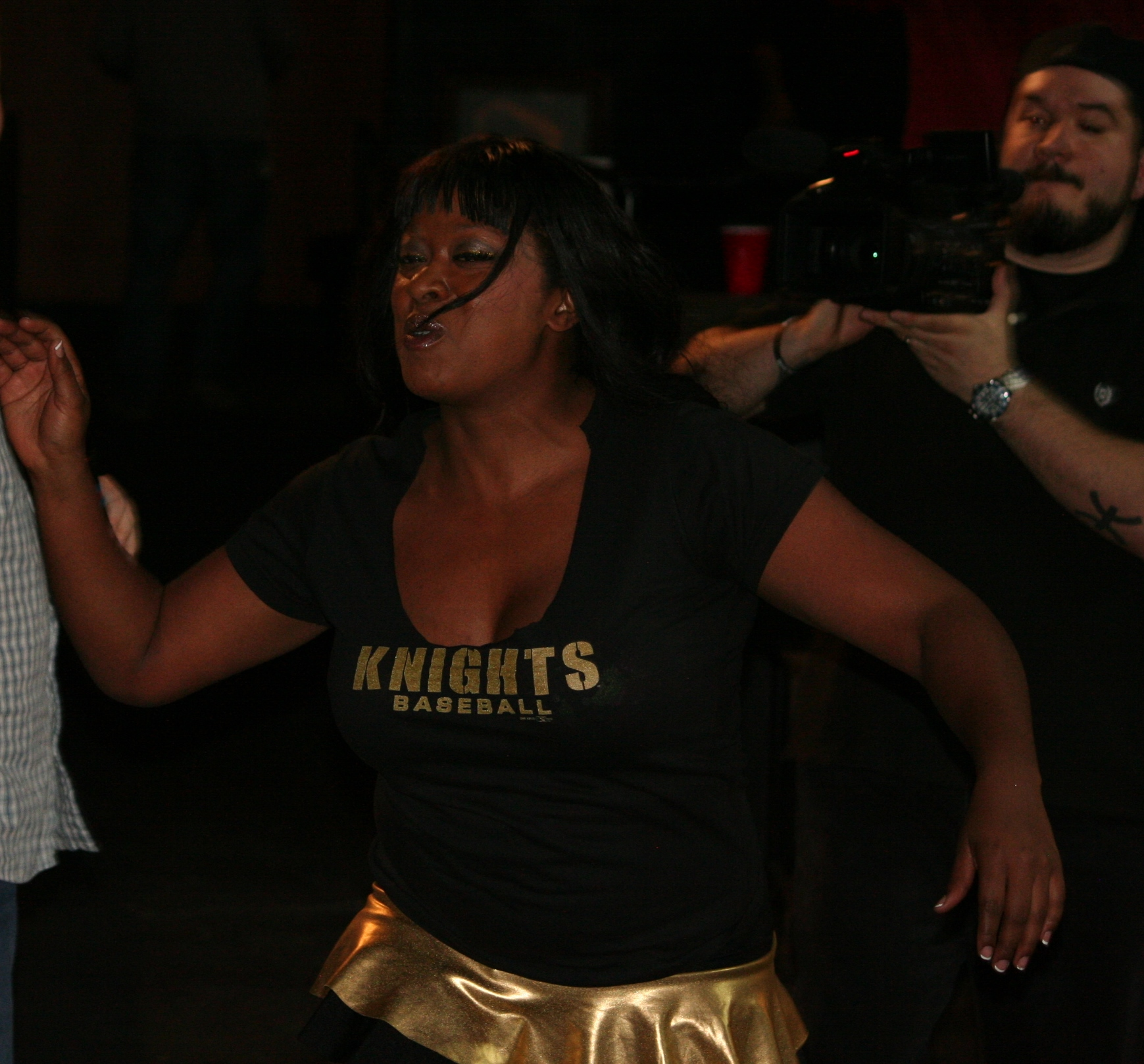
Josie/Lady JoJo — 7 times OVW Women's Champion, who also holds the longest reign

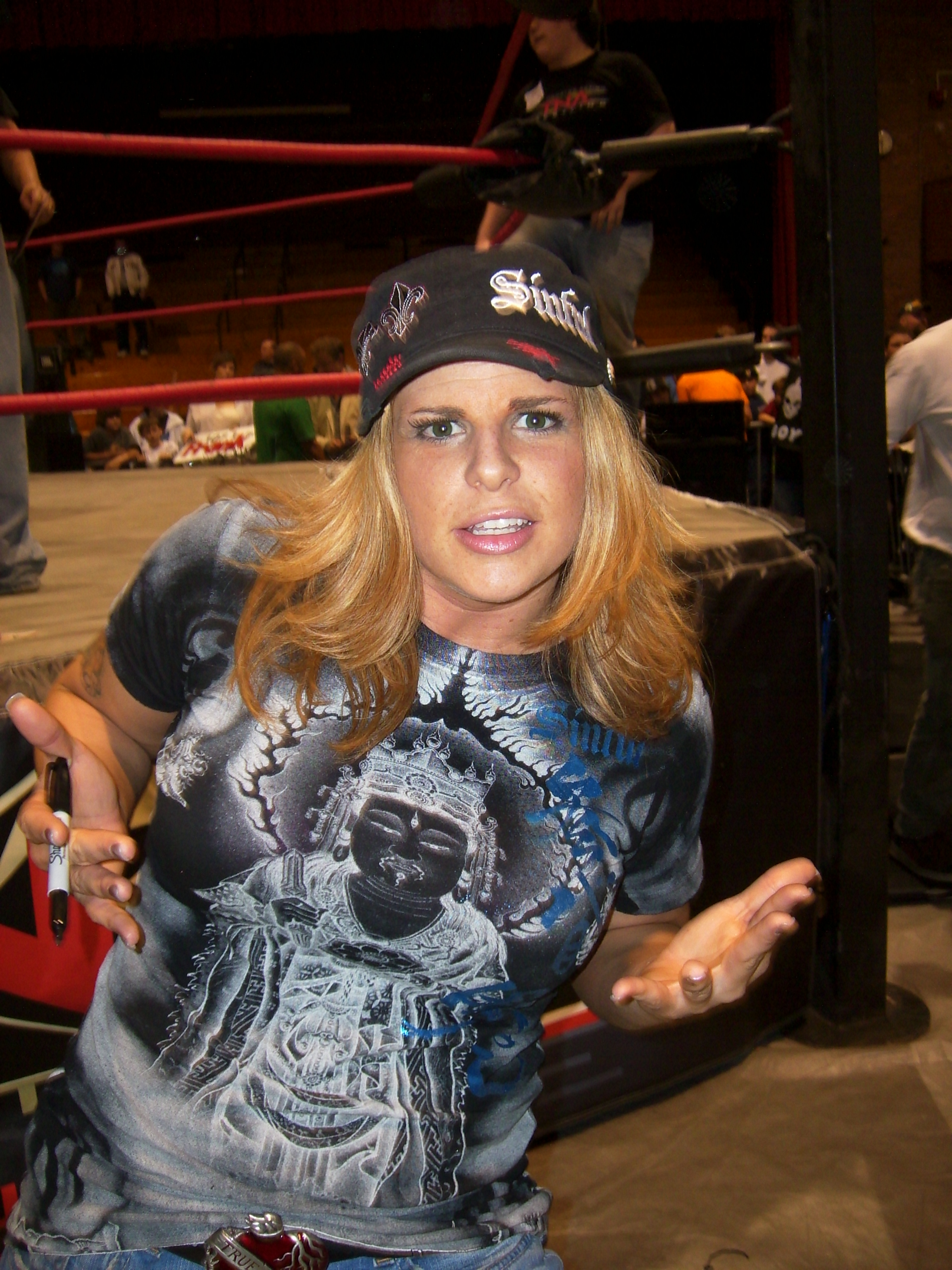
ODB — the inaugural and two times OVW Women's Champion

As of November 10, 2026.

†	Indicates the current champion

Rank	Wrestler	No. of reigns	Combined days
1	Josie/Lady JoJo	7	621
2	Jaylee	3	417
3	Leila Grey	3	378
4	Freya the Slaya	4	369
5	Lei'D Tapa	3	328
6	Haley J/Hollyhood Haley J	3	312
7	Taeler Hendrix	3	308
8	J-Rod †	3	281+
9	Shalonce Royal	3	280
10	Melody	1	273
11	Jessie Belle	11	250
12	Katie Lea	2	219
13	Cali/Cali Young	3	213
14	Serena	6	187
15	Madison Rayne	1	182
16	ODB	2	173
17	Roucka	1	154
18	Megan Bayne	1	150
19	Trina Thompson	1	141
20	Mazzerati	1	140
20	Rebel	1	140
22	Epiphany	3	130
23	Maria James	6	119
24	Sierra	1	110
25	Max the Impaler	1	95
26	Sophia Rose	1	94
27	C.J. Lane	1	91
28	Izza Belle Smothers/Mickie Knuckles	3	85
29	Leela Feist	1	84
30	Hannah Blossom	3	83
31	Tiffany Nieves	1	72
32	Heidi Lovelace	1	60
33	Brittany Devore	1	56
34	Madi Maxx	1	52
35	Scarlet	2	49
36	Dayami	2	40
37	Lovely Miss Larkan	1	38
38	Kayla Kassidy	1	35
38	Taryn Shay	1	35
40	Beth Phoenix	1	28
40	The Bodyguy	1	28
40	Holly Blossom	1	28
43	Ray Lyn	1	17
43	Taryn Terrell	1	17
45	Jamie Lynn	1	14
46	Dani Mo	1	5
47	The Baroness	1	<1
47	Reggie	1	<1
