= Sojournor Bolt =

American professional wrestler (born 1977)

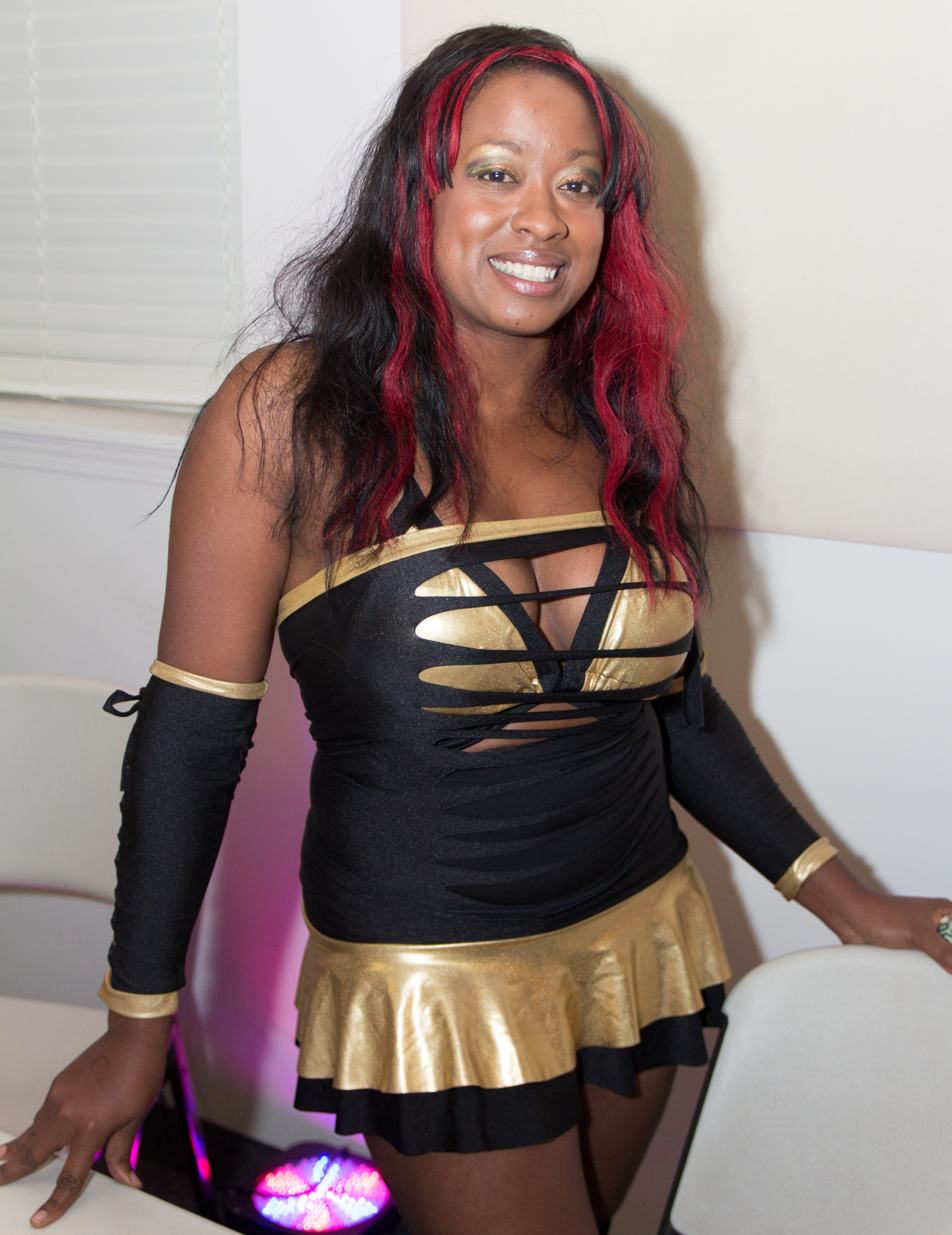
- Bynum as Sojo Bolt at an independent wrestling show in August 2013

Personal information
- Born: Josette Bynum; September 11, 1977 (age 49) Minneapolis, Minnesota, U.S.

Professional wrestling career
- Ring name(s): Josette Bynum; CoCo Montego; Josie; Josie Robinson; Lady JoJo; Miss Josie; Sojo Bolt; Sojourner Bolt; Sojournor Bolt
- Billed height: 5 ft 4 in (163 cm)
- Billed weight: 140 lb (64 kg)
- Billed from: Chicago, Illinois; Minneapolis, Minnesota; Memphis, Tennessee
- Trained by: Eddie Sharkey; Eric Priest; Rip Rogers
- Debut: April 3, 2003
- Retired: November 30, 2014

Josette Bynum (born September 11, 1977) is an American retired professional wrestler and promoter. Bynum is best known for her stint in Total Nonstop Action Wrestling under the name Sojournor Bolt (or "Sojo Bolt" for short). She is also known for her time in both Ohio Valley Wrestling and Shimmer Women Athletes. As of 2011, in Ohio Valley Wrestling she holds the record for most reigns with seven and longest reign - 621 days in the OVW Women's Championship history. She opened her own professional wrestling promotion in 2014, Queens of Combat.

== Professional wrestling career ==
=== Early career (2003–2008) ===
Bynum made her professional wrestling debut on April 3, 2003, and began regularly wrestling for Ohio Valley Wrestling, where she had a notable feud with Serena Deeb over the company's Women's Championship. Both Deeb and Bynum exchanged the title during the feud, with Bynum becoming a four time OVW Women's Champion.

On July 23, 2005, 3XW, Josie defeated Annthraxx to win the 3XW Women's title for the first time. She re-lost the title to Annthraxx on November 19. She made her debut for the World League Wrestling promotion on November 12, defeating Wonderful Wendy. Josie remained undefeated against ODB, Malia Hosaka and other wrestlers. On March 24, 2007, Josie unsuccessfully challenged MsChif for the NWA Women's Championship.

In December 2008, Bynum competed in her last match for OVW, which was a losing effort to Reggie, due to her signing a contract with Total Nonstop Action Wrestling.

=== Total Nonstop Action Wrestling (2008–2009, 2013) ===
At Slammiversary, then-Knockout Champion Awesome Kong was challenged by Bynum, under the name Josie Robinson, and fellow OVW regular Serena Deeb, with the winner claiming both Kong's $25,000 prize and her Women's Championship. However, both were subsequently defeated in consecutive matches. Bynum returned to TNA on the August 28, 2008 episode of Impact! under the ring name Sojournor Bolt and was defeated by Awesome Kong. On October 12, Bynum, again under the Sojournor Bolt name, took part in a dark match at Bound for Glory IV, where she and Eric Young defeated Christy Hemme and Lance Rock. On the November 20 episode of Impact!, she teamed up with Hemme and was defeated by Angelina Love and Velvet Sky. On December 3, it was announced that TNA had signed Bynum to a contract. On the December 11 of Impact! she was defeated by Christy Hemme. After the match the two women brawled and Bolt became a villain. On the December 25 edition of Impact!, Bolt teamed with Awesome Kong, Rhaka Khan, and Raisha Saeed in a losing effort to the team of Christy Hemme, ODB, Roxxi, and Taylor Wilde.

On the January 8, 2009 edition of Impact!, she, along with Raisha Saeed and Rhaka Khan, accompanied Awesome Kong to the ring for her match against Madison Rayne. At Genesis, Bolt teamed up with Khan and Saeed to form a faction known as the Kongtourage. The Kongtourage was defeated by ODB, Taylor Wilde and Roxxi, however. On the next Impact!, she again teamed with Saeed and Khan in a losing effort to ODB, Taylor Wilde and Roxxi. On the January 22 edition of Impact!, Bolt lost to ODB after via disqualification due to the Kongtourage interfering. On the January 28 edition of Impact!, she competed in a handicap match as she, Rhaka Khan, Raisha Saeed and Awesome Kong defeated ODB. On February 12, 2009, she won a gauntlet battle royal defeating Madison Rayne, ODB, Roxxi, Velvet Sky, Taylor Wilde, Angelina Love, Raisha Saeed, and Rhaka Khan to receive a title shot against Kong. On the February 19 edition of Impact! during an interview with Bolt, she was interrupted by Saeed, who claimed that Bolt talked too much and did not understand anything, to which Bolt responded by saying "she understood, she just didn't listen". The following week on Impact!, Bolt and Rhaka Khan called out both Saeed and Awesome Kong and challenged them to a match, which they won after Bolt pinned Saeed, which in turn made Bolt and Khan fan favorites.

On March 5 edition of Impact!, Bolt and Khan lost to The Beautiful People in a four corners tag team match. It was announced on the same edition of Impact! that Bolt would finally challenge Kong for the Knockout Championship at Destination X, which she lost. Bolt soon reverted into a villain again, and competed in the Queen of the Cage match at Lockdown against ODB, Madison Rayne and Daffney, which ODB won. On April 23, edition of Impact!, she defeated Taylor Wilde in a ladder match after knocking Wilde off the ladder with brass knuckles, earning herself yet another shot at the Knockout Championship. She received her title shot on the May 28, edition of Impact!, but lost the match after Angelina Love sprayed perfume in her eyes and then performed her Lights Out finishing move. On the September 3, edition of Impact!, she participated in the Knockouts Tag Team Championship tournament, teaming with Hamada in a losing effort to Tara and Christy Hemme in the first round. After the match, Hamada attacked Bolt. On November 10, Bynum was released from her TNA contract.

In 2013, Bolt appeared on TNA's One Night Only: Knockout Knockdown, where she fought Hannah Blossom and Taeler Hendrix in a three-way match, which was won by Blossom.

=== Ohio Valley Wrestling (2009–2013) ===
==== Women's Champion (2009–2011) ====
It was announced on Ohio Valley Wrestling's website that Josie would return to OVW to wrestle Hannah Blossom for the Women's Championship at the OVW's Thanksgiving Thunder. At the event, Josie defeated Blossom for her fourth Women's Title. Four days later, the title was awarded back to Blossom after a review of match footage by the OVW board of directors showed that Josie pinned Hannah's twin sister Holly, not Hannah herself. The next week, Josie defeated the Blossom Twins in a bake off to earn a title shot the next week, Josie was able to win the rematch defeating Hannah after eliminating Holly at ringside to win her fifth women's title. Her first official defense of the title would be against Taryn Shay who won a best of 3 series with CJ Lane to earn her shot at the title. The match would end in a disqualification when Shay would knock Josie into Epiphany who was the special referee of the match. Later, Josie offered Epiphany a title shot, which ended in a no contest when the remaining girls on the roster would interfere, surprisingly picking sides; Taryn Shay & CJ Lane on behalf of Epiphany and Team Blossom on behalf of Josie. Josie has since tried to attack former friend CJ Lane for turning on her but Lane has avoided her, many times leaving Epiphany to fend for herself in tag matches with the two vs. Team Blossom.

The two would finally face off at OVW's Riot Act 2010 event where Josie lost the OVW women's title to CJ Lane after being hit with a lead pipe. Months, after that Josie returned again as heel, defeating Holly Blossom on OVW's Summer Scorcher 2010 to become the second woman to hold the OVW women's title six times (after Serena). In September, Josie joined force with Taryn Shay to feud the Blossoms. The feud of the two teams ended up in a match at OVW's Saturday Night Special on December 11, when Josie & Taryn would defeat them in a Loser Leaves OVW match. However, in the end of 2010 Josie was named the Queen of OVW since Paredyse being the king. In early 2011, Josie now known as Lady JoJo (coming from Lady Gaga) start a feud with CJ Lane over the women's title again. JoJo defeated her and retain the women's title on episode 604. After the match, JoJo & Shay would attack her, however Team Blossom make their return to OVW with the reason that the rule - that they would not be signed until 90 days. On episode 605, The Blossoms challenged JoJo & Shay to a rematch at OVW's Saturday Night Special on April 2. The Blossoms defeated them & get back in OVW. Holly Blossom made her OVW return match, defeating Lady JoJo on episode 607 after interference from C.J. Lane. She had a successful title defense in an eight-woman gauntlet match at OVW's Saturday Night Special on May 14.

On May 28, 2011, Josie now using the name Lady JoJo became the longest reigning OVW Women's Champion as her sixth title reign surpassed the previous record of 273 days set by Melody's reign. In June she started a feud with newcomer Trina, who recently debuted to OVW. On episode 614, Trina challenged JoJo in a bikini contest in which she won, however was attacked by JoJo & Taryn Shay. At OVW's Saturday Night Special on June 11, JoJo defeated Trina to retain her title.

At OVW's Saturday Night Special on August 6, JoJo lost the OVW Women's title to Izza Belle Smothers ending her reign of 343 days. At OVW's TV Tapings on August 24, JoJo regained the Women's Title, defeating Izza Belle Smothers with help from Lennox Norris in a rematch, becoming the first woman to hold the title seven times. At OVW's Saturday Night Special on September 3, JoJo, Taryn Shay and Lennox Norris lost in a tag team match to the Smother's Twisted Daughters and their father Tracy Smothers.

On episode 632, JoJo was pinned by newcomer Taeler Hendrix in a non-title match. On episode 633, JoJo was pinned again by Hendrix in a tag team match, leading her to a Women's Championship match. On episode 634, Taeler Hendrix defeated Lady JoJo via disqualification, after she slapped the referee and retain the Women's Championship.

==== Various storylines (2012–2013) ====
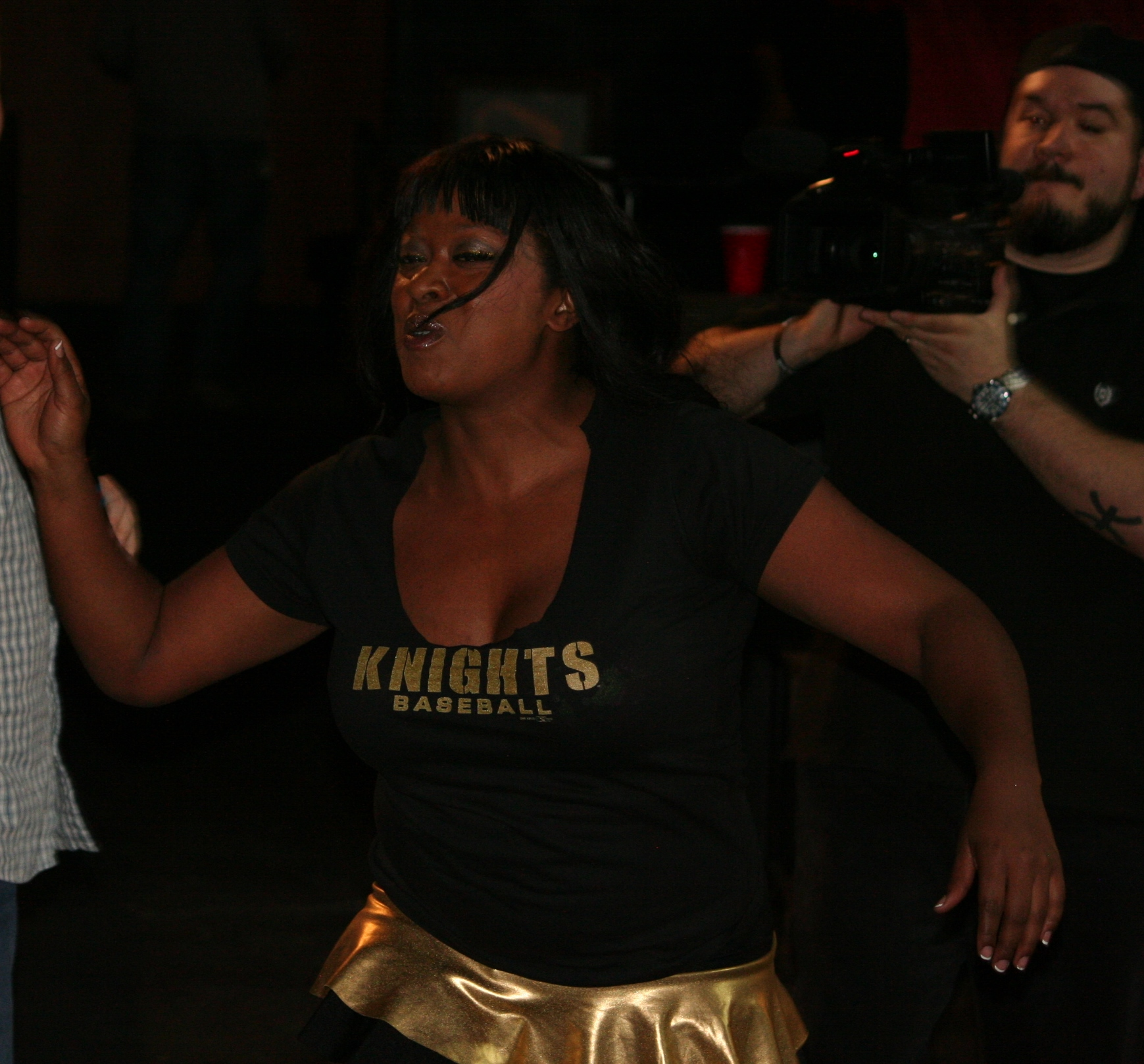
Bolt in 2014

On November 12, 2011, at OVW's Saturday Night Special, Lady JoJo lost the OVW Women's Championship to Taeler Hendrix. Since losing the Women's Championship, JoJo was put into a storyline with referee Chris Sharpe.

On the February 25, 2012, episode of OVW, Bynum now working under her real name, announced that she was secretly married to Christian Mascagni (former Talent Arbitrator) and recently divorced, with her getting all the power he had. However, she became the new leader of the group "The Family" (including Rudy Switchblade, Jessie Godderz, Mohammad Ali Vaez and Rob Terry). Later, in the main event of the show, Bynum put Godderz and Rob Terry in a match against Jason Wayne and Shiloh Jonze for the OVW Southern Tag Team Championship. She made it no disqualifications handicap match midway through the match adding Rudy Switchblade as Godderz and Terry's partner. Terry pinned Jason Wayne and won the OVW Southern Tag Team Championship for his team. On April 7, at OVW's Saturday Night Special event, after Rob Terry defeated Trailer Park Trash due the stipulation Bynum has full control of OVW. However at July 7, at OVW's Saturday Night Special, after Frank Miller's representative Johnny Spade won the OVW Heavyweight Championship and Mohamad Ali Vaez turned on The Family and won the OVW Television Championship, Josette lost possession of the promotion and was later assigned as Miller's secretary.

After nearly seven months of inactivity in the ring, Bynum was signed a match against Heidi Lovelace at OVW's Saturday Night Special on October 6, with the stipulation if she wins she will earn a match for the OVW Women's Championship. At the event, Josie defeated Lovelace to earn another match against her for the championship. The following weeks, Bynum started a rivalry with Taeler Hendrix once again after Hendrix (who lost the belt to Heidi Lovelace) wanted to get her rematch clause. The two divas teamed up in a tag team match against The Blossom Twins on the October 18 episode of OVW, but lost the match because of miscommunication. Both divas got their respective matches for the Women's Championship at OVW's Saturday Night Special during a triple threat match against Heidi Lovelace, but lost the match after Heidi pinned her Taeler retain. On the November 7 episode of OVW, Bynum (who was calling somebody in the previous episodes) was seen backstage as a masked man attacked Frank Miller (also known as Trailer Park Trash), hinting to get back to her old position. On the December 8 episode of OVW, it was revealed that the masked man was Flash Flanagan and that JoJo asked for his help to take down Trash. On March 3, 2013, after Trailer Park Trash's retirement match, he put Bynum through a table, marking her final appearance with OVW.

== Acting career ==
Bynum appeared in the horror film The Legacy, featuring Jim O'Rear, Daniel Emery Taylor and Dale Miller as well as fellow wrestlers Roni Jonah and Cynthia Lynch. Also, she appeared in one episode of All Worked Up when a fan (fellow OVW wrestler Paredyse) was harassing and insulting her.

== Personal life ==
Bynum is the youngest of ten children and was raised on a farm in northern Minnesota.

== Championships and accomplishments ==
- 3X Wrestling
  - 3XW Women's Championship (1 time)
- Coast to Coast Wrestling Association
  - Coast to Coast Women's Championship (1 time)
- Midwest Intensity Wrestling
  - MIW Women's Championship (1 time)
- NWA Midwest
  - NWA Midwest Women's Championship (1 time)
- Ohio Valley Wrestling
  - OVW Women's Championship (7 times)
  - Queen of OVW (2010)
- Pro Wrestling Illustrated
  - Ranked No. 24 of the top 50 female wrestlers in the PWI Female 50 in 2009
- Total Nonstop Action Wrestling
  - TNA Gauntlet for the Gold (2009 – Knockouts)
- Ultimate Championship Wrestling
  - UCW-AWA Women's Championship (1 time)
- World League Wrestling
  - WLW Ladies Championship (2 times)
- Xtreme Bombshells Women
  - XBW Women's Championship (1 time)
