= 2001 Teen Choice Awards =

2001 Teen Choice Award ceremony

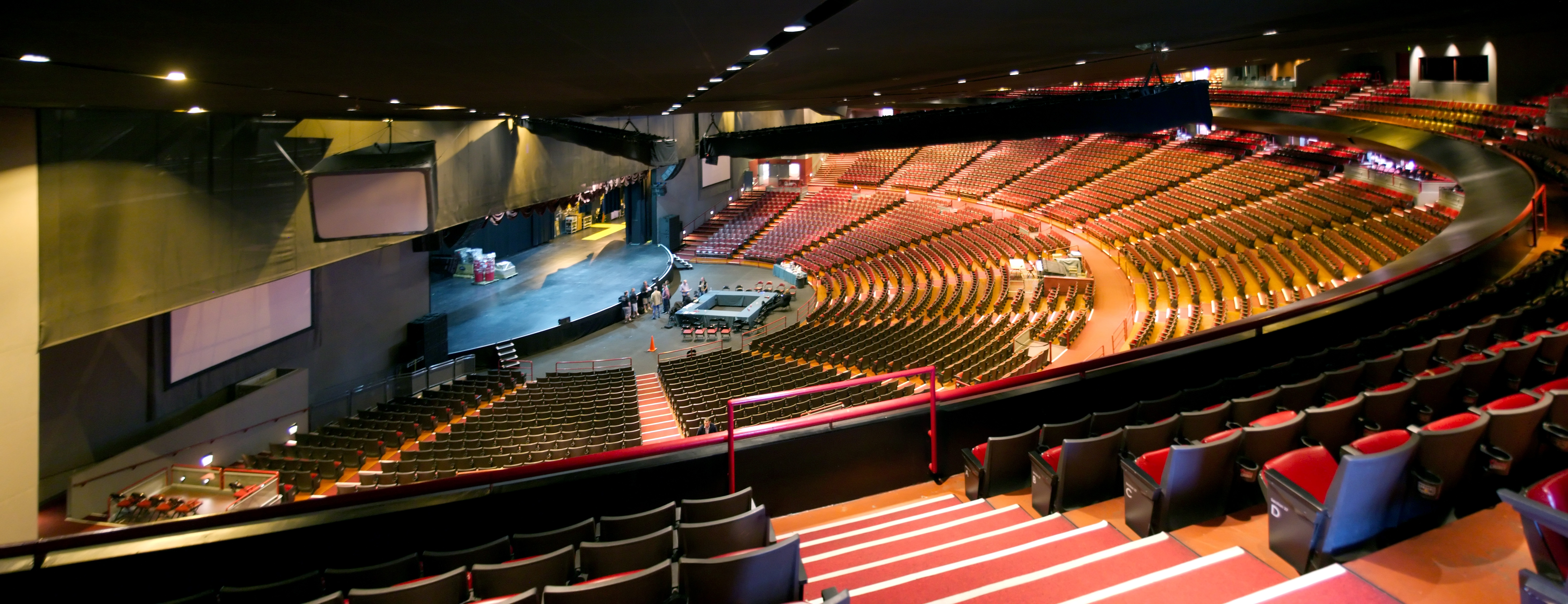
- Gibson Amphitheatre
- Date: August 12, 2001
- Location: Universal Amphitheatre, Universal City, California
- Hosted by: None

Television/radio coverage
- Network: Fox

The 2001 Teen Choice Awards ceremony was held on August 12, 2001, at the Universal Amphitheatre, Universal City, California. The event had no designated host but Destiny's Child introduced the show with Aaron Carter and Nick Carter, Usher, Eve and Gwen Stefani and Shaggy as performers. Sarah Michelle Gellar received the Extraordinary Achievement Award. The ceremony was broadcast on Fox TV on August 20, 2001.

== Performers ==
- Moulin Huge
- Aaron Carter & Nick Carter – "Not Too Young, Not Too Old"
- Usher – "U Remind Me"
- Eve feat. Gwen Stefani – "Let Me Blow Ya Mind"
- Shaggy – "Angel"

== Presenters ==
- Shaggy – introduced Moulin Huge
- Destiny's Child – presented Choice Movie Comedy
- Jessica Simpson and Ashton Kutcher – presented Choice Single
- Frankie Muniz and Dream – presented Choice TV Actress
- Lisa "Left Eye" Lopes and David Boreanaz – presented Choice TV Personality
- Nick Cannon and 3LW – introduced Aaron Carter and Nick Carter
- Anne Hathaway and Sean Patrick Thomas – presented Choice Movie Actress
- Britney Spears – presented Choice Rock Track
- Carrot Top – presented Choice Movie Sleazebag
- Lynsey Bartilson, Mo Collins, and Debra Wilson – presented Choice TV Drama
- Eden's Crush and Lil' Bow Wow – introduced Usher
- Erika Christensen and Tony Hawk – presented Choice Movie Actor
- Sisqó and Tyrese – presented Choice Female Artist
- Jared Padalecki – introduced surfboard presenters and Freddie Prinze Jr.
- Freddie Prinze Jr. – presented Choice Female Hottie
- Keri Russell – introduced Eve and Gwen Stefani
- Mila Kunis and Kerry Washington – presented Choice Summer Movie
- Pamela Anderson and David Spade – presented Choice Rock Group
- Michelle Trachtenberg – presented Extraordinary Achievement Award
- Chris Kattan and *NSYNC – presented Choice Movie Wipeout
- JoJo Wright – introduced Nivea, Meredith Edwards, Christina Milian, Kaci Battaglia, Solange Knowles, and Dante Thomas
- Mandy Moore and Mandy Lauderdale – introduced Shaggy
- Mýa and City High – presented Choice Pop Group
- Jennifer Love Hewitt – presented Choice Comedian

== Winners and nominees ==
Winners are listed first and highlighted in bold text.

=== Movies ===
Choice Movie Actor	Choice Movie Actress
**Ben Affleck – Pearl Harbor**; Brendan Fraser – The Mummy Returns; Josh Hartnett – Pearl Harbor; Ashton Kutcher – Dude, Where's My Car?; Heath Ledger – A Knight's Tale; Ryan Phillippe – Antitrust; Ben Stiller – Meet the Parents; Sean Patrick Thomas – Save the Last Dance	**Julia Stiles – Save the Last Dance**; Drew Barrymore – Charlie's Angels; Sandra Bullock – Miss Congeniality; Rachael Leigh Cook – Josie and the Pussycats; Kirsten Dunst – Bring It On; Jennifer Love Hewitt – Heartbreakers; Kate Hudson – Almost Famous; Angelina Jolie – Lara Croft: Tomb Raider
Choice Movie: Drama/Action Adventure	Choice Movie: Comedy
**Pearl Harbor**; Almost Famous; A Knight's Tale; Lara Croft: Tomb Raider; The Mummy Returns; Remember the Titans; Save the Last Dance; Vertical Limit	**Miss Congeniality**; Bring It On; Charlie's Angels; Dude, Where's My Car?; Joe Dirt; Josie and the Pussycats; Meet the Parents; The Wedding Planner
Choice Movie: Horror/Thriller	Choice Movie Sleazebag
**Urban Legends: Final Cut**; Antitrust; Book of Shadows: Blair Witch 2; The Cell; The Gift; Hannibal; Valentine; The Watcher	**Dwayne "The Rock" Johnson – The Mummy Returns**; Candice Bergen – Miss Congeniality; Victor Garber – Legally Blonde; Iain Glen – Lara Croft: Tomb Raider; Anthony Hopkins – Hannibal; Sam Rockwell – Charlie's Angels; Rufus Sewell – A Knight's Tale; Rick Yune – The Fast and the Furious
Choice Movie Breakout	Choice Movie Hissy Fit
**Kerry Washington – Save the Last Dance**; Jamie Bell – Billy Elliot; Erika Christensen – Traffic; Rosario Dawson – Josie and the Pussycats; Patrick Fugit – Almost Famous; Michelle Rodriguez – Girlfight; Shannyn Sossamon – A Knight's Tale; Zhang Ziyi – Crouching Tiger, Hidden Dragon	**Jim Carrey – How the Grinch Stole Christmas**; Sandra Bullock – Miss Congeniality; Courteney Cox – 3000 Miles to Graceland; Vin Diesel – The Fast and the Furious; Angelina Jolie – Lara Croft: Tomb Raider; Ashton Kutcher – Dude, Where's My Car?; Mark Wahlberg – Planet of the Apes; Reese Witherspoon – Legally Blonde
Choice Movie Chemistry	Choice Movie Fight
**Tom Hanks and Wilson the Volleyball – Cast Away**; Ben Affleck and Kate Beckinsale – Pearl Harbor; Kirsten Dunst and Ben Foster – Get Over It; Hugh Grant and Renée Zellweger – Bridget Jones's Diary; Ashton Kutcher and Seann William Scott – Dude, Where's My Car?; Heath Ledger and Shannyn Sossamon – A Knight's Tale; Jennifer Lopez and Matthew McConaughey – The Wedding Planner; Brad Pitt and Julia Roberts – The Mexican	**Julia Stiles vs. Bianca Lawson – Save the Last Dance**; Drew Barrymore vs. Sam Rockwell – Charlie's Angels; Hugh Grant vs. Colin Firth – Bridget Jones's Diary; Angelina Jolie vs. Iain Glen – Lara Croft: Tomb Raider; Heath Ledger vs. Rufus Sewell – A Knight's Tale; Michelle Yeoh vs. Zhang Ziyi – Crouching Tiger, Hidden Dragon; Paul Walker vs. Rick Yune – The Fast and the Furious; Rachel Weisz vs. Patricia Velásquez – The Mummy Returns
Choice Movie Wipeout	Choice Movie Your Parents Didn't Want You to See
**Sandra Bullock – Miss Congeniality**; Drew Barrymore – Charlie's Angels; Jet Li – Kiss of the Dragon; Michelle Rodriguez – The Fast and the Furious; Rob Schneider – The Animal; Rufus Sewell – A Knight's Tale; Mark Wahlberg – Planet of the Apes; Bruce Willis – Unbreakable	**Scary Movie 2**; Bridget Jones's Diary; Freddy Got Fingered; Hannibal; The Mexican; Swordfish; Tomcats; Valentine
Choice Summer Movie
**Legally Blonde**; The Fast and the Furious; Jurassic Park III; Kiss of the Dragon; Lara Croft: Tomb Raider; Planet of the Apes; Scary Movie 2; Swordfish

=== Television ===
Choice TV Actor	Choice TV Actress
**Joshua Jackson – Dawson's Creek**; Jason Behr – Roswell; Topher Grace – That '70s Show; Ashton Kutcher – That '70s Show; Eric McCormack – Will & Grace; Frankie Muniz – Malcolm in the Middle; Barry Watson – 7th Heaven; Michael Weatherly – Dark Angel	**Jessica Alba – Dark Angel**; Alexis Bledel – Gilmore Girls; Sarah Michelle Gellar – Buffy the Vampire Slayer; Katherine Heigl – Roswell; Katie Holmes – Dawson's Creek; Mila Kunis – That '70s Show; Debra Messing – Will & Grace; Keri Russell – Felicity
Choice TV Drama	Choice TV Comedy
**7th Heaven**; Boston Public; Buffy the Vampire Slayer; Dark Angel; Dawson's Creek; Felicity; Gilmore Girls; Roswell	**Friends**; Grounded for Life; Malcolm in the Middle; My Wife and Kids; Popular; The Simpsons; That '70s Show; Will & Grace
Choice Reality TV Show	Choice Late Night TV Show
**Total Request Live**; Boot Camp; Jackass; Making the Band; Popstars; The Real World: Back to New York; Survivor; Temptation Island	**Saturday Night Live**; The Late Late Show with Craig Kilborn; Late Night with Conan O'Brien; Late Show with David Letterman; Mad TV; MTV Undressed; Politically Incorrect with Bill Maher; The Tonight Show with Jay Leno
Choice TV Personality	Choice TV Sidekick
**Carson Daly – Total Request Live**; Andy Dick – The Andy Dick Show; Jimmy Fallon – Saturday Night Live; Johnny Knoxville – Jackass; Mandy Lauderdale – Temptation Island; Ananda Lewis – HotZONE; Roger Lodge – Blind Date; Jeff Probst – Survivor	**Sean Hayes – Will & Grace**; Keiko Agena – Gilmore Girls; Brendan Fehr – Roswell; Alyson Hannigan – Buffy the Vampire Slayer; Ron Lester – Popular; Megan Mullally – Will & Grace; Erik Per Sullivan – Malcolm in the Middle; Michelle Trachtenberg – Buffy the Vampire Slayer

=== Music ===
Choice Male Artist	Choice Female Artist
**Aaron Carter**; Bow Wow; Eminem; Kid Rock; Lenny Kravitz; Nelly; Shaggy; Sisqó	**Britney Spears**; Aaliyah; Christina Aguilera; Dido; Janet Jackson; Jennifer Lopez; Pink; Jessica Simpson
Choice Pop Group	Choice Rock Group
**Destiny's Child**; 3LW; 98 Degrees; Backstreet Boys; Dream; Eden's Crush; NSYNC; O-Town	**Blink-182**; 3 Doors Down; Aerosmith; Crazy Town; Creed; Limp Bizkit; No Doubt; Papa Roach
Choice R&B/Hip-Hop Artist	Choice Single
**Shaggy**; Missy Elliott; Eminem; Eve; Jay-Z; Mystikal; Nelly; OutKast	**"Pop" – NSYNC**; "All for You" – Janet Jackson; "Angel" – Shaggy feat. Rayvon; "Butterfly" – Crazy Town; "The Call" – Backstreet Boys; "Love Don't Cost a Thing" – Jennifer Lopez; "Stronger" – Britney Spears; "Survivor" – Destiny's Child
Choice Album	Choice R&B/Hip-Hop Track
**Celebrity – NSYNC**; All for You – Janet Jackson; Black & Blue – Backstreet Boys; Chocolate Starfish and the Hot Dog Flavored Water – Limp Bizkit; J.Lo – Jennifer Lopez; The Marshall Mathers LP – Eminem; No Angel – Dido; Survivor – Destiny's Child	**"Let Me Blow Ya Mind" – Eve feat. Gwen Stefani**; "Country Grammar (Hot Shit)" – Nelly; "Get Ur Freak On" – Missy Elliott; "Ms. Jackson" – OutKast; "Peaches & Cream" – 112; "Shake Ya Ass" – Mystikal; "Stutter" – Joe featuring Mystikal; "What Would You Do?" – City High
Choice Rock Track	Choice Love Song
**"Jaded" – Aerosmith**; "Butterfly" – Crazy Town; "Duck and Run" – 3 Doors Down; "Follow Me" – Uncle Kracker; "Hanging by a Moment" – Lifehouse; "It's Been Awhile" – Staind; "My Way" – Limp Bizkit; "One Step Closer" – Linkin Park	**"Angel" – Shaggy feat. Rayvon**; "Crazy for This Girl" – Evan and Jaron; "Ghost of You and Me" – BBMak; "If You're Gone" – Matchbox Twenty; "Irresistible" – Jessica Simpson; "Nobody Wants to Be Lonely" – Ricky Martin with Christina Aguilera; "Shape of My Heart" – Backstreet Boys; "This I Promise You" – NSYNC
Choice Dance Track	Choice Breakout Artist
**"Play" – Jennifer Lopez**; "Bootylicious" – Destiny's Child; "Get Over Yourself" – Eden's Crush; "Get Ur Freak On" – Missy Elliott; "Lady Marmalade" – Christina Aguilera, Lil' Kim, Mýa & Pink; "Ride wit Me" – Nelly feat. City Spud; "South Side" – Moby feat. Gwen Stefani; "Weapon of Choice" – Fatboy Slim	**O-Town**; 3LW; Dido; Dream; Eden's Crush; Nelly Furtado; Lifehouse; Samantha Mumba
Choice Concert	Choice Summer Song
**NSYNC**; Aerosmith; Backstreet Boys; Blink-182; Destiny's Child; Janet Jackson; Ozzfest 2001; Sugar Ray & Uncle Kracker	**"Lady Marmalade" – Christina Aguilera, Lil' Kim, Mýa & Pink**; "Angel" – Shaggy feat. Rayvon; "Bootylicious" – Destiny's Child; "Irresistible" – Jessica Simpson; "Let Me Blow Ya Mind" – Eve feat. Gwen Stefani; "Pop" – NSYNC; "Ride wit Me" – Nelly feat. City Spud; "U Remind Me" – Usher

=== Miscellaneous ===
Choice Male Hottie	Choice Female Hottie
**Justin Timberlake**; Nick Carter; Evan and Jaron; Josh Hartnett; Heath Ledger; Mark McGrath; Ryan Phillippe; Freddie Prinze Jr.	**Jennifer Lopez**; Aaliyah; Jessica Alba; Beyoncé; Anna Kournikova; Tara Reid; Britney Spears; Gwen Stefani
Choice Comedian	Choice Male Athlete
**Adam Sandler**; Tom Green; Chris Kattan; Eddie Murphy; Chris Rock; Rob Schneider; Jon Stewart; Nicole Sullivan	**Shaquille O'Neal**; Andre Agassi; Kobe Bryant; Jeff Gordon; Allen Iverson; Derek Jeter; Peyton Manning; Tiger Woods
Choice Female Athlete	Choice Extreme Athlete
**Mia Hamm**; Laila Ali; Chamique Holdsclaw; Marion Jones; Anna Kournikova; Michelle Kwan; Annika Sörenstam; Venus Williams & Serena Williams	**Tony Hawk**; Megan Abubo; Tara Dakides; Tara Hamilton; Jeremy McGrath; Dave Mirra; Joe Pak; Shaun Palmer
Choice Model
**Tyrese**; Gisele Bündchen; Esther Cañadas; Laetitia Casta; Bridget Hall; Carmen Kass; Jaime King; Heidi Klum
