= Manos Arriba =

EP by Chana
- Released: March 2008
- Studio: 29 Music (Echo Park); Bernie Gurdnman Mastering (Hollywood); Sonora Records (Los Angeles)
- Genre: Pop
- Length: 16:17
- Language: Spanish
- Label: Patacon
- Producer: Chana; Marthin Chan

Singles from Manos Arriba
- 1. "No Me Mandes Flores" Released: 2008; 2. "La Duda" Released: 2008

Manos Arriba (English: Hands Up) is an extended play (EP) by American singer Rosanna Tavarez released by her own record label Patacon Productions in March 2008. Tavarez adopted the stage name Chana while pursuing a music career in Latin alternative music and used it for the EP. Chana rose to prominence in 2001 as a member of the girl group Eden's Crush. Following their disbandment, she worked as a host on music television shows and decided to record Spanish-language music after meeting producer Marthin Chan. She had previously rejected working with Latin music producers because she did not want to pursue a career in conventional Latin pop.

A pop EP, Manos Arriba includes influences from other genres such as reggae, ska, power pop, and disco. The lyrics were based on Chana's past relationships and break-ups. She wrote and produced all five songs with Chan, and recorded them in Los Angeles, including at his personal recording studio, over roughly two years. Chana was inspired by studying Afro-Dominican dance and music. Music journalists believed the EP was not directly rooted in specifically Latin genres or topics and contrasted the style with her work with Eden's Crush.

Reviews were generally positive from critics, who praised the EP's production. Manos Arriba had two singles: "No Me Mandes Flores" and "La Duda". For the beginning of March 2008, "No Me Mandes Flores" was the third most downloaded song on iTunes Latino, and "La Duda", along with the rest of Manos Arriba, were promoted by the iTunes Store's Latin music section. Chana released a music video for the track "Icaro", which reviewers described as inspired by her modern dance training. She promoted the EP through live performances in nightclubs across the United States, on Spanish-language networks, and at industry showcases.

== Background ==
Rosanna Tavarez developed an early interest in music, initially being inspired by the musical Annie. She moved from New York City to Miami at age nine and attended the New World School of the Arts. Tavarez studied dance as an undergraduate student at the University of Michigan and choreography at Ohio State University's graduate program. After trying to join a New York dance company, she returned to Miami where she was approached by Latin music producers who thought her appearance would make her an ideal Latin pop singer. Tavarez rejected their offers because she felt unprepared for a music career. At the time, she had only performed in karaoke and did not have any vocal training. In a 2008 interview with the Los Angeles Times, Tavarez recalled she did not want to be "just another girl doing Latin-y pop", instead preferring to develop "something distinctive, even if the crowd would be more niche".

In 2001, the WB Television Network (the WB) aired an American version of the reality television franchise Popstars, and its first season focused on creating a girl group. After seeing an ad in the Miami New Times, Tavarez participated in the series, and along with four other finalists, became a member of the group Eden's Crush. The same year, they signed a record deal with London-Sire Records, which released their debut studio album Popstars and its lead single "Get Over Yourself". The album peaked at number six on the US Billboard 200 chart and the single reached the top ten of the Billboard Hot 100.

Eden's Crush disbanded after London-Sire Records closed in 2001. In 2008, Tavarez told the Houston Chronicle that Eden's Crush was not representative of her style or musical preferences. After Eden's Crush ended, Tavarez worked as a host for programs such as the music television series On Air with Ryan Seacrest and the second season of Jammin'. She credited her work on the TV Guide Channel with giving her the time and money to experiment with music and dance.

== Recording ==
Tavarez moved to Los Angeles because of her husband Andres Baez's work with Univision, and she was introduced to musician Marthin Chan in 2005 through his mutual friends with Baez. Chan was known as a songwriter and guitarist for the rock band Volumen Cero, and he was putting together the group Popvert with MTV executive Jose Tillan. While auditioning singers for Popvert, he met Tavarez and they bonded over having grown up in New York City in the 1980s and their musical interests, specifically in the bands Depeche Mode, the Cure, and Velocity Girl. As Tavarez focused on Latin alternative music, she adopted the stage name Chana, a childhood nickname and a shortening of her first name Rosanna.

Chana recorded music with Chan for over two years, at his recording studio in Echo Park, as well as at Sonora Recorders in Los Angeles. While recording, Chan produced the instrumental and Chana wrote melodies and lyrics to the track, although they helped one another if they struggled to find a certain sound or word. In a 2008 Houston Chronicle interview, Chana said Chan was an integral part of the recording process, likening him to Timbaland and his collaborations with Justin Timberlake. She based lyrics on past relationships and break-ups, and said recording these songs was difficult. Although she found writing in Spanish to be more challenging, Chana thought the language was more poetic than English and that she could write better lyrics that way; she often consulted an English–Spanish dictionary to translate her ideas.

Chana and Chan recorded eighteen songs, out of which five were chosen for the extended play (EP) Manos Arriba. They initially created these songs to secure a recording contract, but later decided to release an EP as independent musicians. Chana believed this decision had allowed her to maintain creative control over her music and image, but said creating music without support from a record label was more challenging because it took more time. She was the creative director for the EP, and Steve Joseph handled the art direction and design.

Chan programmed the music on Manos Arriba and played the guitar and synthesizers. Additional instruments were played by Louis Tamblay and Eric J (bass guitar), Darrius Minnaee (drums), Stewart Cole (trumpet), Dan Osterman (trombone), and Fran Iturbe (guitar). Eric J mixed four of the EP's tracks at Sonora Recorders, with the assistance of Chris Constable and Richard Barron, while "Icaro" was done by Orlando "Don" Vitto at the Warehouse Recording Studios in Miami. All of the songs were mastered at Bernie Grundman Mastering in Hollywood.

== Music and lyrics ==
=== Sound ===
Chana described Manos Arriba as "trop-electro-hip-pop"; while studying Afro-Dominican dance and music in the Dominican Republic, she was inspired by how musicians combined elements of their folklore with electronic music. When the New York Daily News's Carolina González viewed the EP as pop with diverse influences, Chana explained: "The definition of pop has become looser, more inclusive. When you talk about pop, you're basically talking about a hook, a melody that catches your attention." Chana sought to keep the music accessible while also artistic, but emphasized she never tried to be as experimental as Björk. In a 2008 Billboard interview, she said she did not focus on commercial appeal while recording the EP, such as attempting to go platinum or get radio airplay.

In LA Weekly, Falling James wrote that although Chana performs "sunny melodies" throughout Manos Arriba, the songs have "a harder, funkier and more readily danceable ska backing". Other critics pointed out the use of wind instruments and video game noises in its production. Some music journalists found the EP to be disconnected from Latin music. González wrote that although Chana sings in Spanish, none of the lyrics are specifically about Latin topics; she likened the productions to reggae, power pop, and disco and felt certain songs had a "retro-futurist disco feel". Billboard's Ayala Ben-Yehuda said the EP does not conform to conventional Spanish-language genres. and Sergio Burstein of the Houston Chronicle did not hear any influences of merengue and salsa music, genres that Chana listened to as a child. While discussing Tavarez's music as Chana, critics contrasted it with Eden's Crush, including a Latina writer who said that she "imploded her girl-group roots". Jordan Levin for PopMatters felt her "hip indie Latina persona" for Manos Arriba was more authentic than her image as "a prefab pop figurine" in Eden's Crush.

=== Songs ===
The Los Angeles Times's Agustin Gurza characterized Manos Arriba as "songs of personal passion delivered with cool detachment". The EP opens with "No Me Mandes Flores" ("Don't Send Me Flowers"), which Gurza referenced as a "cold kiss-off to a stubborn ex-lover". In the Los Angeles Times, Tommy Calle wrote that the title was reminiscent of two 2006 singles—Fanny Lu's "No Te Pido Flores" ("I'm Not Asking You For Flowers") and Fonseca's "Te Mando Flores" ("I Send You Flowers"). The second song "A Veces" ("At Times") is about jealousy and a man who does not pay attention to his girlfriend. The track has tropical influences and uses what Levin called "old-school salsa horns". Burstein compared the production to big band music, and James wrote that Chana's vocals on the song, as well as on "La Duda" ("The Doubt"), were similar to Julieta Venegas, specifically her "airy pop".

Ben-Yehuda referred to the third track "La Duda" as a "flirtatious challenge to a guy giving mixed signals" built on an instrumental featuring synths. Cory Bohon for Engadget said that the song had a dance-inspired opening before transitioning to "an electronic-tinged alt-pop tune with searing guitars and disco bass-lines". For the following track "Icaro" ("Icarus"), Chana provides her own perspective on the Greek myth; rather than criticizing Icarus for his hubris, the lyrics praise his desire to follow his passions despite the risks. Chana identified with Icarus, explaining: "I would rather take the risk and fall on my butt. It's about that part of you that says just do it." Burstein compared Chana's vocals on "Icaro" to Andrea Echeverri. The EP closes with "The Whistler", a song that mocks the practice of catcalling; Levin and Gurza interpreted the track as a humorous take on the activity. Rapper Malverde adds guest vocals to "The Whistler" in which he assumes the role of a cat-caller. The instrumental includes what James described as "bouncing dub echoes".

== Release and promotion ==
=== Release and singles ===
Manos Arriba was released in March 2008 by Chana's own record label Patacon Productions as an audio CD and a digital EP. (Note: Apple Music lists Manos Arriba's release date as January 1, 2008, while Billboard reports it was issued in March 2008. A Diario Libre article further specifies the date as March 25, 2008.) Chana held a release party in Los Angeles, which she described as "this crazy multimedia thing" featuring a local promoter and disc jockey as well as dancers. Following the release of Manos Arriba, Chana discussed wanting to release a full album, which would include songs from the EP, and in a 2010 interview, she said she was working on it with Thom Russo. She talked about expanding her sound to add a "more layered" production and sound, explaining: "We have better resources now, so I’m just excited to see what happens." According to a 2021 Billboard article, Tavarez has transitioned from music to a career in dance; she said in a separate interview that after turning 32, she decided to complete her Master of Fine Arts degree in choreography and fully focus on being a dancer.

The iTunes Store featured Manos Arriba as the "Best of the Week" on iTunes Latino, the store's Latin music section. Two singles – "No Me Mandes Flores" and "La Duda" – were released from the EP. "No Me Mandes Flores"' was the third most downloaded song in iTunes Latino for the beginning of March 2008. "La Duda" was selected as a free download for iTunes Latino's Single of the Week, which Cory Bohon described as a way to broaden exposure to up-and-coming artists.

Chana promoted "Icaro" with a music video, in which she performs what Jordan Levin calls "full body twists and falls of modern dance". Levin thought Chana drew upon her experiences at the New World School of the Arts and the dance program at Ohio University. Carolina González wrote that Chana "vindicates" Icarus with her choreography; González viewed her performance as indicative of her past dancing training in a magnet school and as part of the Los Angeles Contemporary Dance Company.

=== Live performances ===
Chana promoted Manos Arriba through live performances at nightclubs across the United States. According to Agustin Gurza, Chana and Chan focused on the "local party circuit" as well as a "hip series of happenings" done by the promoters Turn Off the Radio, Hang the Deejays, Remezcla, and Automatico. For these performances, they used a band made up of local musicians; Chana said that she hired members of the ska band Upground to help make the songs sound fuller and more alive. When discussing her eclectic performances with González, Chana said: "It’s how someone defined rock n' roll to me once. You rock, you get in a van, and then you roll." She said Los Angeles was a major part of her promotion because of its large Latino population and the amount of opportunities available for up-and-coming Latin artists. In addition to her U.S. performances, Chana did a show at the Hard Rock Cafe in Santo Domingo in the Dominican Republic.

Chana performed songs from the EP on Spanish-language networks, like mun2 and Telemundo, and at industry showcases. (Note: An industry showcase is a private event in which up-and-coming singers perform for people within the music industry, such as disc jockeys, radio station managers, radio programmers, and music executives. These events are done to build interest in an artist.) Her first showcase was in the fall of 2007 in Hollywood; other events included the Latin Alternative Music Conference, the Los Angeles' Sunset Junction festival, and the Billboard Latin Music Conference, where she performed alongside Aleks Syntek. Chana was a performer at the 2006 Latin Billboard Music Awards, and an opening act for Latin rock band Locos por Juana. Reviews for Chana's performances were positive. Ayala Ben-Yehuda praised her ability to "take audiences along for the ride with a convincing swagger and a dose of self-deprecating humor". Levin and González wrote that the EP and live performances helped with building buzz for Chana.

== Critical reception ==
Manos Arriba was generally well received by critics, such as a Latina writer who considered it some of "the best Latin music you don't know". Ayala Ben-Yehuda commended the songs for having strong hooks and themes that are easily accessible to a large audience. Jordan Levin and Falling James highlighted Chana's personality in their reviews. Levin attributed the EP's success to her "faith in her instincts, disregard for convention, and impish sense of fun". James wrote that her dance and art school were apparent through the tracks, and appreciated her refusal to "dumb down" her music.

The EP's production was the subject of praise. James appreciated the music's levity, writing: "Who says music has to be full of doom and gloom all the time?" Describing Manos Arriba as representative of the Echo Park music scene, Agustin Gurza characterized the compositions as "infectious fusion of Caribbean rhythms, cool electronic vibes and sharp, satirical lyrics". Levin referred to the EP as "infectious [and] genre-straddling", and People en Español's Laura Kusnyer and a writer for Univision thought the uptempo songs inspired people to dance. In the Los Angeles Times, Reed Johnson praised as a "hot house hybrid", and looked forward to a full album by Chana and Chan.

== Track listing ==
All tracks were written and produced by Chana and Marthin Chan.

No.	Title	Length
1.	"No Me Mandes Flores"	3:23
2.	"A Veces"	3:09
3.	"La Duda"	3:04
4.	"Icaro"	2:42
5.	"The Whistler" (featuring Malverde)	3:01
Total length:		16:17

== Personnel ==
Credits are adapted from the liner notes of Manos Arriba:

- Richard Barron – assistant mixing
- Marthin Chan – writer, producer, synths, guitar, programming
- Chana – vocals, writer, producer, creative direction
- Stewart Cole – trumpet
- Chris Constable – assistant mixing
- Fran Iturbe – guitar
- Eric J – mixing, bass
- Steve Joseph – art direction, design
- Malverde – guest appearance
- Darrius Minnaee – drums
- Dan Osterman – trombone
- Lous Tamblay – bass
- Orlando "Don" Vitto – mixing
