= Rosanna Tavarez =

American television personality (born 1977)

- Born: Rosanna Tavarez; February 10, 1977 (age 49); New York City, U.S.
- Occupations: Singer; television host; dancer; teacher
- Spouse: Andres Baez (m. 2003)

Rosanna Tavarez (Note: Tavarez has used stage names in different parts of her career. When she recorded Latin alternative music, she adopted the name Chana, a childhood nickname and a shortening of her first name Rosanna. When she focused on her dance career, she took on the name LA DANSA DANSA.) (born February 10, 1977) is an American singer, television host, dancer, and teacher. She rose to prominence in 2001 as a contestant on the American version of the reality television franchise Popstars. As one of the show's five finalists, she became a member of the girl group Eden's Crush. In the same year, they released their debut studio album and its lead single "Get Over Yourself", but disbanded after their record label London-Sire Records closed.

After Eden's Crush, Tavarez worked as a host on music television shows and recorded Latin alternative music. Under the stage name Chana, she released the extended play (EP) Manos Arriba in 2008. Tavarez has subsequently transitioned away from music and has instead focused on teaching and dance.

== Early life ==
Rosanna Tavarez was born on February 10, 1977, in New York City and was raised in the city's Washington Heights neighborhood. Her parents—Frank and Lelia Tavarez—were born in the Dominican Republic. Her mother worked as a seamstress, doing piece work at home, and according to a Warner Bros. press release, her younger brother, Omar, became a "jazz drummer". Tavarez stayed connected with Latino culture through her close relationship with her grandmother and being surrounded by Spanish-speaking people as well as Latin music, such as salsa, méringue, tropical music, and Latin pop. She became interested in music and dance at a young age, being inspired by the musical Annie and imitating the Solid Gold dancers and ballerinas in The Nutcracker. Initially dancing salsa and merengue in her family's living room, she started ballet lessons when she was three years old.

At age nine, Tavarez moved from New York City to Miami and attended the New World School of the Arts, which is a magnet school focused on the visual and performing arts. She studied dance as an undergraduate student at the University of Michigan, and credited her first semester as the point in which she "consciously shifted and embraced a career as a dancer". She went to major in choreography at the Ohio State University's graduate program. Along with these studies, she spent a summer in the Dominican Republic to research Afro-Dominican dance and music. Tavarez remained connected to New York City, saying her goals there were to sing in a band and to be in a dance company before becoming a dance teacher.

Tavarez tried to join a New York dance company, but returned to Miami; while there, she was approached by Latin music producers who thought her appearance would make her an ideal Latin pop singer. She rejected their offers because she felt unprepared for a music career. At the time, she had only performed in karaoke and did not have any vocal training. In a 2008 interview with the Los Angeles Times, Tavarez recalled she did not want to be "just another girl doing Latin-y pop", instead preferring to develop "something distinctive, even if the crowd would be more niche".

== Career ==
=== 2001–2008: Music and television ===
In 2001, Tavarez participated on the American version of the reality television franchise Popstars, which had a first season focused on forming a girl group. She decided to audition for the series after seeing an ad for it in the Miami New Times. Prior to entering the competition, Tavarez was a project away from completing her studies at the Ohio State University. She went on to be one of the show's five finalists and became a member of the group Eden's Crush. After being signed to London-Sire Records, the group released their debut studio album and its lead single "Get Over Yourself". The album peaked at number six on the US Billboard 200 chart and the single reached the top ten of the Billboard Hot 100. Eden's Crush disbanded after London-Sire Records closed in 2001.

Following Eden's Crush's disbandment, Tavarez worked as a television host on entertainment news and red carpet events. While working for the cable channel mun2, she was hired as an entertainment host for the music television series On Air with Ryan Seacrest. According to Tavarez's agent, she was hired because she was bilingual and could appeal to both English and Spanish audiences. In the Richmond Times-Dispatch, Douglas Durden wrote that Tavarez was "obviously chosen to match Seacrest in overactive enthusiasm", and compared her reporting to puff pieces. On Air with Ryan Seacrest premiered on January 12, 2004, and had its final broadcast on September 17, 2004, after being canceled by the Fox Broadcasting Company. In 2004, Tavarez was also a guest co-host on an episode of Good Day Live.

Tavarez worked on several programs for the TV Guide Channel. She was the host of Ready, Set, Change, a reality television series in which homeowners get a room redesigned based on their favorite television show. The Chicago Tribune's Carmél Carrillo compared Tavarez to Paige Davis, the host from Trading Spaces, but felt she was "little more than window dressing in the early episodes". Tavarez also hosted Idol Tonight—a pre-show for American Idol—along with two of the show's finalists: Kimberly Caldwell and Justin Guarini. She worked with Caldwell again for a pre-show for the 59th Primetime Emmy Awards. Tavarez also hosted the second season of Jammin', a reality show for Sí TV.

Tavarez married Univision producer Andres Baez in 2003, and moved to Los Angeles because of his work with the network. She was signed to SESAC and Warner Chappell Music as a songwriter and joined the Los Angeles Contemporary Dance Company. While living in Los Angeles, she collaborated with musician Marthin Chan and recorded Latin alternative music under the stage name Chana. In March 2008, she released the extended play (EP) Manos Arriba, and she wrote and produced all five of its songs with Chan. The EP was generally well received by critics, who praised its production. Tavarez promoted Manos Arriba through live performances at nightclubs, on Spanish-language networks, and at industry showcases. (Note: An industry showcase is a private event in which up-and-coming singers perform for people within the music industry, such as disc jockeys, radio station managers, radio programmers, and music executives. These events are done to build interest in an artist.)

=== 2009–present Dance and teaching ===
At age 32, Tavarez completed her Master of Fine Arts degree in choreography and decided to stop working as a television host. In an interview, she attributed this change by explaining that she wanted to "recommit to a full-time dance career". According to a 2021 Billboard, Tavarez has transitioned from music to focus on teaching and dance; she is an adjunct professor at the USC Kaufman School of Dance, and a faculty member at the California Institute of the Arts. She teaches yoga, as well as Countertechnique, which is an approach to dance developed by Anouk van Dijk.

Tavarez uses the stage name LA DANSA DANSA as a dancer in Los Angeles. According to her official website, her dance and theatre work has been featured at venues such as American Dance Festival, REDCAT, and Highways Performance Space. In 2022, she performed the dance piece "Piece X Piece", which focused on immigration.
