= List of songs recorded by Grand Theft Audio =

This is a comprehensive list of songs by British rock band Grand Theft Audio. Since forming in 1997, by the name of The Infidels, the band have released only one studio album. After reforming in 2020, the band have spawned three singles and one further studio album.

== Original songs ==
Song title	Album(s) / Single(s)	First released
"Death to the Infidels"	Blame Everyone	2000
"We Luv U"	Blame Everyone / We Luv U	2000
"Stoopid Ass"	Blame Everyone / Stoopid Ass	2000
"Rock the House"	Blame Everyone	2000
"Wake Up"	Blame Everyone	2000
"Grey, Black and White"	Blame Everyone	2000
"As Good As It Gets"	Blame Everyone	2000
"Drugs and Girls"	Blame Everyone	2000
"Avarice"	Blame Everyone	2000
"Dead Man Leaving"	Blame Everyone	2000
"Fuk U Iz It"	Stoopid Ass	2001
"Under the Landfill"	Stoopid Ass / We Luv U	2001
"Refusing the Last Line"	We Luv U	2001
"Ruin Your Youth"	Pass Me the Conch / Ruin Your Youth	2020
"Another Life"	Another Life	2021
"Ici mon decree"	Pass Me the Conch / Ici mon decree	2021
"Scrub Up"	Pass Me the Conch	2022
"Bury the Day"	Pass Me the Conch	2022
"The Gods of Rock"	Pass Me the Conch	2022
"Trevor"	Pass Me the Conch	2022
"Away"	Pass Me the Conch	2022
"Instinct"	Pass Me the Conch	2022
"The Load"	Pass Me the Conch	2022
"I Am the Algorithm"	Pass Me the Conch	2022
