= Dude, Where's My Car? =

2000 film by Danny Leiner

- Theatrical release poster
- Directed by: Danny Leiner
- Written by: Philip Stark
- Produced by: Wayne Rice; Gil Netter; Broderick Johnson; Andrew Kosove
- Starring: Ashton Kutcher; Seann William Scott; Kristy Swanson; Jennifer Garner; Marla Sokoloff
- Cinematography: Robert M. Stevens
- Edited by: Kimberly Ray
- Music by: David Kitay
- Distributed by: 20th Century Fox
- Release dates: December 10, 2000 (Fox Studios lot); December 15, 2000 (United States)
- Running time: 83 minutes
- Country: United States
- Language: English
- Budget: $13 million
- Box office: $73.2 million

Dude, Where's My Car? is a 2000 American science fiction stoner comedy film directed by Danny Leiner. The film stars Ashton Kutcher and Seann William Scott as two best friends who find themselves unable to remember where they parked their vehicle after a night of recklessness, ultimately uncovering a conspiracy that threatens the universe. Supporting cast members include Kristy Swanson, Jennifer Garner, Marla Sokoloff, and Mary Lynn Rajskub.

Though the film was panned by most critics, it was a box office success for 20th Century Fox. The film's title became a minor pop-culture saying, and was commonly reworked in various pop-cultural contexts during the 2000s.

== Plot ==
Best friends and roommates Jesse Montgomery III and Chester Greenburg awaken with hangovers and no memory of the previous night. The answering machine contains an angry question from their twin girlfriends, Wilma and Wanda, as to their whereabouts. The two also learn that they have almost been fired from their pizza delivery jobs, and that the cabinets in their kitchen are full of containers of pudding. They emerge from their home to find Jesse's car missing and, with it, their girlfriends' first anniversary presents. Because the girls have promised them a "special treat", which Jesse and Chester take to mean sexual intercourse, the boys desperately begin retracing their steps in an attempt to discover where they left the car.

Along the way, they encounter a transgender stripper, a belligerent speaker box operator at a Chinese restaurant's drive-through, two tattoos on each other's backs, UFO cultists led by Zoltan (who later hold the twins hostage), a Cantonese-speaking Chinese tailor, the Zen-minded Nelson and his cannabis-loving dog Jackal, beautiful Christie Boner, her aggressive jock boyfriend Tommy and his friends, two hard-nosed police detectives, and a reclusive French ostrich farmer named Pierre. They also encounter two groups of aliens: one group consists of five attractive women, and the other comprises two Norwegian men, all of whom are searching for the "Continuum Transfunctioner" —an extraterrestrial device that Jesse and Chester accidentally acquired the night before.

The search for both the car and the Transfunctioner leads Jesse and Chester to the local arcade and mini-golf course, Captain Stu's Space-O-Rama. Once inside, they encounter Zoltan and his cultists, who give them Wilma and Wanda in exchange for a toy that Jesse and Chester try to pass off as the Transfunctioner. Tommy, Christie, and the jocks arrive along with Nelson and his dog, whom they release after Tommy snatches the fake Transfunctioner from Zoltan. The two sets of aliens arrive and reveal that the toy is not the Transfunctioner; moments later, Chester finishes solving a Rubik's Cube, which shapeshifts into the real Continuum Transfunctioner.

The boys are warned that once the five lights on the device stop flashing, the universe will be destroyed. Jesse and Chester must determine which group of aliens is there to protect the universe and which is there to destroy it. Both claim to be the protectors of the universe, stating that they were with Jesse and Chester the previous night, which Jesse and Chester still cannot remember. The two correctly choose the Norwegian men after they successfully answer their question about the previous night by stating they got a hole-in-one at the 18th hole at the arcade's miniature golf park and won a lifetime supply of pudding. They deactivate the Transfunctioner, saving the universe.

Enraged, the five alien women merge into a beautiful 50-foot giantess clad in a purple bra and matching miniskirt. She swallows Tommy whole in front of Christie (who reacts with indifference), and gives chase to Jesse and Chester. The cultists tell them to activate the Photon Accelerator Annihilation Beam on the Transfunctioner. However, the button that activates it is too far in to reach. Chester suddenly remembers a nature show from earlier in the day, with chimpanzees using sticks to gather food through small holes, and applies the same logic with a straw to push the recessed button, destroying the alien. Tommy survives, but Christie breaks up with him in favor of Nelson.

The protectors thank Jesse, Chester, and the twins for saving the world, and erase their memories of the adventure. The protectors park the duo's car, a Renault Le Car, behind a mail truck for them to find the following morning. Jesse and Chester salvage their relationships with the twins and discover that the special treat from the girls is matching berets with Jesse's and Chester's names embroidered in the front. The protectors leave a gift for their girlfriends, and for them by extension: breast enhancement necklaces. Jesse, Chester, and the twins go out for Chinese food in Jesse's car while arguing about what their tattoos say.

== Cast ==
- Ashton Kutcher as Jesse Montgomery III
- Seann William Scott as Chester Greenburg
- Kristy Swanson as Christie Boner
- Jennifer Garner as Wanda
- Marla Sokoloff as Wilma
- David Herman as Nelson
- Hal Sparks as Zoltan
- Charlie O'Connell as Tommy
- Mary Lynn Rajskub as Zelmina
- Teressa Tunney as Tania
- Freda Foh Shen as Chinese Foooood Lady (voice)
- John Toles-Bey as Mr. Pizzacoli
- James Vincent as Jeff
- Keone Young as Mr. Lee
- Joanna Bacalso as Bartender
- Erik Audé as Musclehead
- Jodi Ann Paterson as Super Hot Giant Alien
- Mitzi Martin as Jumpsuit Chick #1
- Cleo King as Impound Officer
- Pat Finn as Rick
- Brent Spiner as Pierre (uncredited)
- Andy Dick as Mark (uncredited)

== Production ==
Screenwriter Philip Stark wrote the screenplay in 1998 while living in a small Hollywood apartment. At the time, teen comedies were experiencing a massive resurgence following the success of American Pie (1999), which starred Seann William Scott. He has since joked that the film was essentially a biopic of his life at the time: he spent most of his days smoking weed and eating takeout Chinese food, much like the main characters, Jesse and Chester. Stark aimed to blend the slapstick energy of the Marx Brothers with the stoner vibes of Cheech and Chong, all while incorporating the burgeoning "random" humor of the early internet era. The film's title is derived from the line "Dude, where's your car" from the 1998 film The Big Lebowski. Stark has mentioned that early drafts were influenced by post-Kantian philosophy. He viewed the "search for the car" as a metaphor for the search for meaning in a chaotic universe, though this was eventually buried under layers of sci-fi absurdity and "And then?" jokes. Stark wanted to take the "absurd logic" of stoner comedies and apply it to two "lovable knuckleheads" whose primary motivation was simply making their girlfriends happy. The film benefited from Stark's connections in television; at the time, he was a writer on That '70s Show, which gave him a direct line to Ashton Kutcher. He sold the script to 20th Century Fox for a mid-six-figure sum, which was considered a massive win for a first-time feature writer at the time. That '70's Show aired on the Fox Network, which News Corporation owned along with 20th Century Fox. Glenn Whitehead adding content to the script.

Before the final duo was cast, both Seth Rogen and Jake Gyllenhaal auditioned for the lead roles. The script was offered to Jason Reitman twice, but he turned it down both times. Hal Hartley, too, turned down the offer to direct. Television director Danny Leiner initially thought the title was "crazy" but signed on because he found the "bizarre adventure" of the script uniquely funny and non-derivative of other teen comedies of the era.

Fresh off his success as Stifler in American Pie, Scott was cast as Chester. The studio wanted to pair the two biggest young comedic actors of the moment to guarantee a "frat-boy" audience. Jennifer Garner was cast as one of "The Twins." This film remains one of the few instances where she played a broad comedic role.

Principal photography took place during 2000 in North Hollywood, Santa Clarita, and Glendale, California. Scenes containing the fictional restaurant "Chinese Foooood" were filmed in Burbank, California. This scene at the Chinese food drive-thru was actually based on a real-life frustration Stark had with repetitive service, which he exaggerated into a surrealist loop. Leiner pushed for a visual style that felt like a comic book. He insisted on the inclusion of the "Zoltan" cult and the giant "Super-Hot Giant Alien" to move the movie away from a standard road trip film and into the realm of sci-fi surrealism.

The film was made for roughly $13 million, which was quite low for a major studio release. Because of this, many of the special effects such as the "Continuum Transfunctioner" and the space elements were intentionally designed to look slightly low-rent or "cheesy" to match the stoner aesthetic. The "Continuum Transfunctioner" prop used in the film was actually a modified Rubik's Cube-style toy combined with various electronic parts.

== Release ==
The production team originally faced a potential R-rating due to the drug-culture undertones. However, the studio pushed for a PG-13 rating to capture the high school demographic. To achieve this, the film never actually shows anyone smoking marijuana; the characters are just perpetually "confused" or "in a haze". On December 10, 2000, the premiere of the film was held on the Fox Studio Lot in Century City, California, before its wide release in the United States on December 15, 2000.

=== Critical response ===
On the review aggregator website Rotten Tomatoes, 16% of 62 critics' reviews are positive, with an average rating of 3.7/10. The website's consensus reads: "The movie isn't funny, the plot is too thin, and the production values feel more like a TV sitcom than a movie." Metacritic, which uses a weighted average, assigned the film a score of 30 out of 100, based on 17 critics, indicating "generally unfavorable" reviews. Audiences polled by CinemaScore gave the film an average grade of "B−" on an A+ to F scale.

The BBC Films review gave it 1 star, calling the film "a lame-brained travesty" and "intensely irritating", and Kutcher and Scott's routines "painfully unamusing". USA Today said: "Any civilization that can produce a movie this stupid probably deserves to be hit by famine and pestilence." The Chicago Tribune said: "At the end of 83 unmerciful minutes, audiences will be exclaiming, 'Dude, I can't believe I sat through that movie!?'" and the New York Post said that it was: "An almost chuckle-free mess, so amateurish and lame that the cast often has that embarrassed look you see on dogs given ridiculous haircuts." However, the New York Daily News did praise the "surprisingly sweet-natured pairing" of Kutcher and Scott. In 2014, Adam Boult of The Guardian listed the film as a "guilty pleasure", saying Kutcher and Scott were underrated as comedic performers and while the film overall was disjointed, it was nonetheless "packed with so many throw-away gags and Dadaist one liners it's impossible to absorb them all in a single sitting".

=== Box office ===
The film opened at number 2 at the North American box office, grossing US$13.8 million in its opening weekend behind the Paramount Pictures release What Women Want, which opened at the top spot with US$33 million. Its overall gross came to $46 million in the US and $73.2 million in total worldwide from a $13 million budget.

=== Home media and rights ===
The DVD was released on June 26, 2001, by 20th Century Fox Home Entertainment. This release included 7 deleted and extended scenes, an audio commentary with Kutcher, Scott, and Leiner, a behind-the-scenes featurette, the music video for Grand Theft Audio's "Stoopid Ass", TV spots, and the theatrical trailer. The VHS version was released on November 6, 2001. In Australia (Region 4), it was released on VHS on September 26, 2001, by 20th Century Fox Home Entertainment South Pacific, with the DVD following in early 2002. In the United Kingdom (Region 2) it was released on home video on December 10, 2001. 20th Century Fox Home Entertainment later released it on Blu-ray in 2008; the only special feature is the inclusion of the original theatrical trailer.

In 2019, Rupert Murdoch sold most of 21st Century Fox's film and television assets to Disney, and Dude, Where's My Car? was one of the films included in the deal. In the United States, Disney made it available on Hulu, which was one of the additional assets they acquired from Fox in the 2019 sale. It was also made available to stream on Disney+ in some international markets without Hulu.

== Music ==
Dude, Where's My Car? Motion Picture Soundtrack

Soundtrack album by Various artists
- Released: December 12, 2000
- Genres: Alternative rock; pop-punk
- Length: 39:54
- Label: London-Sire

The soundtrack for the film was released December 15, 2000, by London-Sire Records.

=== Soundtrack ===
1. "Stoopid Ass" – Grand Theft Audio
2. "Playmate of the Year" – Zebrahead
3. "Lighting the Way" – Superdrag
4. "I'm Afraid of Britney Spears" – Liveonrelease
5. "Authenticity" – Harvey Danger
6. "Voodoo Lady" – Ween
7. "Listen to the Music" – Dangerman
8. "So Cal Loco (Party Like a Rockstar)" – Sprung Monkey
9. "We Luv U" – Grand Theft Audio
10. "Lunatic" – Silt
11. "Sorry About Your Luck" – Spy
12. "Bust a Move" – Young MC

=== Other songs ===
The following songs were featured in the film but not included in the soundtrack.

- "It Could Be You" – Blur
- "Come On, Come On" – Smash Mouth
- "You Sexy Thing" – Hot Chocolate
- "Claire Danes Poster" – Size 14
- "Let it Ride" – Spy
- "Right Now" – SR-71
- "American Psycho" – Treble Charger
- "Here We Go" (Radio Edit) - Freestylers
- "The Bubble Bunch" – Jimmy Spicer
- "Zoltan's Theme" – turtle?
- "Little Things" – Good Charlotte
- "What I Believe" – Sum 41
- "Bakhuphuka Izwe Lonke" – Ladysmith Black Mambazo
- "Sitar Dude" – Terry Wilson
- "Pachelbel's Canon" – written by Johann Pachelbel, arranged by Lee Ashley
- "La Marseillaise" – written by Claude Joseph Rouget de Lisle

== Possible sequel ==
A sequel titled Seriously Dude, Where's My Car? was planned at Fox circa 2003, but became stuck in development hell for several years and never materialized. In 2016, Kutcher confirmed the existence of a script for the sequel and further elaborated he would potentially consider being open to reprising his role should it enter production. In August 2017, Scott discussed his interest in making a sequel and that he would desire it to be rated R and "dark and really weird". This interview with Scott took place a few days before it was announced that Rupert Murdoch wanted to sell 21st Century Fox to Disney.

== Legacy ==
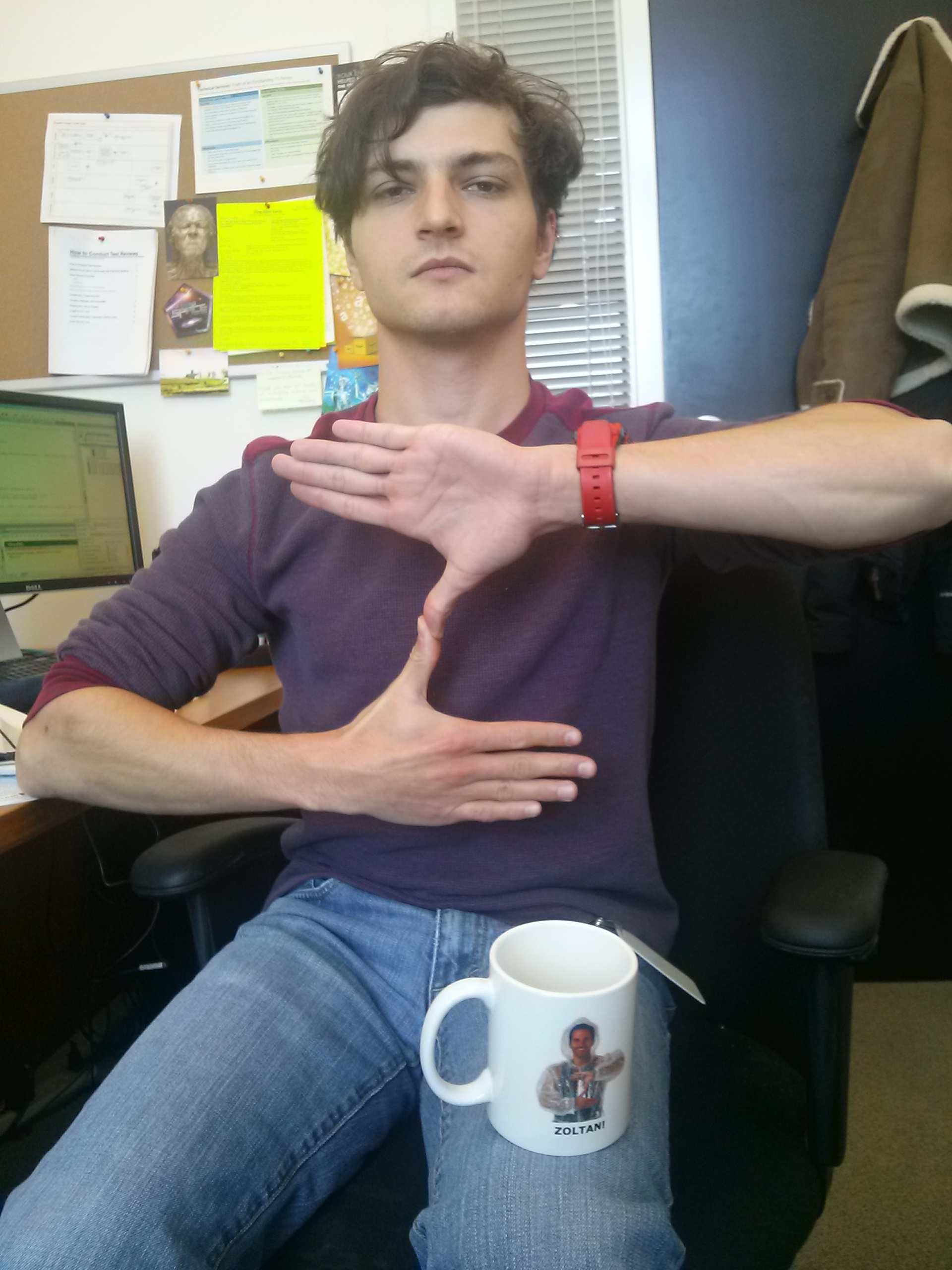
A man making the "Zoltan" hand gesture

In 2012, the Pittsburgh Pirates started using the "Zoltan" hand signal from the film as a way for players to congratulate their teammates after an accomplishment such as a home run or a double play. The habit started after the Pirates (in particular Neil Walker) were watching Dude, Where's My Car? in the visiting clubhouse at Turner Field in Atlanta during an April 2012 weekend series against the Atlanta Braves. After a Twitter campaign to encourage the "real" Zoltan to appear at a game, Hal Sparks flew to Pittsburgh on July 25, 2012, to throw out the ceremonial first pitch, and was on hand to see the Pirates win 3–2 over his hometown team, the Chicago Cubs. Also there to support the team was Hal's girlfriend, Summer Soltis, whose family is from the area and are Pirates fans themselves. Despite picking up a cult following in Pittsburgh and helping the team contend in the playoff race well into September, the Pirates finished with a 79–83 record, extending their major North American professional sports record to 20 consecutive losing seasons before ultimately breaking their drought in 2013.

Stark has admitted to "cringing" at some of the jokes. In recent interviews for The Hollywood Reporter and Cracked.com, he noted that much of the humor, specifically jokes involving ethnic minorities, transgender people, and gay men, felt "appropriate" for the edgy comedy landscape of 2000 but feels dated and offensive today. He has stated that the film "would never be made today," not just because of its humor, but because the "mid-budget studio comedy" has largely vanished from the theatrical market.
