= Kaya Wittenburg =

American model

- Born: David Christopher Wittenburg; August 24, 1972 (age 54); Wisconsin
- Education: Marquette University
- Occupations: Businessman, Model, Actor
- Years active: 2001–present
- Known for: TV, Modeling
- Height: 1.88

Kaya Wittenburg (born August 24, 1972, in Wisconsin) is a fashion model, businessman and actor from the United States. He is best known for his international modeling career, walking runways in Europe, Asia, Africa, and South America.

He appeared on a number of TV shows, including season one of Temptation Island, and created and produced a reality television series based on his modeling agency Ocean Models, based in Miami, Florida.

== Early life ==
Wittenburg was born in Brookfield, Wisconsin, to his mother, a real estate agent, and his father, a transportation executive. He began life with ambitions for a career in television, but due to the lack of opportunities in Wisconsin, he started pursuing a career in medicine, studying biology and psychology at Marquette University in Milwaukee. While at university, he worked as an anesthesia technician. After graduation he worked at a hospital in Arizona, which he left to pursue a career in modeling.

== Career ==
=== Modeling ===
While working at a hospital in Arizona, Wittenburg met the owner of a modeling agency based in Italy who gave him representation in Milan. He went on to work for the designer Gianni Versace for fitting, print and runway work. Wittenburg then spent the next several years working across the globe as an international fashion model. He was one of the top 100 male models in the world ; walking runways in Europe, Asia, Africa and South America, and worked for designers Giorgio Armani, Hugo Boss, Gianni Versace and Carol Pignatelli.

=== TV and films ===
Since modeling, Wittenburg has appeared in a number of TV shows, beginning with Fox's reality series Temptation Island with his then girlfriend, Valerie Penso. After the show, he was interviewed by Jay Leno, and appeared in a number of TV shows including MTV's A Perfect Date and the USA Network's Cannonball Run 2001.

Wittenburg has also appeared in a number of TV shows as a fashion expert, including the BBC documentary The Hollywood Stories and ITV's GMTV. Wittenburg has also appeared as himself and won a Celebrity Newsmakers episode of The Weakest Link, as well as on the premiere episode of the short-lived 2003 game show Dirty Rotten Cheater.

In 2013 Wittenburg created and produced a reality TV series, Ocean Models, directed by Josh Souza.

=== Finding Exhilaration ===
Wittenburg is the co-author (with Valerie Penso) of an autobiographical book about their careers, called Finding Exhilaration, published by Trafford in 2002.

== Business ==
After his TV appearances, Wittenburg moved into business, first in real estate and later opening his own modeling agency. After working for Majestic Properties he went on to be the President of Titanium X Global Properties. In 2010 Wittenburg founded Ocean Models with co-founder Josh Souza, based in Miami. Models from the agency have been photographed in Vogue and Elle Magazine. He also founded Miami based real estate firm Sky Five Properties.

Wittenburg was on the board of directors for the Miami Beach Chamber of Commerce from 2007 to 2008. In 2007 Wittenberg was judge of Rothschild Business Planning Competition at the University of Miami.

== Filmography ==
Year	Title	Role	Notes
2001	10 Attitudes	Andrew	
2001	Temptation Island	Himself	
2001	Weakest Link	Himself	
2002	Son of the Beach	Reality Man	
2002	Dog Eat Dog	Himself	
