= Blame Everyone =

Studio album by Grand Theft Audio
- Released: 3 October 2000
- Recorded: 1998–2000
- Genre: Alternative rock; alternative metal; indie rock; indietronica
- Length: 47:04
- Label: London-Sire Records
- Producer: Grand Theft Audio

Grand Theft Audio chronology
| Blame Everyone (2000) | Pass Me the Conch (2022) |

Singles from Blame Everyone
- 1. "We Luv U" Released: 22 September 2000; 2. "Stoopid Ass" Released: 30 January 2001

Blame Everyone is the debut studio album released by British rock band Grand Theft Audio, which received generally positive reviews. It was released in October 2000 in the United Kingdom under London-Sire Records.

== Singles ==
The album features two singles: "Stoopid Ass" and "We Luv U". Both of these songs have appeared in the UK Top 1000 charts and have been soundtracks for the movie Dude, Where's My Car?. The songs "Avarice", "Wake Up" (shown as "Wake Up In Your Own Mind"), "Dead Man Leaving" and "As Good As It Gets" appeared on the 2001 racing simulation video game Gran Turismo 3: A-Spec on PlayStation 2.

== Track listing ==
| No. | Title | Writer(s) | Length |
|---|---|---|---|
| 1. | "Death To The Infidels" | Ritch Battersby / Jay Butler / Ralph Jezzard | 5:07 |
| 2. | "We Luv U" | Battersby / Jezzard | 3:22 |
| 3. | "Stoopid Ass" | Battersby / Butler / Jezzard | 4:10 |
| 4. | "Rock The House" | Battersby / Jezzard | 3:57 |
| 5. | "Wake Up" | Battersby / Butler / Jezzard | 3:54 |
| 6. | "Grey, Black & White" | Battersby / Butler / Jezzard | 4:56 |
| 7. | "As Good As It Gets" | Battersby / Butler / Jezzard | 4:18 |
| 8. | "Drugs And Girls" | Battersby / Butler / Jezzard | 3:29 |
| 9. | "Avarice" | Battersby / Butler / Jezzard | 3:46 |
| 10. | "Dead Man Leaving: I. "Dead Man Leaving" 3:44; II. "Silence" 6:07; III. "Hidden Track - Idea For A Song" 0:14" | Butler | 10:03 |
| Total length: | | | 47:04 |
