= Mandy Lauderdale =

American singer (born 1979)

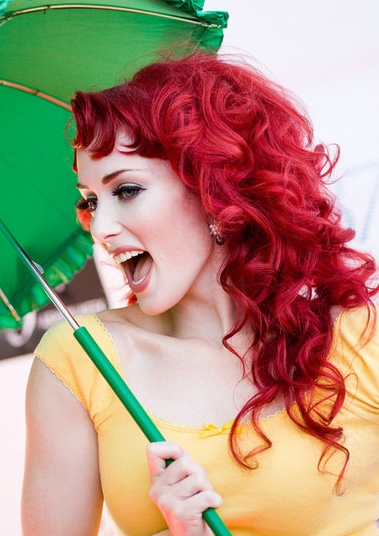
- Mandy Lauderdale

Background information
- Born: 1979 (age 46–47)
- Origin: Atlanta, Georgia, United States
- Genres: Cabaret, blues lounge
- Occupation: International Cabaret Star
- Years active: 2001– Present

Mandy Lauderdale is a cabaret singer from Atlanta, Georgia, and former reality TV personality and MTV VJ. She first garnered attention on the Fox television series Temptation Island. Lauderdale contributed vocals to the platinum-selling band Rehab song, "More Like You".

== Early career ==
Lauderdale first rose to prominence as a castaway on the Fox reality series Temptation Island in 2001, which led to appearances on various talk shows and magazines around that same time. Subsequently, she was a VJ for MTV in 2001 for the Summer in the Keys, in addition to hosting Hot Zone and TRL, co-hosting Carmen Electra’s Hypermix and judging Sink or Swim and Say What? Karaoke. Lauderdale also worked on-camera with Dave Holmes, Usher, Mandy Moore, Alicia Keys, Backstreet Boys, Jake Gyllenhaal, Ashton Kutcher, Good Charlotte, Molly Sims and Rehab.

== Later career ==
Two of her songs, "Mister Stevens" and "Champagne Champagne", were featured in the film Deeper and Deeper. In early 2010, she earned her esthetician's license and released an organic skincare line, "Little Dab". Lauderdale was one of the headliners on the Dos Equis "Most Interesting Show in the World" tour in 2010, where she debuted her alter egos Bella Morningstar and Leipchen Chantilly. Currently, Mandy's song "Champagne Champagne" is being featured internationally in all of the MAC Cosmetics stores.

== Discography ==
=== Studio albums ===
- I Done Done It (Self Released)

=== Singles ===
- "Champagne, Champagne"
- "I'll Take You to the Moon"

=== Features ===
"More Like You" Rehab ft. Mandy Lauderdale

== TV and movie appearances ==
- MTV Summer in the Keys, 2001
- Temptation Island, 2001
- Live with Regis and Kelly, 2001
- The Tonight Show with Jay Leno, 2001
- The Howard Stern Radio Show, 2001
- Total Request Live, 2001
- Road Trip (cameo), 2000

== Recognition ==
She was nominated for both the Teen Choice Awards and TV Guide Awards, and won an award on the Kathy Griffin Really Awards. She was also awarded “Diva of the Year” by FAMSPA.

Lauderdale has been featured in two books: 400 Years Of Music, Entertainment and Showbiz and The Cabaret World and Who's Who from 1730 to the Present, both written by Maximillien De Lafayette.
