= Temptation Island (TV series) =

American reality television series

- Genre: Reality television
- Presented by: Mark L. Walberg
- Country of origin: United States
- Original language: English
- No. of seasons: 10
- No. of episodes: 97

Production
- Executive producers: Jean-Michel Michenaud (seasons 1–3); Chris Cowan (seasons 1–3); David Goldberg; David Friedman
- Production locations: Ambergris Caye, Belize (season 1); Roatán, Bay Islands (season 3); Maui, Hawaii (season 7); Kona, Hawaii (season 8)
- Running time: 42 minutes
- Production companies: Rocket Science Laboratories (2001–2003); Banijay Studios North America (2019–present)

Original release
- Network: Fox
- Release: January 10, 2001 – September 29, 2003
- Network: USA Network
- Release: January 15, 2019 – August 23, 2023
- Network: Netflix
- Release: March 12, 2025 – present

Temptation Island is an American reality television series originally broadcast by Fox. The series premiered on January 10, 2001, and it concluded with its third season on September 29, 2003. Temptation Island depicted four unmarried couples who traveled to a tropical island to have their fidelity tested. The couples were separated from one another for two weeks, in which they were required to commingle with a group of single members of the opposite sex whose purpose was to persuade the couples to have an affair. The series drew intense backlash due to its controversial premise; however, it averaged high ratings over the course of its first season. The series is hosted by American television presenter Mark L. Walberg.

In 2018, USA Network announced that it planned to revive Temptation Island. The first season of this revival premiered on January 15, 2019. In 2024, the series moved from USA to Netflix.

== Production ==
Logos

Seasons 1–3

Seasons 4–8

The first season of the show was filmed on Ambergris Caye in Belize. Season 1 premiered on January 10, 2001, and aired its finale on February 28, 2001. The debut episode drew 16 million viewers. The show attracted controversy from the outset, which Fox hoped would drive ratings. Four male contestants lived in one section with a dozen female models, and the four female contestants lived in another section with a dozen attractive men. The initial couples were Kaya Wittenburg and Valerie Penso, Mandy Lauderdale and Billy Cleary, Ytossie Patterson and Taheed Watson, and Andy Lukei and Shannon Roghair. Producers removed Patterson and Watson from the show when they learned that the pair had children together. The remaining three couples continued.

Season 2 premiered on October 31, 2001, and delivered poor ratings. After a nearly two-year layoff, a third edition of the series premiered on August 28, 2003. Like Season 2, Season 3 also delivered poor ratings.

Mark L. Walberg hosted all three editions. Reruns once aired on Hulu, but are no longer available there.

A revamped version of the show, once again hosted by Walberg, premiered on the USA Network on January 15, 2019. USA Network announced the show was renewed for a fifth season on February 26, 2019. On August 22, 2019, it was announced that the fifth season would premiere on October 10, 2019.

On January 28, 2021, it was announced that the sixth season would premiere on February 16, 2021.

On January 26, 2024, it was reported that the series would be moving from USA Network to Netflix.

On April 17, 2025, Netflix renewed the series for a tenth season.

On May 7, 2026, Netflix renewed the series for an eleventh season.

== Episodes ==
Season	Episodes	Originally released		
Season	Episodes	First released	Last released	Network
1	8	January 10, 2001	February 28, 2001	Fox
2	12	October 31, 2001	February 14, 2002	Fox
3	8	August 28, 2003	September 29, 2003	Fox
4	12	January 15, 2019	March 26, 2019	USA Network
5	12	October 10, 2019	December 19, 2019	USA Network
6	12	February 16, 2021	April 27, 2021	USA Network
7	12	March 16, 2022	May 25, 2022	USA Network
8	12	June 14, 2023	August 23, 2023	USA Network
9	10	March 12, 2025		Netflix
10	9	April 10, 2026		Netflix

== Reception ==
Temptation Island received mixed reviews from critics. Michael Speier of Variety negatively compared the series to Survivor, referring to it as "merely a lightweight libido experiment." Ken Tucker of Entertainment Weekly believed the series to be "creepy-cheesy", in which he assigned it a grade of C−.

== Viewership ==
According to data from Showlabs, Temptation Island ranked eighth on Netflix in the United States during the week of 17–23 March 2025.

== Couples ==
=== Season 1 ===
#	Couple	Occupation	Hometown	# Years Dating	Status	Notes
1	Kaya Wittenburg	Model	Miami Beach, FL	1.5 years	Dating	They left the island together
1	Valerie Penso	Real Estate Agent	Miami Beach, FL	1.5 years	Dating	They left the island together
2	Billy Cleary	Aspiring Actor	Atlanta, GA	1.5 years	Split	They left the island together but split up before the reunion episode
2	Mandy Lauderdale	Aspiring Singer	Atlanta, GA	1.5 years	Split	They left the island together but split up before the reunion episode
3	Taheed Watson	Actor	Los Angeles, CA	5.5 years	Dating	They were disqualified from the show when it was revealed they had a child together.
3	Ytossie Patterson	Actress	Los Angeles, CA	5.5 years	Dating	They were disqualified from the show when it was revealed they had a child together.
4	Andy Lukei	Owner of Pacific Coast Kayaking	Malibu, CA	5 years	Married	They got engaged after the final bonfire and were married in a special reunion episode
4	Shannon Roghair	Lawyer	Malibu, CA	5 years	Married	They got engaged after the final bonfire and were married in a special reunion episode

=== Season 2 ===
#	Couple	Occupation	Hometown	# Years Dating	Status	Notes
1	Edmundo Cruz	Waiter	Chicago, IL	3 years	Split	They left the bonfire together but split up soon afterwards
1	Catherine Chiarelli	Dancer/Singer	Chicago, IL	3 years	Split	They left the bonfire together but split up soon afterwards
2	John Dolan	Bartender	Phoenix, AZ	10 months	Dating	They left the island together
2	Shannon Rutledge	Sales	Phoenix, AZ	10 months	Dating	They left the island together
3	Tony Schmitt	Sales Account Executive	Ferndale, MI	4.5 years	Engaged	Left the show after episode 5 and chose to get engaged
3	Genevieve Deittrick	Business Owner	Ferndale, MI	4.5 years	Engaged	Left the show after episode 5 and chose to get engaged
4	Thomas McGuan	Fleet Service Clerk / Model	Chicago, IL	3.5 years	Split	They both decided to end the relationship
4	Nikkole Palmatier	Bartender	Chicago, IL	3.5 years	Split	They both decided to end the relationship
5	Mark Detrio	Police Officer	Tampa, FL	1.4 years	Split	Joined the show in episode 6 Kelley broke up with Mark and they left the island alone
5	Kelley Sutphin	Bartender / Student	Tampa, FL	1.4 years	Split	Joined the show in episode 6 Kelley broke up with Mark and they left the island alone

=== Season 3 ===
#	Couple	Occupation	Hometown	# Years Dating	Status	Notes
1	Michael Pulice	Bartender / Model	Long Island, NY	2 years	Split	Melissa broke up with Michael and they left the island alone
1	Melissa Huggins	Promoter / Model	Long Island, NY	2 years	Split	Melissa broke up with Michael and they left the island alone
2	Erik Hebert	Caterer	Farmville, VA	3 years	Dating	They left the island together
2	Kristin Cobb	Student	Farmville, VA	3 years	Dating	They left the island together
3	Anthony	Sales Manager	Chicago, IL	3 years	Split	They broke up and left the island alone
3	Stephanie Cantu	Hairstylist / Model	Chicago, IL	3 years	Split	They broke up and left the island alone
4	Jason	Massage Therapist	Las Vegas, NV	1 year	Split	Kara broke up with Jason and they left the island alone
4	Kara	Receptionist	Las Vegas, NV	1 year	Split	Kara broke up with Jason and they left the island alone

=== Season 4 ===
#	Couple	Occupation	Hometown	# Years Dating	Status	Notes
1	Javen Butler	Senior Records Clerk	San Francisco, CA	8 years	Engaged	They got engaged on the show.
1	Shari Ligons	Recruiter / Human Resources	San Francisco, CA	8 years	Engaged	They got engaged on the show.
2	Karl Collins	Para-Professional Educator	Chicago, IL	2.5 years	Split	They broke up on the show, but later got back together. According to Screenrant 2023, they are no longer together.
2	Nicole Tutewohl	Sales Executive	Chicago, IL	2.5 years	Split	They broke up on the show, but later got back together. According to Screenrant 2023, they are no longer together.
3	John Thurmond	Business Owner	Fort Worth, TX	3 years	Split	On the show, John dated Katheryn and Kady dated Johnny. Both are now single.
3	Kady Krambeer	Marketer	Fort Worth, TX	3 years	Split	On the show, John dated Katheryn and Kady dated Johnny. Both are now single.
4	Evan Smith	Professional Trainer	Los Angeles, CA	5 years	Split	Evan is the son of Gavin Smith. On the show, Evan broke up with Kaci to begin a relationship with Morgan Lolar. Evan and Morgan became engaged after the show but they ended the relationship the following year. Morgan and Kaci are now on good terms.
4	Kaci Campbell	Business Owner	Los Angeles, CA	5 years	Split	Evan is the son of Gavin Smith. On the show, Evan broke up with Kaci to begin a relationship with Morgan Lolar. Evan and Morgan became engaged after the show but they ended the relationship the following year. Morgan and Kaci are now on good terms.

=== Season 5 ===
#	Couple	Occupation	Hometown	# Years Dating	Status	Notes
1	Kate Griffith	Sales Executive	Hoboken, NJ	3 years	Split	David left with Toneata, but the two later split; David and Kate got back together, but later split again.
1	David Benavidez	Sales Executive	Hoboken, NJ	3 years	Split	David left with Toneata, but the two later split; David and Kate got back together, but later split again.
2	Esonica Veira	Miss Universe US Virgin Islands 2017	Decatur, GA	6 years	Split	Esonica left with Kareem, but the two later split.
2	Gavin Rocker	Private Security	Decatur, GA	6 years	Split	Esonica left with Kareem, but the two later split.
3	Ashley Howland	Dental Assistant	Deland, FL	1.5 years	Split	Casey proposed to Ashley who rejected the proposal; Ashley left with Ben, but the two later split.
3	Casey Starchak	Online Sales	Deland, FL	1.5 years	Split	Casey proposed to Ashley who rejected the proposal; Ashley left with Ben, but the two later split.
4	Ashley Goldson	Store Manager	Boston, MA	4 years	Split	Ashley and Rick decided to leave together, but the two later split.
4	Rick Fleur	Model	Boston, MA	4 years	Split	Ashley and Rick decided to leave together, but the two later split.

=== Season 6 ===
#	Couple	Occupation	Hometown	# Years Dating	Status	Notes
1	Chelsea Orcutt	Marketing Coordinator	West Hollywood, CA	1 year	Dating	Chelsea and Tom decided to leave the island together.
1	Thomas Gipson	Actor	West Hollywood, CA	1 year	Dating	Chelsea and Tom decided to leave the island together.
2	Erica Washington	Personal Assistant	Los Angeles, CA	2 years	Split	Erica broke things off with Kendal and left the island alone. Kendal left the island with Alexcys, but Alexcys broke things off shortly after.
2	Kendal Kirkland	Business Owner	Los Angeles, CA	2 years	Split	Erica broke things off with Kendal and left the island alone. Kendal left the island with Alexcys, but Alexcys broke things off shortly after.
3	Erin Smith	Behavioral Therapist	San Diego, CA	1.5 years	Split	The couple left the island together. Erin broke up with Corey at the reunion, and no longer follow each other on social media.
3	Corey Sobczyk	Concierge Manager	San Diego, CA	1.5 years	Split	The couple left the island together. Erin broke up with Corey at the reunion, and no longer follow each other on social media.
4	Kristen Ramos	Physical Therapist	Sewell, NJ	11 years	Married	Kristen and Julian are high school sweethearts. Before they left the island together, Julian proposed and Kristen accepted. They married in July 2022.
4	Julian Allen	Personal Trainer	Sewell, NJ	11 years	Married	Kristen and Julian are high school sweethearts. Before they left the island together, Julian proposed and Kristen accepted. They married in July 2022.

=== Season 7 ===
#	Couple	Occupation	Hometown	# Years Dating	Status	Notes
1	Ashley Rodriguez	Content Producer	Queens, NY	7 years	Split	Initially Ashley decided to leave with Lascelles, but changed her mind to leave the island alone. Lascelles decided to leave the island with Trace. By the reunion show, Lascelles and Trace were no longer together. Lascelles also made out with Alexa and Meghan at a club after the show finished filming.
1	Lascelles Lagares	Recruiter / Personal Trainer	Queens, NY	7 years	Split	Initially Ashley decided to leave with Lascelles, but changed her mind to leave the island alone. Lascelles decided to leave the island with Trace. By the reunion show, Lascelles and Trace were no longer together. Lascelles also made out with Alexa and Meghan at a club after the show finished filming.
2	Iris Jardiel	Entrepreneur	Seattle, WA	6 years	Split	Engaged on the show but later split.
2	Luke Wechselberger	Entrepreneur	Seattle, WA	6 years	Split	Engaged on the show but later split.
3	Gillian Lieberman	Realtor	West Palm Beach, FL	4 years	Split	They both decided to end the relationship. Gillian left the island alone and Edgar left the island with Marissa. Marissa and Edgar later split.
3	Edgar De Santiago	Customer Experience Specialist	Indianapolis, IN	4 years	Split	They both decided to end the relationship. Gillian left the island alone and Edgar left the island with Marissa. Marissa and Edgar later split.
4	Hania Stocker	Garden Designer	Santa Fe, NM	1.5 years	Split	Hania proposed to Ash, but Ash said no. Ash decided to leave the island alone.
4	Ash Lamiroult	Writer	Santa Fe, NM	1.5 years	Split	Hania proposed to Ash, but Ash said no. Ash decided to leave the island alone.

=== Season 8 ===
#	Couple	Occupation	Hometown	# Years Dating	Status	Notes
1	Kaitlin Tufts	Fitness Studio Owner	Charleston, SC	8 years	Split	Hall ended the engagement during episode 8 of the show and chose to leave the island with Makayla while Kaitlin left alone.
1	Hall Toledano	Leather Sales	Charleston, SC	8 years	Split	Hall ended the engagement during episode 8 of the show and chose to leave the island with Makayla while Kaitlin left alone.
2	Leonila "Paris" Pedro	Influencer	Newark, NJ	1.8 years	Split	Paris left the island with Tahjjic and Great left the island with Nafeesah but both couples broke up before the reunion
2	Nzubechukwu "Great" Ezihie	Engineer	New York, NY	1.8 years	Split	Paris left the island with Tahjjic and Great left the island with Nafeesah but both couples broke up before the reunion
3	Marisela Figueroa	Bartender	Atlanta, GA	2 years	Split	Marisela chose to leave the island single. Christopher decided to leave the island with Alexius, but they broke up after the show
3	Christopher Wells	Fitness Instructor	Atlanta, GA	2 years	Split	Marisela chose to leave the island single. Christopher decided to leave the island with Alexius, but they broke up after the show
4	Vanessa Valente	Military Contractor	Los Angeles, CA	1 year	Split	Left the island together but had split up by the reunion show
4	Roberto Mal	Army Veteran/Student	Los Angeles, CA	1 year	Split	Left the island together but had split up by the reunion show

== International versions ==
Country	Name	Host	Channel	First year aired
Argentina	Confianza ciega	Juan Castro	Canal 9	2001
Argentina Chile	La Isla de las Tentaciones	Florencia Peña; Benjamín Vicuña	Prime Video	August 9, 2024
Australia	Temptation Island	Peter Colquhoun	7 Network	December 21, 2002; 2019
Brazil	Ilha da Sedução	Babi Xavier	SBT	2002; 2003
Brazil	Ilha da Tentação	Flávia Alessandra; Otaviano Costa	Prime Video	2024
Bulgaria	Островът на изкушението Ostrovat na izkushenyeto	Vitomir Saraivanov	Nova TV	November 1, 2007 – January 18, 2008
Chile	Amor a Prueba	Karla Constant	Mega	December 1, 2014
Denmark	Temptation Island	Rikke Göransson	Viaplay	2026
Finland	Temptation Island Suomi	Sami Kuronen	Nelonen	2015–present
France	L'Île de la tentation	Stéphane Bouillaud; Céline Géraud	TF1	July 6, 2002 – August 26, 2008
France	L'Île de la tentation	Laurent Fontaine	Virgin 17	April 27, 2010 – June 18, 2010
France	L'Île de la tentation	Julie Taton	W9	July 2019
France	L'Île de la tentation	Delphine Wespiser	W9	January 18, 2024
Germany	Temptation Island – Versuchung im Paradies	Angela Finger-Erben (T1-T2); Lola Weippert (T3-¿?)	RTL	March 6, 2019 – present
Germany	Temptation Island VIP	Angela Finger-Erben (T1); Lola Weippert (T2-¿?)	RTL	October 18, 2020 – present
Hungary	A Kísértés	Balázs Sebestyén	RTL Klub	October 8, 2004 – December 23, 2004
Hungary	A Kísértés	Tibor Kasza	TV2	September 1, 2024 – present
India	Temptation Island India: Pyaar Ki Pariksha	Karan Kundrra; Mouni Roy	JioCinema	November 3, 2023 – present
Italy	Vero amore Temptation Island	Maria De Filippi (2005); Filippo Bisciglia (2014–2019; 2021; 2023–present); Alessia Marcuzzi (2020)	Canale 5	May 19, 2005 – June 9, 2005; July 3, 2014 – July 27, 2021; June 26, 2023 – present
Italy	Temptation Island VIP	Simona Ventura (2018); Alessia Marcuzzi (2019)	Canale 5	September 18, 2018 – October 14, 2019
Mexico	Confianza Ciega		SKY	2004
Mexico	Temptation Island	Sergio O’Farrill; Angie Taddei	Amazon Prime	July 5, 2024
Netherlands Belgium (Flanders)	Blind Vertrouwen	Wouter Nicolaas	V8	2001
Netherlands Belgium (Flanders)	Temptation Island	Tine Van den Brande and Ton van Royen	VT4; V8	2002
Netherlands Belgium (Flanders)	Temptation Island	Tine Van den Brande and Viktor Brand	VT4; SBS6	2003–2004
Netherlands Belgium (Flanders)	Temptation Island	Hans Otten and Tanja Jess	VT4; Veronica	2005–2006
Netherlands Belgium (Flanders)	Temptation Island	Véronique De Kock and Co Roworth	VT4; Veronica	2007
Netherlands Belgium (Flanders)	Temptation Island	Annelien Coorevits and Rick Brandsteder	VIJF; RTL 5	2016–2020
Netherlands Belgium (Flanders)	Temptation Island	Annelien Coorevits and Rijk Hofman	Streamz	2026–present
Netherlands	Temptation Island VIPS	Kaj Gorgels and Yolanthe Sneijder-Cabau	Videoland	2018–2019
Netherlands	Temptation Island: Love or Leave	Kaj Gorgels and Monica Geuze	Videoland	2020–2021
Philippines	Love In Temptation Island	None	TV5	Supposed airdate was on 2012; Cancelled
Poland	Temptation Island Polska	Michał Figurski	Polsat	September 6, 2023 – November 22, 2023
Portugal	Confiança Cega	Felipa Garnel	SIC	2001
Portugal	Ilha da Tentação	Carlos Ribeiro	TVI	2002
Romania	Temptation Island – Insula iubirii	Radu Vâlcan; Iulia Gheorghe	Antena 1	April 26, 2015 – present
Russia	Остров Искушений; Ostrov Iskushenij	Vladislav Galkin	REN TV	October 1, 2005 – December 25, 2005
Sweden Norway Denmark	Temptation Island	Pontus Gårdinger (2002); Pernille Aalund (2002); Martin Björk (2003)	Kanal 5 TVNorge; TVDanmark	2002–2003
Spain	Confianza Ciega	Francine Gálvez	Antena 3	January 2002
Spain	La Isla de las Tentaciones	Mónica Naranjo (T1); Sandra Barneda (T2-¿?)	Telecinco; Cuatro	January 9, 2020 – present
South Africa	Temptation Island South Africa	Phat Joe	Showmax	August 26, 2021 – November 25, 2021
United Kingdom	Temptation Island UK	Ed Hall	Sky1	September 23, 2001 – March 24, 2002
