= Jammin (2006 TV series) =

- Genre: Reality television
- Presented by: Rosanna Tavarez
- Country of origin: United States
- Original language: English
- No. of seasons: 2
- No. of episodes: 13

Production
- Producers: Tom Weber; Douglas Magnuson; Jennifer McGrogan
- Production location: Los Angeles

Original release
- Network: Sí TV
- Release: December 10, 2006 – July 6, 2008

Jammin was an original reality television series created by Sí TV that documents the attempts of six Latino bands to win a $10,000 cash prize and a Gibson sponsorship. Out of hundreds of bands that submitted entries, only the top fifteen bands, selected by online polling, advanced to the next round. A panel of expert judges then chose six semi-finalists based on their musical potential. The semi-finalists were flown to Los Angeles, where they received guidance from a series of mentors and given the chance to play live for the judges. Three finalists had the opportunity make their own music video and, finally, competed in a battle of the bands on-stage.

== Semi-finalists ==
The six semi-finalist bands, selected from the initial fifteen competitors by judges, were:

- Low Luster League
- Cuna De Lobos
- Velorio
- Spellbound Escape
- Mystery Hangup
- Zigmat

Low Luster League, Cuna de Lobos and Velorio went on to become finalists, with Low Luster League ultimately winning the competition.

== Judges and mentors ==
A total of eight mentors from the music industry, many of whom were associated with rock music, gave the semi-finalist bands support and advice. These were:

- John Doe
- John Densmore
- KC Porter
- Joan Jett
- Los Lobos
- Los Amigos Invisibles
- Dave Navarro
- Pitbull

== List of episodes ==
=== Season 1 ===
1. "Girl in a Coma Meets Joan Jett" (air date December 10, 2006)
2. "Upground Meets Los Lobos" (air date December 24, 2006)
3. "Blue Judy Meets John Densmore" (air date January 7, 2007)
4. "My Evolution Meets John Doe" (air date January 21, 2007)
5. "Hum Static Meet KC Porter" (air date February 3, 2007)

=== Season 2 ===
1. "Hotel California" (air date June 15, 2008)
2. "Free Fallin'" (air date June 15, 2008)
3. "All Day Today" (air date June 22, 2008)
4. "Running Out of Time" (air date June 22, 2008)
5. "Don't Stop" (air date June 29, 2008)
6. "Penguin Attack" (air date June 29, 2008)
7. "Start Me Up" (air date July 6, 2008)
8. "We are the Champions" (air date July 6, 2008)
