= Grand Theft Audio =

English alternative rock band

- Also known as: The Infidels
- Origin: London, England
- Genres: Alternative rock; indie rock; indietronica
- Years active: 1998–2003, 2020–present (one-off reunion: 2009)
- Labels: London-Sire; Technical Foul
- Spinoff of: The Infidels
- Members: Jay Butler; Ritch Battersby
- Past members: Ralph Jezzard; Chris McCormack

Grand Theft Audio are a English alternative rock band who formed in London in 1998. They were signed to London-Sire Records in 1999 and produced their only album at the time Blame Everyone in 2000 until the band split up in 2003 due to the record label being dissolved that year. Their original line-up was ex-3 Colours Red guitarist Chris McCormack, producer and bassist Ralph Jezzard, frontman; vocalist and ex-Real TV star Jay Butler and ex-The Wildhearts drummer Ritch Battersby. In 2020 the band, minus McCormack, announced on their website page that they were reforming with a new album in the works, leading to the release of their second album, Pass Me the Conch, in 2022. After Jezzard's departure, the band became a duo.

== Career ==
=== Formation and early years (1997–1999) ===
Grand Theft Audio were originally known as The Infidels, before the band learned of the existence of several other combos with the same moniker. They formed out of the friendship and musical rapport that had developed while its four members were in separate bands. The band name is a play on the action-adventure video game series Grand Theft Auto.

=== Blame Everyone, break-up and reunion (2000–2009) ===
The band's first album Blame Everyone was released on 3 October 2000. The album spawned two singles, "We Luv U" (UK number 70) on 24 March 2001 and "Stoopid Ass" on 23 April 2001. In 2003, the band's record label London-Sire Records went out of business, which eventually caused the band to split up. The band played a one-off reunion concert at the Music Live Exhibition at NEC in Solihull, West Midlands in 2009.

=== Reform, new music and Pass Me the Conch (2020–present) ===
In 2020, Jay Butler, Ralph Jezzard and Ritch Battersby decided to reunite after 17 years to release new music. Missing from the reunion was guitarist Chris McCormack, for reasons which the band did not disclose. Instead the band played with a new guitarist, Ben Marsden. They released their first single in 20 years, "Ruin Your Youth" on 27 November 2020. Their next single, "Another Life", was released on 2 April 2021. Both were released under the record label Technical Foul. The band revealed in the About section of their Facebook page that Jezzard had parted ways with the band for personal reasons, making the band a duo act. A new single, "Ici Mon Decree", was released on 5 November 2021. The band released their second studio album, Pass Me the Conch on 2 September 2022. In the liner notes of the album, former members Jezzard and McCormack were among those who were thanked by the band.

Grand Theft Audio then embarked on a UK tour in September along with CJ Wildheart and Scott Sorry. The following month, Grand Theft Audio collaborated with US punk singer, and former Wildheart, Scott Sorry on a cover of Mission of Burma's "That's When I Reach for My Revolver". The song, released under the port-manteau moniker of Sorry Audio, was made available via online music platform Bandcamp on 7 October 2022. Their former producer and bassist Ralph Jezzard died on 24 February 2025.

== Musical style and influences ==
Frontman Jay Butler said once in an interview when asked about the band's musical style: "In England at the moment, there's a big divide between rock bands, metal bands and electronica bands", Butler noted. "It's like you can't have a song that's catchy if you're a rock band, and you're not supposed to rock if you're an electronica band. But we don't look at music that way, so we took all the little bits that we liked and bastardized them to build the kind of band we wanted to be in. We wanted to create a band that was like all of your favourite bands at the same time. We wanted something with lots of hooks, but also with a bit of rock backbone to it, something that was so annoyingly sing along that you either had to love it or hate it. Our bottom line is: does it rock, does it sound good and does it make you want to go out and do something? We don't have any interest in being this week's flavour of the month; we don't want to be a band that's just recognized by journalists and other musicians".

== Lineup ==
Current members

- Jay Butler – vocals (1998–2003, 2009, 2020–present), guitar (2020–present)
- Ritch Battersby – drums, vocals (1998–2003, 2009, 2020–present)

Former members

- Ralph Jezzard – bass, keyboards, samples, vocals (1998–2003, 2009, 2020–2021; died 2025)
- Chris McCormack – guitar, vocals (1998–2003, 2009)

== Discography ==
- Blame Everyone (2000)
- Pass Me the Conch (2022)

== Soundtrack appearances ==
- "Stoopid Ass" on Dude, Where's My Car? and The Hole (2001)
- "We Luv U" on Dude, Where's My Car? and FIFA 2001
- "As Good As It Gets" on Gran Turismo 3: A-Spec (US)
- "Wake Up In Your Own Mind" on Gran Turismo 3: A-Spec (PAL/JP)
- "Avarice" on Gran Turismo 3: A-Spec (PAL/JP)
- "Dead Man Leaving" on Gran Turismo 3: A-Spec (PAL/JP)
