= Popstars (Eden's Crush album) =

Studio album by Eden's Crush
- Released: May 1, 2001
- Recorded: November 2000 – February 2001
- Genre: Pop
- Length: 47:57
- Labels: London-Sire Records; 143 Records
- Producer: David Foster

Singles from Popstars
- 1. "Get Over Yourself" Released: February 26, 2001; 2. "Love This Way" Released: July 31, 2001

Popstars is the debut and only studio album by American musical group Eden's Crush, released in the United States by London-Sire Records and 143 Records on May 1, 2001. "Get Over Yourself" was its first single, followed by the album and group's last single "Love This Way". The album was executive produced by David Foster.

The album debuted at number six on the US Billboard 200 selling 99,000 copies. "Get Over Yourself" had been released in March 2001 and was a top ten hit in the United States and went to number one in Canada. Popstars received only moderate promotion due to financial restraints from the group's label, which was heading towards bankruptcy. Due to this, album sales were less than anticipated. Popstars did, however, go on to sell 500,000 copies in the United States, receiving a gold certification from the Recording Industry Association of America (RIAA).

== Composition ==
Eden's Crush recorded the album from November 2000 through February 2001. The album had to be recorded quickly in order to fit into the timing of the television show Popstars. David Foster, who was the lead producer for the album, assembled the team of producers, songwriters, sound engineers and musicians to work on the album.

== Release and promotion ==
Popstars was released in the United States, Canada, United Kingdom, Australia, Japan and Brazil by London-Sire Records and 143 Records on May 1, 2001.

Several of the album's tracks including "What's Good 4 the Goose", "Get Over Yourself", "Anywhere But Here", "Love This Way", "No Drama", I Wanna Be Free", "1,000 Words (Mil Palabras)", "You Know I Can" and "Promise Me" were featured heavily during the run of the Popstars television series.

The original title of the album was to be Heaven.

The group did a promo tour in the United States during the album's first week of release, including radio interviews and televised appearances on the Late Show with David Letterman, Live With Regis and Kelly, The View and MTV's Total Request Live. Other televised appearances include local WB network morning shows and on the Spanish-language programs ¡Despierta América!, El Gordo y la Flaca and Sábado Gigante.

Unknown to the public and the group (to a certain point), the group's label was going bankrupt and did not have the financial means to promote the album past August 2001.

=== Singles ===
"Get Over Yourself" was the debut single released on February 26, 2001. The single was a hit, peaking in the United States at number eight on the Billboard Hot 100 and at number one on the Canadian Singles Chart.

"Love This Way" was the group's final single, released on July 31, 2001, to Contemporary hit radio/Pop. Due to the label's financial troubles, the song was made into a promotional single with a limited amount of CD singles released in stores in the United States only.

== Commercial performance ==
Popstars debuted at number six on the US Billboard 200 selling 99,000 copies in its first week of release. The album went on to sell 500,000 copies in the United States, receiving a gold certification from the Recording Industry Association of America (RIAA) in July 2001.

== Track listing ==
No.	Title	Writer(s)	Producer(s)	Length
1.	"What's Good 4 the Goose"	Chaka Blackmon; Ray Cham; Eric Dawkins; Stacy Ferguson; Tommie McLaughlin; Stefanie Ridel; Renee Sandstrom	ChakDaddy; Eric Dawkins; Sol Survivor; Tommie McLaughlin	3:33
2.	"Let Me Know"	Leticia Ascencio; Klaus Derendorf; Jeeve	Leticia Ascencio; Klaus Derendorf; Jeeve	3:52
3.	"Get Over Yourself"	Matthew Gerrard; John Keller; Michele Vice	Matthew Gerrard; David Foster	3:18
4.	"Anywhere But Here"	Al Kasha; David Kopatz	Riprock 'n' Alex G	3:31
5.	"Love This Way"	Franne Golde; Trina Harmon; Kasia "KC" Livingston	Gerrard; Foster	3:28
6.	"No Drama"	Kandi Burruss; Nick "Fury" Loftin	ChakDaddy; Dawk	3:52
7.	"I Wanna Be Free"	Ascencio; Eugene Batson; Derendorf; Mark Nubar; Jeeve	Ascencio; Jeeve; Derendorf	3:41
8.	"The Glamorous Life"	Prince	Gerrard	3:03
9.	"1,000 Words (Mil Palabras)"	Derendorf; Jeeve; Phillip Hunter	Jeeve; Derendorf	4:18
10.	"Two Way"	Dow Brain; Kara DioGuardi; Brad Young	Young; Dow Brain; DioGuardi	3:31
11.	"It Wasn't Me"	Nicky Holland; Andy Marvel	Jeeve; Derendorf	3:33
12.	"You Know I Can"	David Frank; Andy Goldmark; Steve Kipner	Chris Farren; Riprock 'n' Alex G	3:33
13.	"Promise Me"	Foster; Linda Thompson	Simon Franglen; Foster	4:44
Total length:				47:57

On the first pressing, track 13 was not listed. Future pressings do include the track in the track-listing. The CD was also released as an Enhanced CD in the United States and Canada. This version included behind the scenes content, photo and video galleries of the group, and links to the group's official website and the Popstars official website.

The Japanese release had 14 tracks. Track 13 was "Get Over Yourself (Main Mix)" and track 14 was "Promise Me".

David Foster co-wrote the album's 13th track "Promise Me" with his then-wife, Linda Thompson.

== Charts ==
Chart (2001)	Peak position
US Billboard 200	6

== Certifications ==
Region	Certification	Certified units/sales
United States (RIAA)	Gold	500,000^{^}
^{^} Shipments figures based on certification alone.
