= Eden's Crush =

American girl group

- Origin: Los Angeles, California, United States
- Genres: Pop; teen pop; R&B
- Years active: 2000–2002
- Label: London-Sire
- Past members: Ana Maria Lombo; Ivette Sosa Aleisho; Maile Misajon; Nicole Scherzinger; Rosanna Tavarez

Eden's Crush was an American girl group who were created on the American television series Popstars which aired on the now defunct WB. The group was formed in late 2000 and released the hit song "Get Over Yourself" in 2001, following the finale of the show. The group consisted of Ana Maria Lombo, Ivette Sosa, Maile Misajon, Nicole Scherzinger and Rosanna Tavarez.

== Career ==
Hundreds of girls competed to become pop stars in late 2000 on the TV series Popstars, produced by David Foster. The group was narrowed down to five finalists, Ivette Sosa, Maile Misajon, Ana Maria Lombo, Nicole Scherzinger and Rosanna Tavarez, over several prime time episodes. Warner Bros./Sire Records signed the group to a recording contract before the band was named or had finalized its membership, due to the hours of network television exposure the group would receive.

The group's debut single, "Get Over Yourself" topped the Canadian Singles Chart and peaked at number 8 on the Billboard Hot 100. "Love This Way" was later released as a promotional single. Their album Popstars was certified gold, and peaked at number 6 on the Billboard 200 albums chart. In 2001, the group guest starred as themselves on the season 5 episode 22 of the television show Sabrina, the Teenage Witch. In 2001, they played as a support act on some dates for *NSYNC's Pop Odyssey Tour and Jessica Simpson's DreamChaser Tour. In the beginning of 2002, their record company, London-Sire Records, folded and the group disbanded.

Scherzinger would later have more success with The Pussycat Dolls.

== Discography ==
=== Studio albums ===
List of albums, with selected chart positions
Title	Album details	Peak chart positions	Certifications
Title	Album details	US	
Popstars	Release date: May 1, 2001; Label: London-Sire; Formats: CD	6	RIAA: Gold

=== Singles ===
List of singles, with selected chart positions and certifications
Title	Year	Peak chart positions			Certifications	Album
Title	Year	US	US Pop	CAN	Certifications	Album
"Get Over Yourself"	2001	8	28	1	RIAA: Gold	Popstars
"—" denotes releases that did not chart or were not released in that territory.

=== Promotional singles ===
Title	Year	Album
"Love This Way"	2001	Popstars

== Concert tours ==
Opening act

- PopOdyssey (NSYNC) (2001)
- DreamChaser Tour (Jessica Simpson) (2001)
