= Get Over Yourself (Eden's Crush song) =

2001 single by Eden's Crush

Single by Eden's Crush

from the album Popstars
- B-side: "Solo piensas en ti"
- Released: February 26, 2001
- Genre: R&B; pop
- Length: 3:18
- Label: London-Sire
- Songwriters: Matthew Gerrard; John Keller; Michele Vice-Maslin; Connie Blue Puche
- Producer: Matthew Gerrard

Eden's Crush singles chronology
"Get Over Yourself" (2001)	"Love This Way" (2001)

"Get Over Yourself" is a song by American musical group Eden's Crush. It was released on February 26, 2001, as the first single from their debut album, Popstars (2001). The track was produced by David Foster and Matthew Gerrard. To promote the single, a music video was filmed, directed by Travis Payne and Honey (Nick Brooks and Laura Kelly).

"Get Over Yourself" holds the distinction of making Eden's Crush the first female group to top the US Billboard Hot 100 Singles Sales chart with a debut single, selling 77,000 copies during its first week. On the main Billboard Hot 100 chart, the song reached number eight, while in Canada, it peaked at number one. It was one of only three singles in 2001 to have sold over 500,000 copies in the US. In 2017, Billboard ranked the song at number 81 on their list of the "100 Greatest Girl Group Songs of All Time".

== Track listing ==
CD single
No.	Title	Length
1.	"Get Over Yourself" (album version)	3:19
2.	"Get Over Yourself" (instrumental)	3:19
3.	"Ana Maria's Message"	0:07
4.	"Ivette's Message"	0:07
5.	"Maile's Message"	0:07
6.	"Nicole's Message"	0:07
7.	"Rosanna's Message"	0:07
8.	"Solo piensas en ti" (Spanish version)	3:32
9.	"Eden's Crush Group Message" (English)	0:10
10.	"Eden's Crush Group Message" (Spanish)	0:09

Tracks 8, 9, and 10 are hidden tracks, although track 8 is only hidden on some versions. It is referenced as "Get Over Yourself (Latin Version)."

== Charts ==
=== Weekly charts ===
Weekly chart performance for "Get Over Yourself"
Chart (2001)	Peak position
Canada (Nielsen SoundScan)	1
US Billboard Hot 100	8
US Top 40 Tracks (Billboard)	31

=== Year-end charts ===
Year-end chart performance for "Get Over Yourself"
Chart (2001)	Position
Canada (Nielsen SoundScan)	27
US Billboard Hot 100	92

Chart (2002)	Position
Canada (Nielsen SoundScan)	163

== Certifications ==
Certifications and sales for "Get Over Yourself"
Region	Certification	Certified units/sales
United States (RIAA)	Gold	500,000

== Release history ==
Release dates and formats for "Get Over Yourself"
Region	Date	Format(s)	Label	Ref.
United States	February 26, 2001	CD; cassette	London-Sire	
United States	March 6, 2001	Rhythmic contemporary radio	London-Sire	
United States	March 20, 2001	Contemporary hit radio	London-Sire	
Australia	September 17, 2001	CD	Warner Music Australia	
