= London-Sire Records =

American record label

London-Sire Records, Inc.
- Industry: Music Industry
- Genre: Record label
- Predecessor: London Recordings; Sire Records Group
- Founded: August 1999
- Founder: Warner Music Group
- Defunct: January 2002
- Fate: Closed
- Successor: Sire Records
- Headquarters: United States
- Area served: North America
- Key people: Peter Koepke; Seymour Stein (co-CEOs)
- Owner: Warner Music Group
- Number of employees: 45
- Website: london-sire.com

London-Sire Records was an American-based record label owned by Warner Music Group, created in August 1999 with the merging of Warner Music Group's struggling Sire Records Group and the US division of London Recordings, which WMG had acquired from Universal Music Group following their merger with PolyGram in December 1998. Seymour Stein remained at the helm as CEO, with Peter Koepke acting as co-head. However, the binding of the two companies proved to be largely unsuccessful, and failed to produce a hit. The label was shuttered by AOL Time Warner at the end of 2001, and played a role in the dissolution of AOL Time Warner's partnership in April 2003. Sire was later relaunched by Stein as an imprint of Warner Bros. Records.

Notable acts on the label included: Eden's Crush, Scene 23, Guster, Morcheeba, Harvey Danger, Aphex Twin, Orbital, Artful Dodger, Sugababes, The Avalanches, The Tragically Hip, Downthesun and 40 Below Summer.

The label also included Essential Records (London) founded by Pete Tong in London, England, which released dance music compilations from well known DJs and artists such as Paul Oakenfold, Fatboy Slim, Carl Cox, John Digweed, Boy George, DJ Skribble, DJ Icey, and Peter Rauhofer.

== Past artists ==
This is a list of all the artists who were signed to London-Sire Records.

When London-Sire was disbanded in 2002, the label's artists were allowed to transfer to other Warner Music labels.

- 40 Below Summer (transferred to Reprise Records)
- All Saints
- Artful Dodger
- The Avalanches (transferred to Elektra Records)
- Downthesun
- Eden's Crush
- The English Beat
- Grand Theft Audio
- Guster (transferred to Reprise Records)
- Harvey Danger
- Kaci Battaglia
- Mandy Barnett
- Morcheeba (transferred to Reprise Records)
- Orbital
- Paul Oakenfold (transferred to Maverick Records)
- Pet Shop Boys
- Scene 23
- Sugababes
- The Tragically Hip

== See also ==
- List of record labels
