= N the Mix =

Video by NSYNC
- Released: November 10, 1998
- Genre: Teen pop; R&B
- Length: 80 minutes
- Label: RCA/BMG

NSYNC video chronology
N the Mix (1998)	Live from Madison Square Garden (2000)

*N the Mix (official title with subtitles: *N the Mix: The Official Home Video or *N the Mix: The Official Home DVD) is the first VHS/DVD by NSYNC. It was released on December 14, 1998, through RCA/BMG labels. The video compiles a collection of essential NSYNC content, among its highlights is a detailed account of the group's formation, tracing their origins in Orlando through to the final lineup featuring Lance Bass, JC Chasez, Joey Fatone, Chris Kirkpatrick and Justin Timberlake.

The release features alternate versions of music videos, including the U.S. and European edits of "I Want You Back", as well as hit singles like "Tearin' Up My Heart" and "(God Must Have Spent) A Little More Time on You", accompanied by behind-the-scenes insights into their production. Backstage footage, live performances—such as the pivotal Disney Channel special—and documentation of early tours provide a comprehensive look at the group's artistic evolution.

Rare material, including Germany-exclusive singles ("Here We Go" and "U Drive Me Crazy"), as well as candid moments showcasing the members' offstage personalities and hobbies, further enriches the collection. The DVD also preserves iconic performances like "Crazy for You", featuring the band's signature choreography, cementing its status as an indispensable resource for both fans and scholars of 1990s and 2000s pop music. It also includes photos, chaptering that allows viewers to watch each band member separately and a karaoke function.

== Critical reception ==
Professional ratings
Review scores
Source	Rating
AllMusic	4/5 stars

The AllMusic website rated the project four out of five stars. The site's critic, JT Griffith, gave a favorable review, noting that fans of the group would certainly appreciate the content. He emphasized that, compared to unofficial DVDs, this official release offers quality access, sharp images, and a fun experience. However, he pointed out that, since it predates the album No Strings Attached, the DVD does not include songs like "Bye Bye Bye", also recommending other works by the band, such as Making the Tour and Live at Madison Square Garden, to complement fans' collections.

== Track listing ==
*N The Mix - The Official Home Video
No.	Title	Length
1.	"Opening Interview Crazy For You"	3:39
2.	"I Want You Back (US Version)"	3:25
3.	"Members' introduction: I Just Wanna Be With You"	4:03
4.	"Tearin' Up My Heart"	3:28
5.	"N Sync Boyband RW Interview I Need Love"	3:09
6.	"Here We Go"	3:35
7.	"N Sync Interview I'm Gonna Be (500 Miles)"	9:30
8.	"For the Girl Who Has Everything"	3:45
9.	"N Sync Interview Everything I Own"	3:54
10.	"Together Again"	3:25
11.	"N Sync Uk Version Recording Studios Justin Timberlake & Jc Chasez"	6:07
12.	"U Drive Me Crazy"	3:38
13.	"N Sync Interview *N Sync The Winter Album"	5:05
14.	"Merry Christmas, Happy Holidays"	4:16
15.	"N Sync Interview Lance Bass & Chris & Joey"	4:35
16.	"(God Must Have Spent) A Little More Time on You"	4:35
17.	"N Sync Thanks The Watching I See You Next Year 2000 Bye"	1:21
18.	"Credits Outro Giddy Up"	4:20

== Personnel ==
Credits adapted from the back cover of the DVD *N the Mix: The Official DVD.

- Produced and directed by Lorin W. Finkelstein
- Edited by Allan Miller of Moving Pictures
- Executive producer: Johny Wright
- Executive director: Louis J. Pearlman
- Executive representation: Trans Continental Entertainment, Inc.
- Management rep: Doug Brown
- Creative executive producer: Doug Biro
- Executive producer: Kaja Gula

== Charts ==
Chart (1998)	Peak position
US Billboard Top Music Videos	1

== Certifications ==
Certifications and sales for N the Mix
Region	Certification	Certified units/sales
United States (RIAA)	6× Platinum	600,000^{^}
^{^} Shipments figures based on certification alone.

== Release history ==
Region	Date	Format	Catalogue no.	Label	Ref.
United States	November 10, 1998	VHS	07863 65000-3	RCA Records	
United States	August 24, 1999	DVD	07863 65001-9	RCA Records	
