= Live from Madison Square Garden (NSYNC video album) =

Video by NSYNC
- Released: November 21, 2000
- Genre: Teen pop; R&B
- Length: 90 minutes
- Label: Jive

NSYNC video chronology
N the Mix (1998)	Live from Madison Square Garden (2000)	Making the Tour (2001)

Live from Madison Square Garden is the second VHS/DVD by NSYNC. It was released on November 21, 2000, through Jive Records. It documents a performance from their No Strings Attached Tour, which supported their 2000 album and became a commercial success, grossing over $70 million. The Madison Square Garden concert featured elaborate production, including pyrotechnics and aerial stunts, and was later broadcast as an HBO special, drawing over six million viewers. The DVD/VHS includes hits like "Bye Bye Bye" and "It's Gonna Be Me" alongside comedic segments and audience interactions.

== Background ==
Live from Madison Square Garden is a concert film documenting one of the performances from NSYNC's No Strings Attached Tour, the group's third concert tour in support of their 2000 album No Strings Attached. Launched in May 2000, the tour became a commercial phenomenon, with all dates selling out on the first day of ticket sales and grossing over $70 million, making it the second-highest-grossing North American tour of the year.

The Madison Square Garden show (New York) was a highlight of the tour, featuring elaborate production elements such as pyrotechnics, stage lifts, and aerial suspension. A portion of the tickets for this concert were auctioned through Yahoo Auctions, with proceeds benefiting charities tied to the band members. While some critics dismissed the performance as "clichéd" for its teen-pop appeal, others praised the group’s vocal harmonies, particularly in ballads like "This I Promise You".

The tour was first documented on the MTV series, Making the Tour. The documentary followed the band's process from song selection, wardrobe and rehearsals. A full length performance of "Space Cowboy (Yippie-Yi-Yay)" at the Tacoma Dome was shown during the show. The episode aired on July 16, 2000. A feature length VHS and DVD followed in February 2001. The concerts at Madison Square Garden were filmed for a HBO special. The special attracted over six million viewers, becoming one of the highest rated concert specials on the network. The concert aired on July 27, 2000.

The HBO special was released as the DVD/VHS Live from Madison Square Garden and captures the tour's signature structure, including comedic interludes, performances of hits like "Bye Bye Bye" and "It's Gonna Be Me", and audience interactions—all hallmarks of the No Strings Attached Tour. It was released on VHS and DVD on November 21, 2000. The DVD featured an interactive gallery containing pictures of the band during recording sessions, rehearsals and performing on stage. The video was certified three times platinum by the RIAA on December 18, 2000. The HBO special was nominated for "Music Special of the Year" at the TV Guide Award.

== Critical reception ==
Professional ratings
Review scores
Source	Rating
AllMusic	3/5 stars
The Record	Unfavorable

The critic from The Record wrote an unfavorable review of the DVD and didn't hold back in criticizing the boy band's work. According to them, the concert is full of "painful" songs, including hits like "Bye Bye Bye", "It's Gonna Be Me", and "This I Promise You"—which were bluntly described as "crappy hits". The review's ironic tone becomes even clearer in its closing line—"But, I had to let you know — just in time for Christmas"—as if the critic were doing the public a "favor" by warning them about the DVD before anyone could make the mistake of buying it as a holiday gift.

== Track listing ==
No.	Title	Length
1.	"No Strings Attached"
2.	"I Want You Back"
3.	"(God Must Have Spent) A Little More Time on You"
4.	"Tearin' Up My Heart"
5.	"Justin's Beat Box"
6.	"It's Gonna Be Me"
7.	"I Drive Myself Crazy"
8.	"I Thought She Knew"
9.	"Just Got Paid"
10.	"Space Cowboy (Yippie Yi Yay)"
11.	"It Makes Me Ill"
12.	"This I Promise You"
13.	"Digital Get Down"
14.	"Bye Bye Bye"

== Personnel ==
Credits adapted from the back cover of the DVD Live From Madison Square Garden.

- Exclusive Management by Johnny Wright & Wright Entertainment Group
- Executive Video Supervision: Janet Moisbaum"

== Charts ==
Chart (1998)	Peak position
UK Video Charts	23
US Billboard Top Music Videos	1

== Certifications ==
Certifications and sales for Live from Madison Square Garden
Region	Certification	Certified units/sales
United States (RIAA)	4× Platinum	400,000^{^}
^{^} Shipments figures based on certification alone.

== Release history ==
Region	Date	Format	Catalogue no.	Label	Ref.
United States	October 24, 2000	VHS	01241-41739-3	Jive Records	
United States	November 21, 2000	DVD	01241-41739-9	Jive Records	
