= 1999 Kids' Choice Awards =

Children's television awards show program broadcast in 1999

- Date: May 1, 1999
- Location: Pauley Pavilion, UCLA Campus, Los Angeles
- Hosted by: Rosie O'Donnell

Highlights
- Most awards: All That (2)
- Most nominations: All That (3); Dr. Dolittle (3); Will Smith (3)

Television/radio coverage
- Network: Nickelodeon
- Runtime: 90 minutes (with commercials)
- Viewership: 5.20 million
- Produced by: Marilyn Seabury
- Directed by: Glenn Weiss

The 12th Annual Nickelodeon Kids' Choice Awards was held on May 1, 1999, at Pauley Pavilion at UCLA in Los Angeles, California. Actress Rosie O'Donnell hosted the ceremony for the fourth time. 3rd Storee, Britney Spears, TLC, and NSYNC performed live from Orlando, Florida. About 6.2 million children participated in voting.

The ceremony is also notable as leading into a sneak peek airing of "Help Wanted"/"Reef Blower"/"Tea at the Treedome", the pilot episode of SpongeBob SquarePants.

== Performers ==
| Artist(s) | Song(s) |
|---|---|
| NSYNC | "Here We Go" "I Want You Back" "Tearin' Up My Heart" |
| Britney Spears | "...Baby One More Time" |
| TLC | "No Scrubs" |

== Winners and nominees ==
Winners are listed first, in bold. Other nominees are in alphabetical order.

=== Movies ===
| Favorite Movie | Favorite Movie Actor |
|---|---|
| **The Rugrats Movie**; A Bug's Life; Dr. Dolittle; The Waterboy | **Adam Sandler** – The Wedding Singer as Robbie Hart & The Waterboy as Bobby Boucher; Jim Carrey – The Truman Show as Truman Burbank; Eddie Murphy – Dr. Dolittle as Dr. John Dolittle; Chris Tucker – Rush Hour as Detective James Carter |
Favorite Movie Actress
**Drew Barrymore** – The Wedding Singer as Julia Sullivan & Ever After as Danielle de Barbarac; Julia Roberts – Stepmom as Isabel Kelly; Meg Ryan – You've Got Mail as Kathleen "Shopgirl" Kelly; Spice Girls – Spice World as Themselves

=== Television ===
| Favorite TV Show | Favorite TV Actor |
|---|---|
| **All That**; 7th Heaven; Boy Meets World; Buffy the Vampire Slayer | **Kel Mitchell** – All That as Various Characters & Kenan & Kel as Kel Kimble; Tim Allen – Home Improvement as Timothy "Tim" Taylor; Drew Carey – The Drew Carey Show as Drew Carey; Jonathan Taylor Thomas – Home Improvement as Randy Taylor |
| Favorite TV Actress | Favorite Cartoon |
| **Mary-Kate & Ashley Olsen** – Two of a Kind as Mary-Kate & Ashley Burke; Jennifer Aniston – Friends as Rachel Green; Sarah Michelle Gellar – Buffy the Vampire Slayer as Buffy Summers; Melissa Joan Hart – Sabrina the Teenage Witch as Sabrina Spellman | **Rugrats**; CatDog; Men in Black: The Series; The Simpsons |

=== Music ===
| Favorite Singer | Favorite Music Group |
|---|---|
| **Will Smith**; Aaliyah; Brandy; Usher | ***NSYNC**; Backstreet Boys; Dru Hill; Spice Girls |
Favorite Song
**"Everybody (Backstreet's Back)"** – Backstreet Boys; "Are You That Somebody?" – Aaliyah; "Gettin' Jiggy wit It" – Will Smith; "Miami" – Will Smith

=== Sports ===
| Favorite Male Athlete | Favorite Female Athlete |
|---|---|
| **Michael Jordan**; Mark McGwire; Shaquille O'Neal; Tiger Woods | **Tara Lipinski**; Cynthia Cooper; Dominique Moceanu; Kristi Yamaguchi |
Favorite Sports Team
**Chicago Bulls**; Dallas Cowboys; Denver Broncos; New York Yankees

=== Miscellaneous ===
| Favorite Video Game | Favorite Animal Star |
|---|---|
| **Super Mario 64**; Crash Bandicoot; The Legend of Zelda: Ocarina of Time; Yoshi's Story | **Salem** – Sabrina the Teenage Witch; Babe – Babe: Pig in the City; Buddy – Air Bud: Golden Receiver; Wishbone – Wishbone |
| Favorite Book | Favorite Rising Star |
| **Chicken Soup for the Kid's Soul**; The Discovery; Godzilla; Titanic Crossing | **Kyla Pratt** – Dr. Dolittle as Maya Dolittle; Leon Frierson – All That as Himself; Natalie Imbruglia – Left of the Middle; Kerry Wood – Chicago Cubs |

== Hall of Fame ==
- Jonathan Taylor Thomas
