= No Strings Attached Tour =

2000 concert tour by NSYNC

- Tour by NSYNC
- Associated album: No Strings Attached
- Start date: May 9, 2000
- End date: January 18, 2001
- Legs: 2
- No. of shows: 86
- Box office: $76.4 million ($142.83 million in 2025 dollars)

NSYNC concert chronology
- NSYNC in Concert (1998–2000); No Strings Attached Tour (2000); PopOdyssey (2001)

The No Strings Attached Tour was the third concert tour by American boy band, NSYNC. Primarily visiting North America, the tour supported the band's third album No Strings Attached. Beginning in May 2000, the tour sold out all dates within the first day of the ticket sale. Additional dates, also in North America, were added for the Fall of 2000. When the tour ended in December 2000, it became the second highest-grossing tour in North America, earning more than $70 million.

== Background ==
The tour was initially mentioned during an AOL group chat in late 1999, when band member JC Chasez revealed the group was already planning for their next tour. It was officially announced on March 21, 2000, the same day as their album was released, with rehearsals starting soon after. The tour outing was sponsored by MCY Music and Nabisco. It was also produced by SFX Touring. The tour became an instant success, with all 50 initial dates being sold out, selling one million tickets within the first day. This was followed with the album selling over two million copies within the first week. Several tickets for the concert at Madison Square Garden and the Staples Center were auctioned off through Yahoo! Auctions. Proceeds went to the "Justin Timberlake Foundation" and the "Challenge for the Children Foundation".

Rehearsals began in April 2000 at the Lakeland Center in Lakeland, Florida. Due to the closeness of their previous tour, the stage for this outing was very similar. However, the stage included new elements including pyrotechnics, stage lifts and aerial suspension. These elements were the reason why the band opted to perform in stadiums and arenas instead of outdoor amphitheatres. Describing the stage, Lance Bass stated, "It's amazing with the pyro and different things. I can't really reveal a lot of the gags that we are going to do, but it's going to be very entertaining and we are going to get very close to everybody in the audience". Due to the limited number of dates performed, the stadium dates were centralized regionally, in order to give each fan a chance to see them.

During an appearance on TRL, the band announced Destiny's Child would join them on tour, however the R&B group backed out and joined Christina Aguilera on her debut tour. Later in the tour, Sisqó dropped out of the tour to film his role in the film Get Over It. RnB and pop singer Pink also joined the tour for several dates, including some with Sisqó. When the tour kicked off, Justin Timberlake received his high school diploma onstage at the Pyramid Arena. Another honor was received when the band were given the key to the city by Orlando mayor Glenda Hood. The band also opened a Ronald McDonald House, where a room was named in their honor.

The success of the tour prompted the band to add an additional leg of dates in the United States. In response to the additional dates, Joey Fatone stated,

"We’re real excited about that. But I think we’re just going to do a great show again. You know, a lot of people have seen some of the show. But you know, every show that we do is different. We add little things here and there to change it up and make it an original show, so hopefully everybody will enjoy it."

The band had earlier announced they would join Britney Spears on a co-headlining tour of Europe in October. However, a co-headlining tour did not materialize and Spears toured the region solo. As the second North American leg came to a close, the band announced they would star in their first feature concert film. The film was released exclusively through IMAX theaters for six months. Additionally, the band partnered with MSN to give fans exclusive access to newsletters, photos and video footage. Known as "NSYNC@MSN", the service provided web and email access along with MSN Messenger and Windows Media Player.

=== Concert synopsis ===
The show begins with *NSYNC as marionettes dropping 40 feet above the stage with a small sample of “I’ve Got No Strings.” When they land, the group cuts the strings and unhooks themselves before heading into two dance-oriented performances of “No Strings Attached” and “I Want You Back”. This is followed by Lance Bass welcoming the crowd before slowing things down with a performance of “(God Must Have Spent) A Little More Time on You”, in which the group rises 30 feet above the stage on 5 small platforms.

After the group leaves the stage, a video interlude hosted by television persona Ananda Lewis called Total *NSYNC Live plays (parodying the show Total Request Live), announcing fans are given 4 selections of possible songs that *NSYNC would sing next. The first 3-song choices (“Yankee Doodle Dandy”, “Three Blind Mice”, and “Twinkle Twinkle Little Star”) end up with jeers and laughs from the crowd. By the time Lewis says the fourth option “Tearin' Up My Heart”, the crowd goes wild, it gets selected as the chosen song, and the group returns to the stage dressed in freestyle clothing (almost like their previous wardrobe from their last tour) to perform the song.

The show continues with Justin Timberlake returning to the stage showcasing some of his freestyle Beatbox skills before the group's drummer begins to upstage him and calls him out. Timberlake challenges the drummer to a battle which ends in victory for Timberlake. The rest of the group returns to the stage in urban attire to perform “It's Gonna Be Me”. This is followed by the group putting together a living room setting to slow things down again with two ballads, “I Drive Myself Crazy” and “I Thought She Knew”.

After the group leaves the stage again, another interlude is shown featuring the group heading into their quick-change room featuring circus people, an arcade, and a movie theatre (which includes the group watching Lance Bass in the finals of Who Wants to Be a Millionaire where he fictionally wins $1 million). They then return to the stage dressed in club attire all designed with money on it for a performance of "Just Got Paid". During the song, fans selected before the show go up on stage and dance with the group with confetti dropping everywhere. They also introduce their band members before all leave the stage again.

The show continues with a futuristic interlude which includes a laser light show and the face of the virtual No Strings Attached clown mascot (with a robot voice) giving the audience riddles. NSYNC then rises out of the floor dressed in midwestern futuristic attire for a performance of “Space Cowboy” featuring an extended dance break. At the end of the song, the group goes back down into the ground with the band playing an extended instrumental interlude of the chorus. It ends abruptly with the sound of a car crashing, a woman screaming, a man yelling "Someone's hurt", and the sound of an ambulance siren. NSYNC returns to the stage in a brief hospital skit dressed in medical coats taking care of an injured Timberlake before heading into “It Makes Me Ill”. This is followed by the group bringing out stools to slow things down for another song. However, Chasez says he wants to get closer to the crowd. The stage piece (on a track) elevates and brings the members out to the center of the arena, and the guys sing “This I Promise You” as they get close to the crowds. After the song, the stage piece goes back to where it was, the group takes their bows and leaves the stage.

The show continues with a large video screen that says "*NSYNC" and the band, dressed in futuristic outfits, perform “Digital Get Down”. The show concludes the encore set with “Bye Bye Bye”. The guys walk over the main stage and give thanks, once again introducing their musicians. The group then disappears through a geyser as fireworks go off at the same time.

=== Legal and safety occurrences ===
Despite the success of the tour, it faced a few bumps in the road. The bands were targets for assassination by a male teenager. His mother discovered a notebook that contained a detailed plan to kill all five members of the band during their show in Atlanta. The plan (called "Operation Deathstrike") featured the teen robbing a local gun store to obtain the weapons and money to carry out his plan. She informed the local authorities and her son was detained at the Sumner County Juvenile Detention Center. He was later admitted to a psychiatric hospital, although the authorities felt he lacked any true intentions to executing his plan. Extra security precautions were taken during both of the Georgia shows.

Before performing in Joliet, Illinois, the stage was destroyed by a tornado at the Route 66 Raceway. The date was rescheduled for August. For the rescheduled show, many parents attempted to sue the band and SFX Touring for being unable to attend the show due to traffic. An hour before their show in Greensboro, North Carolina, a bomb threat was phoned in. Although the band members were evacuated, audiences were not informed of the threat. Coliseum officials claimed they did not want to cause panic among the estimated crowds of 15,000 people by informing them of the bomb threat. After the authorities determined there was no threat, the concert resumed an hour after its original start time. In November 2000, the band and their manager were sued by Sid & Marty Krofft Pictures, Inc. (the team behind H.R. Pufnstuf, Land of the Lost and The Bugaloos). The lawsuit cited copyright infringement and breach of contract with the company. The company was hired to build life-sized puppets that mimicked the likeness of the band members. The puppets were to be utilized for their performance of "Bye Bye Bye" on the tour and at the American Music Awards. The duo were told they would receive a cut of the merchandise profits related to the use of the puppets. When asked for payment, they were informed by Johnny Wright that they were not entitled to any funds. The lawsuit was dismissed in November 2000.

The band faced yet another lawsuit, in December 2000, filed by a Missouri teenaged girl, alleging that she was ‘verbally assaulted’ by Justin Timberlake outside one of their shows. While waiting to see the band, after their concert at the Chase Park Plaza in Central West End, St. Louis, the teenager states that she was "snubbed" by Timberlake, who dismissively refused to give her an autograph. She yelled, "I think JC is better anyway! He's cuter!" The girl says that this comment was not taken lightly, with Timberlake (allegedly) shoving her into a wall and shouting profanities at her. A reporter for KSDK claimed to be a witness to the incident. The girl would end up dropping the suit before it could reach court.

== Opening acts ==
- Pink (North America—Leg 1)
- Sisqó (North America—Leg 1, select dates)
- Boyz N Girlz United (Denver)
- Innosense (Pittsburgh, Joliet, Foxborough)
- Ron Irizarry (Austin, Joliet)
- Lil' Bow Wow (North America—Leg 2, select dates)
- Meredith Edwards (North America—Leg 2, select dates)
- Baha Men (Las Vegas)
- Dream (Los Angeles—November 2000)
- soulDecision (North America—Leg 2, select dates)
- The Sugarhill Gang (Greesboro, East Rutherford)
- i5 (East Rutherfold—November 2000)

== Personnel ==
=== NSYNC ===
- JC Chasez – Lead Tenor Vocals
- Justin Timberlake – Lead Tenor Vocals
- Chris Kirkpatrick – Backing Countertenor Vocals
- Lance Bass – Backing Bass Vocals
- Joey Fatone – Backing Baritone Vocals

=== Band ===
Throughout their concerts, the five were accompanied by the following instrumentalists on this tour:

- Kevin Antunes – Music Director, Keyboards
- Troy Antunes – Bass
- Billy Ashbaugh – Drums, Percussion
- Ruben Ruiz – Guitar, Keyboards
- David Cook – Keyboards
- Paul Howards – Saxophone, Percussion, Keyboards

== Set list ==
1. "Intro" (contains excerpts from "I've Got No Strings" along with elements of "Digital Get Down" and "I'll Never Stop") (dance introduction)
2. "No Strings Attached" (contains elements of "Prologue" from West Side Story)
3. "I Want You Back"
4. "(God Must Have Spent) A Little More Time on You"
5. "TNL: Total NSYNC Live" (featuring Ananda Lewis) (video interlude)
6. "Tearin' Up My Heart"
7. "Justin's Beat Box" (contains elements of "It Ain't My Fault") (performance interlude)
8. "It's Gonna Be Me"
9. "Thinking of You (I Drive Myself Crazy)"
10. "I Thought She Knew"
11. "NTV: 'NSYNC TV" (contains elements of "Frolic" and "It's Gonna Be Me") (video interlude)
12. "Just Got Paid"
13. "Space Circus Clown" (video interlude)
14. "Space Cowboy (Yippie-Yi-Yay)"
15. "It Makes Me Ill" (contains elements of "Sir Nose D'Voidoffunk)
16. "This I Promise You"

Encore

17. "Video Interlude"
18. "Digital Get Down"
19. "Bye Bye Bye"
20. "Outro" (contains elements of "Tom Sawyer")

Notes

- For the concert in Jacksonville, the band performed:
  - "No Strings Attached"
  - "It's Gonna Be Me"
  - A medley of "I Want You Back" and "Tearin' Up My Heart"
  - "This I Promise You"
  - "Digital Get Down"
  - "Bye Bye Bye"

== Tour dates ==
Date	City	Country	Venue	Opening Acts
North America—Leg 1
May 9, 2000	Biloxi	United States	Mississippi Coast Coliseum	Pink; Sisqó
May 10, 2000	North Little Rock	United States	Alltel Arena	Pink; Sisqó
May 12, 2000	Memphis	United States	Pyramid Arena	Pink; Sisqó
May 13, 2000^{[A]}	Los Angeles	United States	Dodger Stadium	—N/a
May 14, 2000	Nashville	United States	Adelphia Coliseum	Pink; Sisqó
May 18, 2000	Atlanta	United States	Philips Arena	Pink; Sisqó
May 19, 2000	Atlanta	United States	Philips Arena	Pink; Sisqó
May 21, 2000	Orlando	United States	TD Waterhouse Centre	Pink; Sisqó
May 22, 2000	Sunrise	United States	National Car Rental Center	Pink; Sisqó
May 23, 2000	Sunrise	United States	National Car Rental Center	Pink; Sisqó
May 24, 2000	Tampa	United States	Ice Palace	Pink; Sisqó
May 25, 2000	Tampa	United States	Ice Palace	Pink; Sisqó
May 27, 2000	New Orleans	United States	Louisiana Superdome	Pink; Sisqó
May 29, 2000	Austin	United States	Frank Erwin Center	Pink; Sisqó
May 30, 2000	Houston	United States	Compaq Center	Pink; Sisqó
May 31, 2000	Houston	United States	Compaq Center	Pink; Sisqó
June 1, 2000	San Antonio	United States	Alamodome	Pink; Sisqó
June 2, 2000	Dallas	United States	Reunion Arena	Pink; Sisqó
June 5, 2000	Phoenix	United States	America West Arena	Pink; Sisqó
June 6, 2000	Phoenix	United States	America West Arena	Pink; Sisqó
June 7, 2000	San Diego	United States	San Diego Sports Arena	Pink; Sisqó
June 9, 2000	Pasadena	United States	Rose Bowl	Sisqó; Pink; Ron Izzary
June 11, 2000	Oakland	United States	Network Associates Coliseum	Pink; Sisqó
June 13, 2000	Tacoma	United States	Tacoma Dome	Pink; Sisqó
June 14, 2000	Vancouver	Canada	General Motors Place	Pink; Sisqó
June 15, 2000	Portland	United States	Rose Garden	Pink; Sisqó
June 17, 2000	Salt Lake City	United States	Rice–Eccles Stadium	Pink; Sisqó
June 20, 2000	Denver	United States	Mile High Stadium	Pink; Sisqó
June 22, 2000	Kansas City	United States	Kemper Arena	Pink; Sisqó
June 23, 2000	Minneapolis	United States	Target Center	Pink; Sisqó
June 26, 2000	Lexington	United States	Rupp Arena	Pink; Sisqó
June 27, 2000	Columbus	United States	Value City Arena	Pink; Sisqó
June 28, 2000	St. Louis	United States	Kiel Center	Pink; Sisqó
June 30, 2000	Cleveland	United States	Gund Arena	Pink; Sisqó
July 1, 2000	Cleveland	United States	Gund Arena	Pink; Sisqó
July 2, 2000	Buffalo	United States	HSBC Arena	Pink; Sisqó
July 4, 2000	Greensboro	United States	Greensboro Coliseum	Pink; Sisqó
July 5, 2000	Raleigh	United States	Raleigh Entertainment & Sports Arena	Pink; Sisqó
July 10, 2000	Washington, D.C.	United States	RFK Stadium	Pink; Sisqó
July 11, 2000	Albany	United States	Pepsi Arena	Pink; Sisqó
July 12, 2000	Albany	United States	Pepsi Arena	Pink; Sisqó
July 14, 2000	Cincinnati	United States	Cinergy Field	Pink; Sisqó
July 16, 2000	Pittsburgh	United States	Three Rivers Stadium	Pink; Sisqó
July 18, 2000	Pontiac	United States	Pontiac Silverdome	Pink; Sisqó
July 20, 2000^{[B]}	Philadelphia	United States	First Union Spectrum	—N/a
July 21, 2000	Philadelphia	United States	First Union Spectrum	Pink; Sisqó
July 23, 2000	Foxborough	United States	Foxboro Stadium	Pink; Sisqó
July 25, 2000	New York City	United States	Madison Square Garden	Pink; Sisqó
July 26, 2000	New York City	United States	Madison Square Garden	Pink; Sisqó
July 27, 2000	New York City	United States	Madison Square Garden	Pink; Sisqó
July 28, 2000	New York City	United States	Madison Square Garden	Pink; Sisqó
July 30, 2000	Hershey	United States	Hersheypark Stadium	Pink; Sisqó
July 31, 2000^{[C]}	Cincinnati	United States	Riverbend Music Center	—N/a
August 1, 2000	Joliet	United States	Route 66 Raceway	Pink; Sisqó
August 13, 2000^{[D]}	Jacksonville	United States	Jacksonville Coliseum	—N/a
North America—Leg 2
October 17, 2000	Charlotte	United States	Charlotte Coliseum	Meredith Edwards
October 18, 2000	North Charleston	United States	North Charleston Coliseum	Meredith Edwards
October 20, 2000	Greenville	United States	BI-LO Center	Meredith Edwards
October 21, 2000	Atlanta	United States	Philips Arena	Meredith Edwards
October 22, 2000	Birmingham	United States	BJCC Arena	Meredith Edwards
October 23, 2000	Birmingham	United States	BJCC Arena	Meredith Edwards
October 25, 2000	Indianapolis	United States	Conseco Fieldhouse	Meredith Edwards
October 26, 2000	Indianapolis	United States	Conseco Fieldhouse	Meredith Edwards
October 27, 2000	Knoxville	United States	Thompson–Boling Arena	soulDecision
October 30, 2000	Sunrise	United States	National Car Rental Center	Meredith Edwards
October 31, 2000	Sunrise	United States	National Car Rental Center	Meredith Edwards
November 1, 2000	Orlando	United States	TD Waterhouse Centre	Meredith Edwards
November 5, 2000	University Park	United States	Bryce Jordan Center	Meredith Edwards
November 6, 2000	East Rutherford	United States	Continental Airlines Arena	soulDecision; The Sugarhill Gang i5
November 7, 2000	East Rutherford	United States	Continental Airlines Arena	soulDecision; The Sugarhill Gang i5
November 9, 2000	Uniondale	United States	Nassau Veterans Memorial Coliseum	Meredith Edwards
November 10, 2000	Uniondale	United States	Nassau Veterans Memorial Coliseum	Meredith Edwards
November 11, 2000	Washington, D.C.	United States	MCI Center	Meredith Edwards
November 12, 2000	Philadelphia	United States	First Union Center	Meredith Edwards
November 14, 2000	Ottawa	Canada	Corel Centre	soulDecision
November 16, 2000	Toronto	Canada	SkyDome	soulDecision
November 18, 2000	Milwaukee	United States	Bradley Center	soulDecision
November 19, 2000	St. Louis	United States	Savvis Center	soulDecision
November 24, 2000	Las Vegas	United States	MGM Grand Garden Arena	Lil' Bow Wow
November 25, 2000	Las Vegas	United States	MGM Grand Garden Arena	Lil' Bow Wow
November 26, 2000	Anaheim	United States	Arrowhead Pond of Anaheim	Lil' Bow Wow
November 27, 2000	Inglewood	United States	Great Western Forum	Lil' Bow Wow
November 28, 2000	Inglewood	United States	Great Western Forum	Lil' Bow Wow
December 1, 2000	San Diego	United States	San Diego Sports Arena	Lil' Bow Wow
December 2, 2000	San Diego	United States	San Diego Sports Arena	Lil' Bow Wow
South America
January 18, 2001^{[E]}	Rio de Janeiro	Brazil	City of Rock	—N/a

Music festivals and other miscellaneous performances
^{A} This concert was a part of "Wango Tango"
^{B} This concert was a part of "McDonald's Summer Music Event"
^{C} This concert was a part of the "Riverfest"
^{D} This concert was a part of "Summer Music Mania"
^{E} This concert was a part of "Rock in Rio"

Cancellations and rescheduled shows

May 11, 2000	Lexington, Kentucky	Rupp Arena	Rescheduled to June 26, 2000
May 16, 2000	Greensboro, North Carolina	Greensboro Coliseum	Rescheduled to July 4, 2000
May 17, 2000	Raleigh, North Carolina	Raleigh Entertainment & Sports Arena	Rescheduled to July 5, 2000
June 25, 2000	Joliet, Illinois	Route 66 Raceway	Rescheduled to August 1, 2000

=== Box office score data ===
Venue	City	Tickets sold / available	Gross revenue
Alltel Arena	North Little Rock	15,831 / 15,831 (100%)	$704,272
Philips Arena	Atlanta	27,018 / 27,018 (100%)	$1,272,461
TD Waterhouse Centre	Orlando	12,932 / 12,932 (100%)	$593,479
National Car Rental Center	Sunrise	57,675 / 57,675 (100%)	$2,622,078
Ice Palace	Tampa	30,332 / 30,332 (100%)	$1,404,387
Mercedes-Benz Superdome	New Orleans	32,516 / 32,516 (100%)	$1,456,245
Frank Erwin Center	Austin	11,585 / 11,585 (100%)	$574,926
Compaq Center	Houston	23,808 / 24,626 (97%)	$1,140,005
Alamodome	San Antonio	25,890 / 27,315 (95%)	$1,151,541
America West Arena	Phoenix	24,329 / 24,329 (100%)	$1,187,943
Tacoma Dome	Tacoma	21,336 / 21,336 (100%)	$976,765
Mile High Stadium	Denver	44,166 / 57,140 (77%)	$2,125,059
Savvis Center	St. Louis	15,822 / 15,822 (100%)	$760,852
Gund Arena	Cleveland	32,915 / 36,468 (90%)	$1,582,541
Pepsi Arena	Albany	26,170 / 26,170 (100%)	$1,205,238
Cinergy Field	Cincinnati	48,234 / 48,234 (100%)	$2,091,097
Three Rivers Stadium	Pittsburgh	39,785 / 43,038 (92%)	$1,924,319
Pontiac Silverdome	Pontiac	48,708 / 48,708 (100%)	$2,395,413
Foxboro Stadium	Foxborough	97,433 / 97,433 (100%)	$4,433,201
Route 66 Raceway	Joliet	47,326 / 47,326 (100%)	$2,179,102
Charlotte Coliseum	Charlotte	17,486 / 17,486 (100%)	$787,128
Continental Airlines Arena	East Rutherford	34,008 / 34,008 (100%)	$1,566,556
First Union Center	Philadelphia	16,581 / 16,581 (100%)	$765,589
MGM Grand Garden Arena	Las Vegas	24,950 / 24,950 (100%)	$1,857,416
Total		776,836 / 798,859 (97%)	$36,757,613

== Broadcasts and recordings ==
The tour was first documented on the MTV series, Making the Tour. The documentary followed the band's process from song selection, wardrobe and rehearsals. A full length performance of "Space Cowboy (Yippie-Yi-Yay)" at the Tacoma Dome was shown during the show. The episode aired on July 16, 2000. A feature length VHS and DVD followed in February 2001. The expanded edition contained more planning and backstage footage, performances of "Bye Bye Bye" and "This I Promise You", along with the music videos from their current album. The video was certified platinum by the RIAA on March 9, 2001. The concerts at Madison Square Garden were filmed for a HBO special. The special attracted over six million viewers, becoming one of the highest rated concert specials on the network. The concert aired on July 27, 2000. The concerts were released on VHS and DVD on November 21, 2000. The DVD featured an interactive gallery containing pictures of the band during recording sessions, rehearsals and performing on stage. The video was certified three times platinum by the RIAA on December 18, 2000. The HBO special was nominated for "Music Special of the Year" at the TV Guide Award.

In August 2000, Iwerks Entertainment announced they were in talks with the band to release a full length concert film in 2001. The film, entitled "*NSYNC: Bigger Than Live", was released exclusively to IMAX theaters in select cities in the United States and the United Kingdom. Filmed at the Pontiac Silverdome in Pontiac, Michigan, the 90 minute concert was edited down to 47 minutes, removing all of the interludes and performances of "I Drive Myself Crazy", "Just Got Paid and "It Makes Me Ill". The film opened on February 23, 2001. The film remained in theaters for ten months and grossed over one million dollars. In September, the band's performance at the "Summer Music Mania" aired on Fox on September 15, 2001. The performances of "No Strings Attached", "Digital Get Down" and the medley were edited out.

== Critical response ==
The tour received positive to mixed reviews from music critics and fans who praised the band’s energy, vocal talents, and onstage persona. Scott Mervis of the Pittsburgh Post-Gazette wrote, “[NSYNC] were no boy bland. Far from it. They bounded around the stage like five Ricky Martins, and stayed choreographically in sync even at 60 yards apart…But the soul is in the voices—and 'N Sync's got 'em…If you weren't convinced they could sing, the a capella doo-wop of ‘I Thought She Knew’ led by hometown boy Chris Kirkpatrick was final proof”. Many reviews expressed the sentiment that with this tour, NSYNC effectively established themselves as outside of the shadow of rival boy band the Backstreet Boys. Billboard noted,

"from the opening notes it was apparent that the teen-pop quintet was aptly seasoned from its warm-up arena dates, as well as from virtually nonstop touring from the past two years. The group’s sizable vocal chops were very much in place, and the choreography was extended and elaborate. Justin Timberlake appeared to take a more prominent role than on previous tours, but group members Joey Fatone Jr., Lance Bass, Chris Kirkpatrick, and JC Chasez all had a chance to shine individually and as part of the group."

Writing for the Orlando Sentinel, Jim Abbott said the band "made the crowd feel at home" during the concert at the TD Waterhouse Centre. He continued, "But the power of this concert was in its impeccable production. It was an assault on the senses from the moment the five singers were lowered to the stage as human marionettes for the opening ‘No Strings Attached’”.

Some critics felt the theatrics of the concert took away from the artistry of the band and felt gimmicky. Some critical reviews, similar to reviews of NSYNC’s previous tour, questioned the band’s cachet because of their classification as bubblegum pop and the band having an audience mostly of tweens and teenage girls. “'N Sync is about theater and idolatry and the soap opera of a homeroom crush. The little girls, it seems, understand,” wrote David Segal (The Washington Post).

Jim Farber (New York Daily News) felt the shows at Madison Square Garden were "cliché and contrived". He explains, "In fact, Tuesday's show proved there certainly are strings attached, though the tugging on NSYNC's post-adolescent limbs is coming not from unseen handlers but from a more insidious force. Namely: the guys' own need to please. That they have an overwhelming desire to placate their youngest fans seemed obvious, since the show conformed to the most worn clichés of current teen-pop". However, Farber praised the group’s vocals and charm, saying, “Their five-part harmonies really sparkle in the ballads…And their ace a cappella work on ‘I Thought She Knew’ puts them in the tradition of pop's most pleasing harmonizers, from the barbershop quartets through the doo-woppers”.

== See also ==
- List of fastest-selling concert tours
