= The Winter Album (NSYNC album) =

1998 NSYNC album

Compilation album by NSYNC
- Released: November 16, 1998
- Recorded: 1997–1998
- Genre: Christmas
- Length: 46:57
- Label: Trans Continental, BMG
- Producer: Bülent Aris; Gary Carolla; Toni Cottura; Full Force; Veit Renn; Carl Sturken and Evan Rogers; Rookee; Johnny Wright (exec.)

NSYNC chronology
Home for Christmas (1998)	The Winter Album (1998)	No Strings Attached (2000)

Singles from The Winter Album
- 1. "U Drive Me Crazy" Released: September 27, 1998; 2. "Merry Christmas, Happy Holidays" Released: November 24, 1998; 3. "Thinking of You (I Drive Myself Crazy)" Released: April 1, 1999

The Winter Album is the first compilation album by American boy band NSYNC. It was released in Germany on November 16, 1998.

== Background ==
Following the release of the group's debut album, *NSYNC, in Germany in March 1997, NSYNC had mostly focused their attention on the British and American markets, releasing updated versions of the album in both territories in summer 1998, and preparing to release a seasonal album, Home for Christmas, in America for Christmas 1998. No material had been released in Germany since "Together Again", which was released on November 3, 1997. None of the tracks recorded for the British or American versions of their debut album had been released there, nor was any of the material recorded for Home for Christmas planned for release in Germany. So, the band decided that it was only fair that this material would be released there, as it was their support that kick-started their career and landed them a record deal with RCA Records. They took the five tracks recorded exclusively for the British and American editions of their debut album, and seven tracks from Home for Christmas, and packaged them together with a short interlude, "Family Affair", to create The Winter Album, made exclusively for release in Germany. The album was preceded by the lead single, "U Drive Me Crazy", which was released on September 29, 1998. The album was then released on November 17, and two weeks later, a second single, "Merry Christmas, Happy Holidays", was released to promote the album. The third and final single, "Thinking of You (I Drive Myself Crazy)", was released on February 22, 1999.

== Track listing ==
Most of the lead vocals are provided by Justin Timberlake and JC Chasez.

- "Everything I Own" has lead vocals provided by Chris Kirkpatrick, Joey Fatone, and Lance Bass.

No.	Title	Writer(s)	Producer(s)	Length
1.	"U Drive Me Crazy" (Radio Edit)	Bülent Aris, Toni Cottura, Rookee, Jan van der Toorn, G.J.O.R. Rollocks	Aris, Cottura, Rookee	3:34
2.	"(God Must Have Spent) A Little More Time on You"	Carl Sturken, Evan Rogers	Sturken, Rogers	3:58
3.	"I Drive Myself Crazy"	Rick Nowels, Allan Rich, Ellen Shipley	Veit Renn	4:00
4.	"Everything I Own"	David Gates	Full Force	3:59
5.	"I Just Wanna Be with You"	Full Force	Full Force	4:03
6.	"Kiss Me at Midnight"	Renn, Kenny Lamb	Renn	3:28
7.	"Merry Christmas, Happy Holidays"	Veit Renn, Vincent Degiorgio, Joshua S. Chasez, Justin Timberlake	Renn	4:12
8.	"All I Want Is You This Christmas"	Martin Briley, Dana Calitri	Renn	3:43
9.	"Under My Tree"	Shelley Peiken, Guy Roche	Renn	4:32
10.	"Love's in Our Hearts (On Christmas Day)"	Gary Hasse, James Lowell, Jonathan Werking	Renn	3:54
11.	"In Love on Christmas"	Rory Bennett, K-Ci Hailey, Jo Jo Hailey	Renn	4:06
12.	"The First Noel"	Traditional	Gary Carolla	3:28

== Charts ==
Chart (1998)	Position
German Albums (Offizielle Top 100)	31
