= Live from Madison Square Garden =

Live from Madison Square Garden may refer to:

- Live from Madison Square Garden (NSYNC video album), 2000
- Live from Madison Square Garden (O.A.R. album), 2007
- Live from Madison Square Garden (Eric Clapton and Steve Winwood album), 2009
- WWE Live from Madison Square Garden, a 2015 professional wrestling event

== See also ==
- Live at Madison Square Garden (disambiguation)
- Madison Square Garden, eponymous venue
