= You Drive Me Crazy (disambiguation) =

"You Drive Me Crazy" is a 1981 single by Shakin' Stevens.

You Drive Me Crazy may also refer to:

- "(You Drive Me) Crazy", a 1999 song by Britney Spears
- "You Drive Me Crazy (T-ara song)", a 2010 song by T-ara
- "U Drive Me Crazy", a 1998 song by NSYNC
- You Drive Me Crazy (TV series), a South Korean television drama

== See also ==
- She Drives Me Crazy
