= Live at Madison Square Garden =

Live at Madison Square Garden may refer to:

- Live at Madison Square Garden (Bon Jovi album), released in 2009
- Live at Madison Square Garden (Shawn Mendes album), released in 2016
- Live at Madison Square Garden 1978, by Jethro Tull
- Aziz Ansari: Live at Madison Square Garden, released in 2015
- Phish: New Year's Eve 1995 – Live at Madison Square Garden, released in 2005
- Live at Madison Square Garden, a video album by Vulfpeck released in 2019

== See also ==
- Live from Madison Square Garden (disambiguation)
- Madison Square Garden, eponymous venue
