= Disney Channel in Concert =

- Country of origin: United States
- Original language: English

Production
- Camera setup: Videotape; multi-camera
- Running time: 60 minutes (approx.)

Original release
- Network: Disney Channel
- Release: June 22, 1997 – January 2001

Disney Channel in Concert is a reality series that combined footage of live concerts with a behind-the-scenes look at the artists' personal lives. The artists came from all genres of music, including hip-hop, country and pop to classical and blues. Episodes often promoted the artist's sales and popularity to a teen and pre-teen audience. The series ran from early 1997 to late 2001.

== Background ==
Each show featured a specially taped live concert, with documentary footage playing between songs showing the artist pursuing personal and professional passions, and interviews with mentors, friends and family. Though specials were usually taped at Disney parks or properties like Disney's Hollywood Studios or aboard the Disney cruise ship Disney Magic, the Backstreet Boys concert was filmed at the New Amsterdam Theatre in New York City and the 98 Degrees and Hoku episode was filmed in the artists' respective hometowns of Cincinnati and Honolulu. The concert specials typically lasted an hour and aired on Fridays, with reruns being shown after it aired on the network frequently. The promotional content for these concerts were hosted in a program called "Behind the Ears" hosted by RuDee Sade Lipscomb.

The episode with NSYNC notably launched the group's career in the U.S.; they were mostly known by European audiences before the concert special. A month prior to the airing of the concert, the group's debut album sat at number 82 on the Billboard 200 chart. The concert was replayed on the Disney Channel multiple times, leading album sales to skyrocket. Three weeks after the concert first aired, the album reached the number 9 spot.

== Cancellation ==
Disney Channel took In Concert off the air in late 2001, as well as with music videos, citing the inability to receive a stake in revenue from the artists' CD sales and lack of exclusivity for the videos However, they still aired music videos from songs featured in Disney's feature films and from artists played on Radio Disney and signed to Disney's in-house record companies Hollywood Records and Walt Disney Records.

== List of concert specials ==
- LeAnn Rimes in Concert (1997)
- Disney's Young Musicians Symphony Orchestra in Concert (1992-1997) (Mickey Mouse)
- Ray J in Concert with Brandy (1997)
- Jonny Lang in Concert (1997)
- NSYNC in Concert (1998)
- Cleopatra in Concert (1998)
- Holidays in Concert (1998) (NSYNC, Shawn Colvin, and Tatyana Ali)
- B*Witched and Five in Concert (1999)
- Backstreet Boys in Concert (1999)
- Britney Spears and Joey McIntyre in Concert (1999)
- Youngstown and Steps in Concert (2000)
- BBMak & M2M in Concert (2000)
- Jessica Simpson & Jason Raize in Concert (2000)
- 98 Degrees & Hoku in Concert (2000)
- Aaron Carter & Samantha Mumba in Concert (2001)
