= Home for Christmas (NSYNC album) =

1998 studio album by NSYNC

Studio album by NSYNC
- Released: November 10, 1998
- Recorded: 1998
- Genres: Christmas; dance-pop
- Length: 55:36
- Labels: Trans Continental; BMG; RCA
- Producers: Gary Carolla; Danny Madden; John Poppo; Veit Renn; Peter Ries; Evan Rogers; Carl Sturken; Ric Wake; Robin Wiley; Johnny Wright (exec.)

NSYNC chronology
'N Sync (1997)	Home for Christmas (1998)	The Winter Album (1998)

Singles from Home for Christmas
- 1. "Merry Christmas, Happy Holidays" Released: November 24, 1998

Professional ratings
Review scores
Source	Rating
AllMusic	2.5/5 stars
Entertainment Weekly	C
The Rolling Stone Album Guide	2/5 stars

Home for Christmas is the second studio album by American boy band NSYNC. The album was released, exclusively in the United States, on November 10, 1998, by RCA Records following the success of their self-titled debut album. On October 27, 1999, Home for Christmas was certified Double Platinum by the RIAA for shipment of two million copies in the United States. Home for Christmas was released on September 30, 2002, in the United Kingdom as The Meaning of Christmas on Ariola Express with an altered track listing.

"Merry Christmas, Happy Holidays" was released as a single in the United States, and in Germany as well, due to its inclusion on the group's German seasonal album, The Winter Album. As of December 2014, Home for Christmas has sold 2.8 million copies in the United States, making it the fifteenth best-selling Christmas/holiday album in the U.S. since Nielsen SoundScan started tracking music sales in 1991.

== Critical reception ==
During its time of release in 1998, Home for Christmas was met with lukewarm to negative reviews from critics who derided the song lyrics as “sentimental-sounding non sequiturs” and contended the group did not have the same charisma of fellow pop groups like the Backstreet Boys or the Spice Girls. At Rate Your Music, a website where users submit reviews, Home for Christmas was given a very low rating: 1.43 out of 5. However, critics also praised the album for having eleven original tracks, as well as for its “slickly produced adult contemporary ballads and lite dance-pop”.

In the years since, the album has been commended for its five-part harmonies, displayed in songs such as the group's a capella of “O Holy Night.” It is also known as an NSYNC album that gives Chris Kirkpatrick, Joey Fatone, and Lance Bass vocal opportunities.

== Track listing ==
Most of the lead vocals are provided by Justin Timberlake and JC Chasez.

- "Under My Tree", "I Guess It's Christmas Time" has lead vocals provided by Chris Kirkpatrick
- "All I Want Is You This Christmas", "It's Christmas" has lead vocals provided by Kirkpatrick and Joey Fatone
- "The Only Gift" has lead vocals provided by Kirkpatrick, Fatone and Lance Bass

Home for Christmas — Standard version
No.	Title	Writer(s)	Producer(s)	Length
1.	"Home for Christmas"	Gary Haase; Rozz Morehead	John Poppo; Danny Madden^{[a]}	4:28
2.	"Under My Tree"	Shelly Peiken; Guy Roche	Veit Renn	4:32
3.	"I Never Knew the Meaning of Christmas"	Carl Sturken; Evan Rogers	Struken; Rogers	4:45
4.	"Merry Christmas, Happy Holidays"	JC Chasez; Justin Timberlake; Renn	Renn	4:12
5.	"The Christmas Song"	Mel Tormé; Robert Wells	Gary Carolla	3:16
6.	"I Guess It's Christmas Time"	Peiken; Peter S. Bliss	Carolla	3:52
7.	"All I Want Is You This Christmas"	Martin Briley; Dana Calitri	Renn	3:43
8.	"The First Noel"	Traditional	Carolla	3:28
9.	"In Love on Christmas"	Rory Bennett; Cedric Hailey; Joel Hailey	Renn	4:06
10.	"It's Christmas"	Peter Ries; Cherie C. Thomas	Carolla; Ries	4:29
11.	"O Holy Night"	Traditional	Robin Wiley	3:33
12.	"Love's in Our Hearts on Christmas Day"	Haase	Renn	3:54
13.	"The Only Gift"	Maria Christensen; Jeff Franzel	Renn	3:51
14.	"Kiss Me at Midnight"	Renn; Kenny Lamb	Renn	3:28

Deluxe version bonus tracks
No.	Title	Writer(s)	Producer(s)	Length
15.	"I Don't Wanna Spend One More Christmas Without You"	Andrew Fromm; Sandy Linzer; Franzel	Renn	4:02
16.	"You Don't Have to Be Alone"	Chasez; Renn; David Nicoll	Renn	4:32

The Meaning of Christmas — Standard version
No.	Title	Length
1.	"I Guess It's Christmas Time"
2.	"Merry Christmas, Happy Holidays"
3.	"I Never Knew the Meaning of Christmas"
4.	"Love's in Our Hearts on Christmas Day"
5.	"Home for Christmas"
6.	"In Love on Christmas"
7.	"The Only Gift"
8.	"It's Christmas"
9.	"All I Want Is You This Christmas"
10.	"God Must Have Spent a Little More Time on You" (Remix)
11.	"Kiss Me at Midnight"
12.	"The Christmas Song"
13.	"The First Noel"
14.	"O Holy Night"

Notes

- ^{^[a]} signifies a vocal co-producer

== Personnel ==
Credits adapted from album's liner notes.

NSYNC

- Lance Bass – backing and occasional lead vocals (bass)
- JC Chasez – lead and backing vocals (first tenor/melody)
- Joey Fatone – backing and occasional lead vocals (baritone)
- Chris Kirkpatrick – backing and lead vocals (countertenor/falsetto)
- Justin Timberlake – lead and backing vocals (second tenor/melody)

Additional personnel

- Troy Antunes — bass (track 7)
- Lou Appel — drums and percussion (track 1)
- Joey Argero — bass (tracks 5, 6)
- Alan "Double A" Armitage — mixing assistant (tracks 2–9, 12–14)
- Billy Ashbaugh — drums (track 7)
- Adam Barber — engineer (tracks 2, 4, 7, 9, 11–14, 16)
- Johann Bast — strings (track 12)
- Tony Battaglia — guitars (track 7)
- David Bjella — strings (track 12)
- Joanie Bjella — strings (track 12)
- Scott Bliege — horns (track 6)
- Gary Carolla — producer (tracks 5, 6, 8, 10), keyboards and drums (5, 6, 8), arranger (5, 8), vocal arranger (10)
- Deborah Cole — additional vocals (track 1)
- Tom Coyne — mastering
- Frank Delour — drums and percussion (track 1)
- Rob Dorsey — drums and percussion (track 1)
- Lisa Ferrigno — strings (track 12)
- Keith Fluitt — additional vocals (track 1)
- Andricka Hall — additional vocals (track 1)
- Lawrence Hamilton — additional vocals (track 1)
- Matt Harris — assistant engineer (tracks 2–5, 7, 9, 11–14)
- Al Henberger — engineer (track 3)
- Ben Holt — assistant engineer (track 1)
- Manfred Honetschläger — strings arranger and conductor (track 10)
- John James — additional vocals (track 1)
- Stephanie James — additional vocals (track 1)
- Jürgen Kaiser — strings engineer (track 10)
- Mark Kiczula — assistant engineer (tracks 1, 5)
- Jim Kimball — engineer (track 11)
- Steve MacAuley — engineer (track 8)
- Danny Madden — vocal co-producer (track 1)
- Pat McMakin — mixing (track 11)
- Ann Mincieli — assistant engineer (track 1)
- Frank Motnik — assistant strings engineer (track 10)
- John Poppo — producer, arranger, engineer, and mixing (track 1)
- Jim Porreca — engineer (tracks 5, 6), assistant engineer (5)
- Jason Rea — assistant engineer (track 1)
- Giles Reaves — assistant engineer (track 11)
- Mia S. Rebel — additional vocals (track 1)
- Veit Renn — producer (tracks 2, 4, 7, 9, 12–16), guitar (4), strings arranger and conductor (12)
- Mike Rew — assistant engineer (track 1)
- Nicki Richards — additional vocals (track 1)
- Peter Ries — producer, engineer, mixing, keyboards, and programming (track 10)
- Evan Rogers — producer (track 3)
- Don Rogozinski — horns (track 6)
- Jennie Rudberg — strings (track 12)
- Peter "Ski" Schwartz — keyboard arrangements, string arrangements, and additional vocal arrangements (track 1)
- Mark Silverman — assistant engineer (tracks 2–4, 7, 9, 11–14)
- Andre Smith — additional vocals (track 1)
- Joe Smith — mixing (tracks 2–9, 12–14)
- Brian Snapp — saxophone (track 7)
- Carl Sturken — producer (track 3)
- Chris Trevett – mixing (track 16)
- Mike Tucker — engineer (tracks 3, 5, 6, 8, 10), additional vocal engineering (1)
- Voices of Praise — additional choir vocals (track 4)
- Rex Wertz — horns (track 6)
- Robin Wiley — producer and arranger (track 11)

== Charts ==
=== Weekly charts ===
Chart (1998)	Peak position
Canada Top Albums/CDs (RPM)	29
US Billboard 200	7
US Top Catalog Albums (Billboard)	2
US Top Holiday Albums (Billboard)	5

Chart (2023–2024)	Peak position
Canadian Albums (Billboard)	48

=== Year-end charts ===
Chart (1999)	Position
US Billboard 200	58

== Certifications and sales ==
Region	Certification	Certified units/sales
Canada (Music Canada)	Platinum	100,000^{^}
United States (RIAA)	2× Platinum	2,000,000^{^}
^{^} Shipments figures based on certification alone.
