= Merry Christmas, Happy Holidays =

Single by NSYNC

from the album The Winter Album and Home for Christmas
- B-side: "All I Want Is You (This Christmas)"
- Released: November 24, 1998
- Recorded: 1998
- Genre: Christmas, pop, R&B
- Length: 4:12; 3:26 (single edit)
- Label: RCA
- Songwriters: JC Chasez, Veit Renn, Justin Timberlake, Vincent Degiorgio
- Producer: Veit Renn

NSYNC singles chronology
"(God Must Have Spent) A Little More Time on You" (1998)	"Merry Christmas, Happy Holidays" (1998)	"Thinking of You (I Drive Myself Crazy)" (1999)

Music videos
- "Merry Christmas, Happy Holidays" on YouTube; "Merry Christmas, Happy Holidays" (animated version) on YouTube

"Merry Christmas, Happy Holidays" is a song by American boy band NSYNC. It was released on November 29, 1998 as the first and only single from their second studio album, Home for Christmas and was also featured on the end credits of the 1998 Disney Christmas movie I'll Be Home For Christmas. The song charted at #37 on the Top 40 Mainstream chart. The single was also the second from NSYNC's European seasonal album, The Winter Album. A cappella group Pentatonix covered the song in their 2016 Christmas album, A Pentatonix Christmas. The song has also been covered by American singer David Archuleta for the deluxe version of his album Winter in the Air in 2019, and by singer-songwriter Betty Who for Spotify Singles in 2020. In 2021, popular Christian singer Tauren Wells covered "Merry Christmas, Happy Holidays" as a non album single.

== Critical reception ==
Stephen Thomas Erlewine reviewed the song in the context of Home for Christmas, and gave the following review:

It's always a sign that a group is hot if they release a holiday album mere months after their debut. That's the case with *NSYNC. Their debut was released in America in late March, and in early December, Home for Christmas hit the shelves. Much of the album is devoted to newer material, such as the anthemic "Merry Christmas, Happy Holidays", and only a handful of songs qualifying as standards: "The Christmas Song," "The First Noel," and "O Holy Night." All of it is given the familiar *NSYNC sheen, alternating between slickly produced adult contemporary ballads and lite dance-pop.

== Music video ==
The video was directed by Lionel C. Martin and filmed in a day. All five members of NSYNC had creative input for the direction of the video, as they wanted it to "be pop, fun, and energetic." This also included their request to include Gary Coleman as an elf in the video, which Martin described as "a little tricky" to secure on board. The classic sitcom Diff'rent Strokes is referenced when NSYNC ask "Whatchu talkin' about, Gary?", based on Coleman's catchphrase; "Whatchu talkin' about, Willis?". Coleman's agent didn't approve of him saying the line, as it was owned by NBC. The video debuted on TRL on December 14, 1998 and became the band’s third video to reach number one on the countdown at the time.

== Track listing ==
1. "Merry Christmas, Happy Holidays" – 4:12
2. "All I Want Is You (This Christmas)" – 3:16

== Charts ==
Chart (1998)	Peak position
US Pop Airplay (Billboard)	37

Chart (2013–2024)	Peak position
Austria (Ö3 Austria Top 40)	74
Germany (GfK)	57
Global 200 (Billboard)	97
Switzerland (Schweizer Hitparade)	85
US Streaming Songs (Billboard)	47
US Holiday 100 (Billboard)	37
US Holiday Airplay (Billboard)	36

== Certifications ==
Region	Certification	Certified units/sales
Canada (Music Canada)	Platinum	80,000^{‡}
United Kingdom (BPI)	Silver	200,000^{‡}
^{‡} Sales+streaming figures based on certification alone.

== Release history ==
Region	Date	Format	Label	Ref.
United States	November 24, 1998	Contemporary hit radio; rhythmic contemporary radio	Jive	

== David Archuleta version ==
In 2019, David Archuleta covered “Merry Christmas, Happy Holidays” for the deluxe version of his Christmas album Winter in the Air. The accompanying music video features NSYNC members Chris Kirkpatrick and Lance Bass in cameos.
