= NSYNC (album) =

1997 studio album by NSYNC

'NSYNC
- The first release cover. The US and International versions have a different cover, while the Japanese releases have 2 alternative artworks.

Studio album by NSYNC
- Released: May 26, 1997
- Recorded: 1996–1997
- Genres: Dance-pop; pop; R&B; teen pop
- Length: 56:18
- Labels: Trans Continental; RCA
- Producers: Bülent Aris; Frank Busch; Full Force; Gary Carolla; Toni Cottura; Jaap Eggermont; Jörn-Uwe Fahrenkrog-Petersen; Kristian Lundin; Max Martin; Andreas von Oertzen (exec.); Denniz Pop; Evan Rogers; Rollocks; Carl Sturken; V. D. Toorn; Johnny Wright (exec.)

NSYNC chronology
'NSYNC (1997)	Home for Christmas (1998)

Alternate artwork
- US and international edition cover

Singles from 'NSYNC
- 1. "I Want You Back" Released: October 7, 1996; 2. "Tearin' Up My Heart" Released: February 10, 1997; 3. "Here We Go" Released: May 5, 1997; 4. "For the Girl Who Has Everything" Released: August 18, 1997; 5. "Together Again" Released: November 8, 1997; 6. "U Drive Me Crazy" Released: September 27, 1998; 7. "(God Must Have Spent) A Little More Time on You" Released: February 9, 1999; 8. "I Drive Myself Crazy" Released: April 1, 1999

'NSYNC (Note: The album has 2 different titles, 'N Sync and *NSYNC. Some store also listed the album as N-Sync.) is the debut studio album by American boy band NSYNC, initially released in Germany on May 26, 1997, by Trans Continental Records, and internationally on March 24, 1998, by RCA Records. The album reached number one on the Offizielle Top 100 and includes the singles "I Want You Back" and "Tearin' Up My Heart".

The album has since sold over 15 million copies worldwide, with the album earning a Diamond certification in the US, as well as peaking at number 2 on the Billboard 200.

== Background ==
=== Band formation ===
In 1995, Chris Kirkpatrick met with Lou Pearlman to talk about forming a pop group. Pearlman said that he would finance the group if Kirkpatrick would find other young male singers to be with him in the band. This prompted Kirkpatrick to start forming the group, so he called Justin Timberlake who had been a member of the Mickey Mouse Club. Justin joined and recommended his friend Joshua "JC" Chasez, who also was a cast member on the Mickey Mouse Club. Later, the three bumped into Joey Fatone, whom they all knew, at a club and he became the fourth member to join.

Initially, Jason Galasso was chosen as the group's bass singer and fifth member. After several weeks of rehearsals, the group set up a showcase and began planning to officially sign with Pearlman's Trans Continental Label. However, at the last minute, Galasso dropped out as he was not fond of the group's musical direction, claiming that being a teen idol was never a goal of his. The group started to search for people to replace Galasso. Timberlake soon called his vocal coach, who suggested a 16-year-old from Mississippi named Lance Bass, who flew to Orlando to audition and was immediately accepted into the group.

=== Recording ===
The newly-formed group began recording demos in closets, which eventually became "Sailing" and "Giddy Up". NSYNC were given an offer to record in Shaquille O'Neal's house in Orlando after he heard them sing the national anthem. During the production of "Sailing", an instrumental was placed before NSYNC started layering the track with harmonies and vocals, while "Giddy Up" was created from a vocal jam session through a computer. The band also recorded in the studio of producer Veit Renn, who used mattresses to create a soundproof environment.

Eventually, the group signed to BMG Ariola Munich, and were sent to Stockholm to begin working on their debut album with the help of producers such as Denniz Pop, Max Martin and Andreas Carlsson around July–August 1996. Initially, the band were recording songs similar to that of Boyz II Men, but had to switch their sound in order to accommodate to the dance-oriented European market. Due to his fascination of Robyn's sound, Pop decided to incorporate Robyn's style into NSYNC's music by combining their R&B vocals with pop tracks.

== Singles ==
=== Initial release ===
The album's official lead single, "I Want You Back", was released in Germany on January 15, 1997, and reached the top 10 on November 18, 1997. The group's second single, "Tearin' Up My Heart", was released on February 10, 1997, also peaking within the top 10. The third single, "Here We Go", was released on May 5, 1997, just three weeks prior to the release of the album, to similar success. Their self-titled debut album was then released by BMG Ariola Munich on May 26, 1997, which peaked at number one on the second week of release in Germany. The group soon became an overnight success throughout much of Europe. The album also charted successfully in both Switzerland and Austria eventually selling 820,000 units in GSA (Germany, Switzerland, Austria) region and Eastern Europe. Two further singles, "For the Girl Who Has Everything" and "Together Again", were subsequently released on August 18 and November 3, 1997, respectively, achieving success in Germany and other European territories.

=== International breakthrough ===
Following their success of their début album in several European territories, the band captured the attention of Vincent DeGiorgio, an A&R rep for RCA Records. After watching the group perform a rendition of their single "Together Again" in Budapest in November 1997, he offered them a record deal with RCA, which the group immediately agreed to. On January 20, 1998, their first German single, "I Want You Back", was released in both the United Kingdom and the United States, becoming their first single in both territories, achieving success on both the UK Singles Chart and the Billboard Hot 100. Around this time, RCA Records announced that they wished to release the group's debut album, which was previously only released in Germany, in both the U.K. and the U.S., however, wanted to make adjustments to suit both markets. This resulted in the tracks "Riddle", "Best of My Life", "More Than a Feeling", "Together Again" and "Forever Young" being cut altogether, and new mixes of "I Want You Back", "Tearin' Up My Heart" and "For the Girl Who Has Everything" being recorded. The new version of the album also included four new tracks: "I Just Wanna Be with You", "(God Must Have Spent) A Little More Time on You", "Everything I Own", "Thinking of You (I Drive Myself Crazy)". This version of the album was subsequently released in the United States on March 24, 1998.

On June 30, 1998, the group's second German single, "Tearin' Up My Heart", was released in both the U.K. and the U.S., once again achieving success on both charts. Further edits were made for the British version of the album, including remixes of "Thinking of You (I Drive Myself Crazy)", "(God Must Have Spent) A Little More Time on You" and "For the Girl Who Has Everything", plus an all-new track, "U Drive Me Crazy", written exclusively for the British market. This version of the album was released in the UK on July 5, 1998. At first, sales of the album were mediocre in both British and American territories, until the band's worldwide broadcast Disney Channel in Concert special in 1998. After the concert was aired, sales of the album began to skyrocket. It reached number two on the Billboard 200 and shipped over 10 million copies in the United States alone, making it certified 10× Platinum and earning the group an RIAA diamond award. On February 9, 1999, a third single from the new version of the album, "(God Must Have Spent) A Little More Time on You", was released exclusively in the United States, peaking at #8 on the Billboard Hot 100. "Thinking of You (I Drive Myself Crazy)", the final single, was released days later. Though "I Drive Myself Crazy" did not crack the top 40 on Billboard, its music video was in heavy rotation on MTV show TRL, spending a total of 40 days in the number 1 position. The group then went on to become the #3 top-selling boy-band group of all time.

== Commercial performance ==
Professional ratings
Review scores
Source	Rating
AllMusic	3/5 stars
Robert Christgau	(neither)
The Rolling Stone Album Guide	1/5 stars
Sputnikmusic	2/5 stars

The album debuted at number eighty two on the Billboard 200 the week of April 11, 1998, with sales of approximately 14,000 units. After six months, on October 10, 1998, the album reached and peaked at number 2 on the chart and remained on it for one hundred and nine weeks. It spent a total of thirty weeks inside the top 10. The album spent three weeks at number 2 from September 1998 to January 1999. It peaked behind three different number-one blockbuster albums: Lauryn Hill's The Miseducation of Lauryn Hill, Garth Brooks' Double Live and Britney Spears' ...Baby One More Time. According to Nielsen SoundScan, it was the fifth best selling record of 1998 in the United States with 4,400,000 copies sold. The album was certified ten times platinum by the RIAA on January 5, 2000, denoting shipments of ten millions. The album has sold 9,854,000 copies in the US according to Nielsen Music (as of March, 2015) with an additional 1.50 million units at the BMG Music Club (as of early 2003). In the United Kingdom the album debuted and peaked at number 30 on July 11, 1999, and remained on the chart for only three weeks. Worldwide, the album has sold 15,540,000 copies.

The album was ranked as the 137th best album of all time on the Billboard Top 200 Albums of All Time.

== Track listing ==
Lead vocals provided by JC Chasez and Justin Timberlake except on "Thinking of You (I Drive Myself Crazy)", where Chris Kirkpatrick sings lead on the opening verses followed by Chris Kirkpatrick and Joey Fatone on "Together Again", where Chris & Justin sing lead.

German edition
No.	Title	Writer(s)	Producer(s)	Length
1.	"Tearin' Up My Heart"	Max Martin; Kristian Lundin	Lundin	4:47
2.	"You Got It"	Veit Renn	Renn	3:32
3.	"Sailing"	Christopher Cross	Renn	4:36
4.	"Crazy for You"	Christian Hamm; Alain Bertoni	Gary Carolla	3:41
5.	"Riddle"	Pat Reiniz	Renn	3:40
6.	"For the Girl Who Has Everything"	Jolyon Skinner; Renn	Renn	3:51
7.	"I Need Love"	Carolla	Carolla	3:14
8.	"Giddy Up"	NSYNC; Renn	Renn	4:09
9.	"Here We Go"	Bülent Aris; Toni Cottura	Aris; Cottura; V. D. Toorn (co.); Rollocks (co.)	3:35
10.	"Best of My Life"	Aris; Cottura; Toorn	Aris; Cottura; Toorn	4:46
11.	"More Than a Feeling"	Tom Scholz	Jaap Eggermont	3:42
12.	"I Want You Back"	Denniz Pop; Martin	Pop; Martin	4:24
13.	"Together Again"	Andy Reynolds; Tee Green	Corolla; Renn (vocal)	4:11
14.	"Forever Young"	Jean Beauvoir; Bettina Martinelli; Nemo Fahrenkrog-Petersen	Jörn-Uwe Fahrenkrog-Petersen; Frank Busch	4:09
Total length:				56:18

Japanese edition (bonus tracks)
No.	Title	Writer(s)	Producer(s)	Length
15.	"Tearin' Up My Heart" (Radio Edit)	Martin; Lundin	Lundin	3:29
16.	"I Want You Back" (Radio Edit)	Pop; Martin	Pop; Martin	3:22
Total length:				63:09

US edition
No.	Title	Writer(s)	Producer(s)	Length
1.	"Tearin' Up My Heart" (Radio Edit)	Martin; Lundin	Lundin	3:30
2.	"I Just Wanna Be with You"	Full Force	Full Force	4:03
3.	"Here We Go"	Aris; Cottura	Aris; Cottura; V. D. Toorn (co.); Rollocks (co.)	3:35
4.	"For the Girl Who Has Everything"	Renn; Skinner	Renn	3:45
5.	"(God Must Have Spent) A Little More Time on You"	Carl Sturken; Evan Rogers	Sturken; Rogers	4:42
6.	"You Got It"	Renn	Renn	3:22
7.	"I Need Love"	Carolla	Carolla	3:14
8.	"I Want You Back" (Radio Edit)	Pop; Martin	Pop; Martin	3:21
9.	"Everything I Own"	David Gates	Full Force	3:57
10.	"Thinking of You (I Drive Myself Crazy)"	Rick Nowels; Allan Rich; Ellen Shipley	Renn	4:00
11.	"Crazy for You"	Hamm; Bertoni	Carolla	3:40
12.	"Sailing"	Cross	Renn	4:38
13.	"Giddy Up"	NSYNC; Renn	Renn	4:08
Total length:				50:55

British edition
No.	Title	Writer(s)	Producer(s)	Length
1.	"Tearin' Up My Heart" (Radio Edit)	Martin; Lundin	Lundin	3:35
2.	"I Just Wanna Be with You"	Full Force	Full Force	4:03
3.	"Here We Go" (Radio Cut)	Aris; Cottura	Aris; Cottura	3:33
4.	"For the Girl Who Has Everything" (Club Mix)	Renn; Skinner	Renn	3:46
5.	"(God Must Have Spent) A Little More Time on You" (Remix)	Sturken; Rogers	Sturken; Rogers; Joe Smith^{[a]}; Tony Battaglia^{[a]}	4:02
6.	"You Got It"	Renn	Renn	3:33
7.	"I Need Love"	Carolla	Carolla	3:14
8.	"I Want You Back" (Radio Edit)	Pop; Martin	Pop; Martin	3:12
9.	"Everything I Own"	Gates	Full Force	3:59
10.	"Thinking of You (I Drive Myself Crazy)" (Remix)	Nowels; Rich; Shipley	Renn	4:00
11.	"Crazy for You"	Hamm; Bertoni	Carolla	3:42
12.	"Sailing"	Cross	Renn	4:36
13.	"Giddy Up"	NSYNC; Renn	Renn	4:09
14.	"U Drive Me Crazy" (Radio Edit)	Aris; Cottura; Rookee; Toorn; Rollocks	Aris; Cottura; Rookee	3:34
Total length:				53:57

Australia / Japanese re-issue (bonus tracks)
No.	Title	Length
14.	"Sailing" (Live Version)	4:39
15.	"More Than a Feeling"	3:43
16.	"Some Dreams"	3:45
17.	"Tearin' Up My Heart" (Phat Dub)	6:32
18.	"I Want You Back" (Back Beat Radio Edit)	3:42
Total length:		72:44

Taiwanese bonus DVD
No.	Title	Writer(s)	Length
1.	"Tearin' Up My Heart"	Lundin; Max Martin	3:35
2.	"Here We Go"	Bonny Aris; Toni Cottura	3:33
3.	"For the Girl Who Has Everything"	Jolyon Skinner; Veit Renn	3:46
4.	"God Must Have Spent a Little More Time on You"	Sturken; Rogers	4:02
5.	"I Want You Back"	Pop; Martin	3:12
6.	"I Drive Myself Crazy"	Rick Nowels; Allan Rich; Ellen Shipley	4:00
7.	"U Drive Me Crazy"	Lundin; Martin	3:34
Total length:			25:42

Singapore bonus disc
No.	Title	Writer(s)	Length
1.	"U Drive Me Crazy" (Extended Version)	Lundin; Martin	4:42
2.	"For the Girl Who Has Everything" (Unplugged Version)	Skinner; Renn	4:18
3.	"Some Dreams"	Skinner; Renn	4:18
4.	"Riddle"	Pat Reiniz	3:41
5.	"Best of My Life"	Bonny Aris; Toni Cottura; V.D. Toorn	4:46
6.	"More Than a Feeling"	Tom Scholz	3:42
7.	"Together Again"	Andy Reynolds; Tee Green	4:09
8.	"Forever Young"	Jean Beauvoir; Bettina Martinelli; Nemo Fahrenkrog-Peterson	4:07
9.	"The Lion Sleeps Tonight"	Solomon Linda; Hugo Peretti; Luigi Creatore; George David Weiss; Albert Stanton	3:03
Total length:			36:46

Notes

- ^{^[a]} signifies an additional producer
- "I Just Wanna Be with You" contains portions of "Family Affair", as written by Sly Stone.

== Charts ==
=== Weekly charts ===
Chart (1997–1998)	Peak position
Australian Albums (ARIA)	58
Austrian Albums (Ö3 Austria)	2
Canada Top Albums/CDs (RPM)	4
Dutch Albums (Album Top 100)	59
Estonian Albums (Eesti Top 10)	8
European Albums Chart	8
German Albums (Offizielle Top 100)	1
Hungarian Albums (MAHASZ)	3
Malaysian Albums (IFPI)	9
New Zealand Albums (RMNZ)	34
Norwegian Albums (VG-lista)	40
Scottish Albums (Official Charts)	54
Swedish Albums (Sverigetopplistan)	56
Swiss Albums (Schweizer Hitparade)	5
UK Albums (Official Charts)	30
US Billboard 200	2
US Top Catalog Albums (Billboard)	13

=== Year-end charts ===
Chart (1997)	Position
Austrian Albums (Ö3 Austria)	35
German Albums (Offizielle Top 100)	40
Chart (1998)	Position
Canada Top Albums/CDs (RPM)	18
US Billboard 200	22
Chart (1999)	Position
US Billboard 200	4
Chart (2000)	Position
US Billboard 200	93

=== Decade-end charts ===
Chart (1990–1999)	Position
US Billboard 200	17

== Certifications and sales ==
Region	Certification	Certified units/sales
Austria (IFPI Austria)	Gold	25,000^{*}
Canada (Music Canada)	4× Platinum	400,000^{^}
Germany (BVMI)	Gold	250,000^{^}
Malaysia	—	50,000
Poland (ZPAV)	Gold	50,000^{*}
Switzerland (IFPI Switzerland)	Gold	25,000^{^}
United Kingdom (BPI)	Silver	60,000^{‡}
United States (RIAA)	Diamond	10,000,000^{^} / 11,354,000 (Note: As of March 2015, the album has sold 9,854,000 copies in the US according to Nielsen SoundScan, which does not count albums sold through clubs like the BMG Music Club, where it sold 1.50 million units. Combined, it has sold over 11,354,000 copies in the United States.)
^{*} Sales figures based on certification alone.^{^} Shipments figures based on certification alone.^{‡} Sales+streaming figures based on certification alone.

== Release history ==
Country	Date	Format	Label	Ref.
Germany	May 26, 1997	CD single	Ariola	
Japan	November 1, 1997	CD	Sony	
United States	March 24, 1998	CD; cassette	RCA	
Japan	June 5, 1999	CD	Sony	
United Kingdom	July 5, 1999	CD; cassette	Northwestside	
Germany	January 12, 2018	LP	Music on Vinyl	
United Kingdom	January 19, 2018	LP	Music on Vinyl	

== Credits ==
=== NSYNC ===
- Chris Kirkpatrick – countertenor/falsetto vocals
- JC Chasez – tenor vocals
- Justin Timberlake – tenor vocals
- Joey Fatone – baritone vocals
- Lance Bass – bass vocals

== See also ==
- List of best-selling albums in the United States
