= Together Again (NSYNC song) =

1997 single by NSYNC

Single by NSYNC

from the album 'N Sync
- B-side: "Giddy Up"; "Some Dreams"
- Released: October 31, 1997
- Length: 4:09
- Label: Trans Continental; BMG Ariola
- Songwriters: Andy Reynolds; Tee Green
- Producer: Gary Carolla

NSYNC singles chronology
"For the Girl Who Has Everything" (1997)	"Together Again" (1997)	"U Drive Me Crazy" (1998)

Audio video
- "Together Again" on YouTube

"Together Again" is a song recorded by American boy band NSYNC for their self-titled debut album (1997). It was released as the fifth single from the album on October 31, 1997, by Trans Continental Records and BMG Ariola. The song was written by Andy Reynolds and Tee Green and produced by Gary Carolla.

== Music video ==
The music video for "Together Again" premiered in September 1997. The video features the band performing in a Christmas playroom, reminiscing about their own childhoods. The video shows pictures of the boys when they were younger, and changes the theme of the song to relate to the break-up between their selves and their parents. The video also shows the boys celebrating Christmas together.

== Track listing ==
- CD single
1. "Together Again" (radio edit) – 3:25
2. "Together Again" (album version) – 4:09
3. "Giddy Up" – 4:07
4. "Some Dreams" – 4:18

== Charts ==
Chart (1997)	Peak position
Germany (GfK)	27

== Release history ==
Region	Date	Format	Label	Ref.
Germany	October 31, 1997	CD single	Trans Continental; BMG Ariola	
