= For the Girl Who Has Everything (song) =

1997 single by NSYNC

Single by NSYNC

from the album 'N Sync
- B-side: "The Lion Sleeps Tonight"
- Released: September 5, 1997
- Recorded: December 1996
- Genre: R&B; pop
- Length: 3:51 (Album Version); 3:56 (Radio Mix)
- Label: RCA
- Songwriters: Joylon Skinner, Veit Renn
- Producers: Joylon Skinner, Veit Renn

NSYNC singles chronology
"Here We Go" (1997)	"For the Girl Who Has Everything" (1997)	"Together Again" (1997)

Audio video
- "For the Girl Who Has Everything" on YouTube

"For the Girl Who Has Everything" is a song by American boy band NSYNC. It was released as the fourth single from their self-titled debut album. It was released in August 1997, exclusively on the German market. The track was later included on the US version of their debut album. This is the first ballad song of the group. The lyrics tell about a lady who has everything (mostly material) except love, and the speaker is willing to give her love.

== Composition ==
"For the Girl Who Has Everything" is a teen pop and contemporary R&B song with latin, soul, tejano, reggae, and funk elements. The song is composed in the key of D minor and is set in the time signature of 4/4 common time, with a moderately slow tempo of 85 beats per minute. Sheet music published at Musicnotes.com shows that the vocal range of the members of NSYNC spans from D_{4} to A_{5}.

== Music video ==
The video premiered on terrestrial television in August 1997. The video features the band stranded on a beach, attempting to send messages to a lady, in an attempt to get her to rescue them. The video intertwines clips of the band with clips of the wealthy, yet lonely girl, who has been left at home on her birthday by her parents. The girl, being cared for by household staff, seems to have everything except love. The video was partly recorded in the north of Spain, in Santander. The version of the video included on 'N the Mix is adjusted to the remix of the song, which had Justin Timberlake sing the second verse in place of JC Chasez.

== Track listing ==
CD1

1. "For the Girl Who Has Everything" (Radio Mix) – 3:56
2. "For the Girl Who Has Everything" (Album Version) – 3:51

CD2

1. "For the Girl Who Has Everything" (Radio Mix) – 3:56
2. "For the Girl Who Has Everything" (Album Version) – 3:51
3. "For the Girl Who Has Everything" (Unplugged) – 4:19
4. "The Lion Sleeps Tonight" (Solomon Linda; Hugo Peretti; Luigi Creatore; George David Weiss; Albert Stanton) – 3:10
5. "For the Girl Who Has Everything" (Video) – 4:07

== Charts ==
Chart (1997)	Peak position
Austria (Ö3 Austria Top 40)	32
Estonia (Eesti Top 20)	11
Germany (GfK)	32
Switzerland (Schweizer Hitparade)	22

== Release history ==
Region	Date	Format	Label	Ref.
Germany	September 5, 1997	CD single	Sony	
