= Here We Go (NSYNC song) =

1997 single by NSYNC

Single by NSYNC

from the album 'N Sync
- Released: May 5, 1997
- Length: 3:34
- Label: Trans Continental; BMG Ariola
- Songwriters: Bülent Aris; Toni Cottura
- Producers: Bülent Aris; Toni Cottura

NSYNC singles chronology
"Tearin' Up My Heart" (1997)	"Here We Go" (1997)	"For the Girl Who Has Everything" (1997)

Music video
- "Here We Go" on YouTube

"Here We Go" is a song recorded by American boy band NSYNC for their self-titled debut album (1997). It was released as the third single from the album on May 5, 1997, by Trans Continental Records and BMG Ariola. The song was written and produced by Bülent Aris and Toni Cottura.

== Music video ==
The music video premiered on terrestrial television in April 1997. The video features the group performing at a basketball game, with the song being used as the home team's main theme. It also shows members of the band participating in the game, and features them performing with cheerleaders during the chorus. The chorus features the vocals of NSYNC answered by the cheering crowd shouting "Yes yes yes, here we go, NSYNC has got the flow". The video was filmed in Vienna at the American International School.

== Track listing ==
- CD single
1. "Here We Go" (radio cut) – 3:34
2. "Here We Go" (StoneBridge radio version) – 3:50
- CD maxi single
1. "Here We Go" (radio cut) – 3:34
2. "Here We Go" (StoneBridge radio version) – 3:50
3. "Here We Go" (StoneBridge club mix) – 7:42
4. "Here We Go" (Hudson & Junior remix) – 4:51
5. "Here We Go" (extended mix) – 4:01

== Charts ==
=== Weekly charts ===
Chart (1997)	Peak position
Austria (Ö3 Austria Top 40)	8
Estonia Airplay (Eesti Top 25)	9
Europe (Eurochart Hot 100)	31
Germany (GfK)	8
Netherlands (Dutch Top 40 Tipparade)	10
Netherlands (Single Top 100)	66
Spain Airplay (Top 40 Radio)	34
Switzerland (Schweizer Hitparade)	5

=== Year-end charts ===
Chart (1997)	Position
Germany (Media Control)	76

== Release history ==
Region	Date	Format	Label	Ref.
Germany	May 5, 1997	CD single	Trans Continental; BMG Ariola	
