= Thinking of You (I Drive Myself Crazy) =

1999 single by NSYNC

Single by NSYNC

from the album 'N Sync and The Winter Album
- Released: February 15, 1999
- Studio: Trans Continental (Miami, Florida)
- Length: 4:00
- Label: RCA
- Songwriters: Rick Nowels, Allan Rich, Ellen Shipley
- Producer: Veit Renn

NSYNC singles chronology
"Merry Christmas, Happy Holidays" (1998)	"Thinking of You (I Drive Myself Crazy)" (1999)	"Music of My Heart" (1999)

Music video
- "Thinking of You (I Drive Myself Crazy)" on YouTube

"Thinking of You (I Drive Myself Crazy)" (titled "I Drive Myself Crazy" in the United States), is a song by American boy band NSYNC. It was released on February 22, 1999, as the seventh single in the German market and the fourth single from their self-titled debut album in the US. The track was also featured on the group's seasonal European album, The Winter Album. The song is notable as being one of the few songs where someone other than Justin Timberlake and JC Chasez sang lead vocals; Chris Kirkpatrick sings the first verse in the US version, while Chasez sang Kirkpatrick's part in the European version.

== Release ==
The song was released on February 22, 1999, as the seventh single in the German market and the fourth single from their self-titled debut album in the US. The track was also featured on the group's seasonal European album, The Winter Album.

== Music video ==
=== Background ===
The video was directed by Tim Story and debuted on April 1, 1999, during an episode of TRL. The version of the video featured on 'N the Mix is adjusted to feature the US version of the song. The video shows members of the band in an asylum, Camarillo State Mental Hospital, which closed in 1997. The viewer gets to see each man's torment as he remembers the girl who put him there. Each member came up with his own storyline.

=== Synopsis ===
A flashback shows Kirkpatrick ignoring his girlfriend as he talks on the cell phone, so she gets up and leaves. He sees visions of his girlfriend walking past him. Timberlake's flashback shows him trying to give a necklace to a girl, but she returns it and leaves and embraces another guy.

Chasez sees the girl who cheated on him on TV, on a show reminiscent of The Jerry Springer Show. He gets mad and starts shaking the tv after watching it again. Lance Bass reminisces to a scene where he is plucking the petals off a flower. His girlfriend sidles up to him, pulls a few petals off, but then leaves him. Joey Fatone is with his girlfriend, when another girl walks by and kisses him. His girlfriend slaps him and then leaves.

In the asylum, Fatone continually slaps himself in the face with a flyswatter. The scenes in the asylum gradually get more frenetic, with their normal expressions changing to crazed expressions, Chasez who attacked the TV and being restrained, Bass ripping up flowers and Fatone running around in a Superman costume. At the end the five are released, and the girls are shown being brought to the asylum instead, as the group run past and tease them.

== Track listing ==
1. "Thinking of You (I Drive Myself Crazy)" (Radio Edit) – 4:00
2. "Thinking of You (I Drive Myself Crazy)" (Riprock and Alex G's Crazy Driving Club Mix) – 4:00
3. "Thinking of You (I Drive Myself Crazy)" (Riprock and Alex G's Remix) – 3:26
4. "Thinking of You (I Drive Myself Crazy)" (U.S. Version) – 4:00
5. "Thinking of You (I Drive Myself Crazy)" (Riprock and Alex G's Smooth Haze Remix) – 3:46
6. "Thinking of You (I Drive Myself Crazy)" (CD-ROM Video) – 4:11

== Credits and personnel ==
Credits are taken from the "I Drive Myself Crazy" liner notes. Recording

- Recorded at Trans Continental Studio (Orlando, Florida)

Personnel

- Rick Nowles – songwriting
- Allan Rich – songwriting
- Ellen Shipley – songwriting
- Veit Renn – production
- Joe Smith – mixing
- Adam Barber – recording, mixing assistance
- Tony Battagllia – guitar

== Charts ==
=== Weekly charts ===
Chart (1999)	Peak position
Canada Top Singles (RPM)	16
Germany (GfK)	71
Netherlands (Dutch Top 40)	12
Netherlands (Single Top 100)	15
Netherlands Airplay (Music & Media)	6
Spain (AFYVE)	4
US Billboard Hot 100	67
US Pop Airplay (Billboard)	14
US Rhythmic Airplay (Billboard)	22

=== Year-end charts ===
Chart (1999)	Position
Canada Top Singles (RPM)	90
Netherlands (Dutch Top 40)	97
Netherlands (Single Top 100)	98
US Mainstream Top 40 (Billboard)	65
US Rhythmic Top 40 (Billboard)	83

== Release history ==
Region	Date	Format(s)	Label(s)	Ref.
Germany	February 15, 1999	CD single	Sony	
United States	March 16, 1999	Contemporary hit radio; rhythmic contemporary radio	Jive	
