= U Drive Me Crazy =

1998 single by NSYNC

Single by NSYNC

from the album The Winter Album and 'N Sync (UK version)
- Released: September 27, 1998
- Recorded: 1997
- Genre: Pop
- Length: 3:34
- Label: Trans Continental, BMG
- Songwriters: Bülent Aris, Toni Cottura, Rookee, Jan van der Toorn, G.J.O.R. Rollocks
- Producers: Bülent Aris, Toni Cottura, Rookee

NSYNC singles chronology
"Together Again" (1997)	"U Drive Me Crazy" (1998)	"(God Must Have Spent) A Little More Time on You" (1998)

Audio video
- "U Drive Me Crazy" on YouTube

"U Drive Me Crazy" is the first single taken from American boy band NSYNC's seasonal studio album, The Winter Album, as well as on the UK version of their self-titled debut album.

== Music video ==
=== Background ===
The video for "U Drive Me Crazy" was released in 1998 outside of the US, and was directed by Lionel C. Martin. Lou Pearlman is briefly seen in the video.

=== Synopsis ===
The video begins with a montage resembling a TV sitcom opening. The members of NSYNC are introduced in the apartment in a frame freeze; Justin is making a sandwich, Lance is making papier-mâché, JC is playing the guitar, Joey is reading "Girlymag" and Chris is trying to get his dog to pull him on his wagon. Lance sees an advertisement which states that a famous producer by the name of Johnny Correcto (played by their manager Johnny Wright) is looking for a new star.

They drive to the audition where they get rejected at the reception desk. Feeling dejected, the group notices a girl holding a bouquet of flowers and decide on a plan. They return to the hotel dressed as a glam metal band and while Justin distracts the receptionist with the flowers, the rest sneak in and play for Johnny before getting kicked out, dressing as Slash and Axl Rose from Guns N' Roses, as well as members from Twisted Sister.

The NSYNC members are able to figure out where Johnny is and attempt to play for him but are constantly rejected by the producer and the audience present. They arrive to a dinner for international dignitaries and pose as The Jackson 5, show up at a pool party dressed as the Spice Girls, and appear as rappers. The group eventually dance as themselves to the delight of the audience, as Johnny offers them a contract.

=== Reception ===
Rolling Stone noted that the video's message was about "being yourself", despite commenting on the absurdities of "dressing up in drag to distract a record executive's secretary or infiltrating a dinner party for world leaders dressed as, more or less, the Jackson 5."

== Track listings ==
1. "U Drive Me Crazy" (Radio Edit) – 3:34
2. "U Drive Me Crazy" (Extended Version) – 4:40
3. "U Drive Me Crazy" (2-4 Family 7" Remix) – 3:24
4. "U Drive Me Crazy" (Trime'n Delgado 12" Remix) – 5:33

== Charts ==
=== Weekly charts ===
Chart (1998–1999)	Peak position
Germany (GfK)	30
Italy Airplay (Music & Media)	6
Spain Airplay (Top 40 Radio)	11
Switzerland (Schweizer Hitparade)	29

== Release history ==
Region	Date	Format	Label	Ref.
United Kingdom	September 27, 1998	CD single	Sony	
Germany	October 2, 1998	CD single	Sony	
