= I Want You Back (NSYNC song) =

1996 single by NSYNC

- North American variant of the 1997 re-release cover art

Single by NSYNC

from the album NSYNC
- B-side: "You Got It"; "I Just Wanna Be with You"; "Everything I Own"; "Giddy Up"
- Released: October 15, 1996
- Recorded: 1996
- Studio: Cheiron (Stockholm, Sweden)
- Genre: Dance-pop; pop
- Length: 3:22
- Label: RCA
- Songwriters: Denniz Pop; Max Martin
- Producers: Pop; Martin

NSYNC singles chronology
"I Want You Back" (1996)	"Tearin' Up My Heart" (1997)

Music videos
- "I Want You Back" on YouTube; "I Want You Back" (US version) on YouTube

Alternative cover

"I Want You Back" is a song by American boy band NSYNC, from their self-titled debut album (1997). It was released in Germany on October 15, 1996, as the band's debut single. The dance-pop and pop song was later released in the United States on December 29, 1997, and in the United Kingdom on February 15, 1999. It was written and produced by Max Martin and Denniz Pop. In its initial release, "I Want You Back" peaked at number ten in Germany. After releasing internationally, the song charted at number 13 on the US Billboard Hot 100, and at number five on the UK Singles Chart. Two music videos for "I Want You Back" were released for the song's initial release and global re-release, which were directed by Alan Calzatti, and Jesse Vaughan and Douglas Biro respectively.

== Background and composition ==
"I Want You Back" was written and produced by Max Martin and his then-mentor Denniz Pop. NSYNC were flown over to Stockholm to record the song in 1996. In a 2018 interview with Billboard, band member Joey Fatone described the song as "edgy for pop" and was apprehensive about its reception with listeners. "I Want You Back" was released as a CD single in Germany on October 4, 1996, and eventually in the United States on February 3, 1998. The song was also distributed in the United Kingdom on February 15, 1999. "I Want You Back" was sent out to American CHR stations on December 29, 1997, prior to the song's release as a CD single in the US.

Musically, "I Want You Back" is a dance-pop and pop song. According to the sheet music that was published on Musicnotes.com by Universal Music Publishing Group, the song is set in the time signature of 4/4 common time, with a tempo of 110 beats per minute, while composed in the key of G♯ minor. NSYNC's vocals on the track ranges from the low note of E_{4} to the high note of G♯_{5}, while the song is constructed in verse–chorus form.

== Commercial performance ==
"I Want You Back" peaked in the top 10 in the UK, Germany, Switzerland, New Zealand, and Canada. It peaked at number 13 on the Billboard Hot 100. The song was certified gold in the United States, Germany, and Australia.

== Music videos ==
Two versions of the music video for "I Want You Back" were released: one for the song's original release, and the other for its global re-release. Both versions were included in NSYNC's first video album title *N the Mix: The Official Home Video, released in 1998.

=== Original version ===
The first video depicts the NSYNC members in a space station, with many high-tech effects playing out around them. The video was filmed using a green screen, as each member walked on treadmills. The band attempt to contact a girl through a computer, in order to bring her onto the ship, while they are dancing throughout the video.

=== Alternate version ===
The second video accompanied the British and US release of the song in 1998 and was directed by Jesse Vaughan and Douglas Biro in America. The video was partially shot in grayscale, and depicts NSYNC performing in a warehouse, playing pool, riding jet-skis, and driving around the neighborhood with a girl in a Cadillac. JC Chasez opined that this version was the moment where "we just made a real music video". This version premiered on MTV the week ending February 22, 1998.

== Track listing ==
- German maxi single (1996)
1. "I Want You Back" (Radio Version) – 3:22
2. "I Want You Back" (Long Version) – 4:23
3. "I Want You Back" (Club Version) – 5:24
4. "I Want You Back" (Progressive Dub Mix) – 5:26
- UK & European maxi single (1997)
1. "I Want You Back" (Radio Version) – 3:22
2. "Tearin' Up My Heart" (Radio Version) – 3:26
3. "You Got It" – 3:34
4. "I Want You Back" (Club Version) – 5:24
- UK & European CD single 1 (1998)
1. "I Want You Back" (Radio Version) – 3:22
2. "I Just Wanna Be with You" – 4:02
3. "I Want You Back" (Riprock & Alex G.'s Smooth Vibe Mix) – 4:28
- UK & European CD single 2 (1998)
1. "I Want You Back" (Radio Version) – 3:22
2. "Everything I Own" – 4:10
3. Exclusive interview – 5:06
- US cassette single (1996)
1. "I Want You Back" (Radio Version) – 3:20
2. "Giddy Up" – 4:07
- US maxi single (1998)
1. "I Want You Back" (Hot Tracks Extended Version) – 5:23
2. "I Want You Back" (Riprock's Elevation Mix) – 5:28
3. "I Want You Back" (Florian's Transcontinent Club Mix) – 5:45
4. "I Want You Back" (Riprock & Alex G.'s Smooth Vibe Mix) – 4:27

== Charts ==
=== Weekly charts ===
1996–1997 weekly chart performance for "I Want You Back"
Chart (1996–1997)	Peak position
Austria (Ö3 Austria Top 40)	11
Estonia Airplay (Eesti Top 25)	12
Europe (Eurochart Hot 100)	34
Germany (GfK)	10
Netherlands (Dutch Top 40)	13
Netherlands (Single Top 100)	22
Scottish Singles Sales (Official Charts)	50
Switzerland (Schweizer Hitparade)	5
UK Singles (Official Charts)	62

1998–1999 weekly chart performance for "I Want You Back"
Chart (1998–1999)	Peak position
Australia (ARIA)	11
Canada Top Singles (RPM)	6
Canada (Nielsen SoundScan)	2
Canada Dance/Urban (RPM)	3
Europe (Eurochart Hot 100)	22
Ireland (IRMA)	22
New Zealand (Recorded Music NZ)	5
Scotland (Official Charts Company)	6
Spain Airplay (Top 40 Radio)	38
Sweden (Sverigetopplistan)	14
UK Singles (Official Charts)	5
UK Airplay (Music Week)	43
US Billboard Hot 100	13
US Dance Singles Sales (Billboard)	17
US Pop Airplay (Billboard)	7
US Rhythmic Airplay (Billboard)	22

=== Year-end charts ===
1998 year-end chart performance for "I Want You Back"
Chart (1998)	Position
Canada Top Singles (RPM)	8
US Billboard Hot 100	37

1999 year-end chart performance for "I Want You Back"
Chart (1999)	Position
UK Singles (OCC)	138

== Certifications ==
Certifications and sales for "I Want You Back"
Region	Certification	Certified units/sales
Australia (ARIA)	Gold	35,000^{^}
Canada (Music Canada)	Gold	40,000^{‡}
Germany (BVMI)	Gold	250,000^{^}
New Zealand (RMNZ)	Gold	15,000^{‡}
United Kingdom (BPI)	Silver	200,000^{‡}
United States (RIAA)	Gold	600,000
^{^} Shipments figures based on certification alone.^{‡} Sales+streaming figures based on certification alone.

== Release history ==
Release dates and formats for "I Want You Back"
Region	Date	Format(s)	Label	Ref.
Germany	October 4, 1996	CD single	Sony	
Japan	November 1, 1997	CD single	Ariola Japan	
United Kingdom	November 10, 1997	CD single; cassette single	BMG	
United States	December 29, 1997	Contemporary hit radio; rhythmic contemporary radio	Jive	
United States	February 3, 1998	12-inch vinyl; CD single; Maxi-CD	Jive	
United Kingdom	February 15, 1999	CD single; cassette single	Northwestside	
