= Tearin' Up My Heart =

1997 single by NSYNC

Single by NSYNC

from the album 'N Sync
- B-side: "More Than a Feeling"; "You Got It"; "Crazy for You"
- Released: February 10, 1997
- Recorded: 1996
- Studio: Cheiron (Stockholm, Sweden)
- Genre: Dance-pop; teen pop
- Length: 3:30
- Label: BMG Ariola; RCA
- Songwriters: Max Martin; Kristian Lundin
- Producer: Lundin

NSYNC singles chronology
"I Want You Back" (1996)	"Tearin' Up My Heart" (1997)	"Here We Go" (1997)

Music video
- "Tearin' Up My Heart" on YouTube

"Tearin' Up My Heart" is a song by American boy band NSYNC from their self-titled debut album (1997). The song was written by Max Martin and the producer Kristian Lundin. It was released by BMG Ariola in Germany on February 10, 1997, and by RCA Records in the United States on June 30, 1998, as the second single from the album. A dance-pop and teen pop song, it contains a pop-sounding melody, a strong beat, and a funk-styled pre-verse breakdown, with vocal harmonies performed during the refrain. The lyrics describe the ambiguous future of a romantic relationship.

Upon release, "Tearin' Up My Heart" received mixed reviews from music critics; some praised the production, while other reviewers criticized the vocals and lyrics. Commercially, the song peaked at number four on the German Singles Chart, number nine on the UK Singles Chart, and number 59 on the US Billboard Hot 100. It has been certified platinum by Music Canada and gold by Recorded Music NZ (RMNZ) and the British Phonographic Industry (BPI).

The accompanying music video, directed by Stefan Ruzowitzky, was released in Europe in February 1997 and depicts the NSYNC members performing inside a warehouse. The music video was nominated at the 1999 MTV Video Music Awards for Best Pop Video, Best Group Video, and Viewer's Choice. NSYNC performed "Tearin' Up My Heart" at several concerts and at the 1999 MTV Video Music Awards and the 2019 Coachella Valley Music and Arts Festival, with Britney Spears and Ariana Grande, respectively.

== Background and composition ==
"Tearin' Up My Heart" was originally pitched for the Backstreet Boys to record, but was instead given to NSYNC. It was written by Max Martin and the producer Kristian Lundin in three days after the band's debut single "I Want You Back" started appearing on several European charts. Their German record label, BMG Ariola, wanted the next single to sound similar to "I Want You Back", but catered towards an American audience. "Tearin' Up My Heart" was recorded at Cheiron Studios in 1996. Lundin overslept on the day of the recording and was subsequently awoken by Martin and Denniz Pop. NSYNC arrived in Stockholm the previous night for one day, before being scheduled in Germany the next morning. The song's recording occurred throughout the night until 6 a.m. without any rest breaks, with JC Chasez as the final member to perform the concluding takes. NSYNC were excited about "Tearin' Up My Heart", with Chasez stating that it would help bookend their concerts with "two hit songs". "Tearin' Up My Heart" was released in Germany as a CD single on February 10, 1997. In the United States, the song was only released to contemporary hit radio and rhythmic contemporary radio stations on June 23, 1998. It was released in Australia as NSYNC's second single in March 1999, and in the United Kingdom as a CD and cassette single on June 14, 1999.

Musically, "Tearin' Up My Heart" is a dance-pop and teen pop song, with a pop-sounding melody and a funk-styled pre-verse breakdown. It contains a hook, a "hard-hitting beat", and a refrain with vocal harmonies provided by the NSYNC members. Chasez provides the lead vocals in the song, while Justin Timberlake performs the vocals in the second verse. The lyrics depict the ambiguous future of a romantic relationship, with Chasez stating that they represent "the double-edged sword of love". The song is composed in the key of A minor, and is set in the time signature of 4/4 common time, with a tempo of 110 beats per minute (BPM). NSYNC's vocals span from G_{3} to G_{4}. Simon K. of Sputnikmusic described it as a "great pop track" with "catchy hooks, memorable choruses and great harmonies".

== Critical reception ==
Music critics considered "Tearin' Up My Heart" to be an uptempo song. Quad-City Times staff praised the production for containing "engaging personality" in comparison to other boy bands, but critiqued the lyrics for being "mildly clichéd", and the song for not altering the direction of pop music. Chuck Campbell of Naples Daily News similarly commended the "near-memorable" production and "catchy" refrain of "Tearin' Up My Heart", although he commented that they were used to mask the song's "lack of imagination". Writing for The Indianapolis Star, David Lindquist questioned the production for sounding too similar to late-1980s inspirations such as Rick Astley, and opined that every NSYNC member did not have "an exceptional voice".

VH1 listed "Tearin' Up My Heart" at number 30 on their "100 Greatest Songs of the '90s" listicle in 2007. Writing for Billboard, Taylor Weatherby placed the song at number five on their 2018 listicle of "The 100 Greatest Boy Band Songs of All Time", stating that it contained "higher energy", a "sharper hook", and was "more awe-inspiring" than "I Want You Back". In 2023, Billboard ranked "Tearin' Up My Heart" among the "500 Best Pop Songs of All Time".

== Commercial performance ==
"Tearin' Up My Heart" debuted at number 10 on the German Singles Chart dated February 24, 1997, where it peaked at number four for one week and remained on the chart for 17 weeks. It ranked in at number 30 on the 1997 year-end chart in the country. The song peaked at number four on the Austrian Ö3 Austria Top 40 on April 20, 1997, and subsequently placed at number 33 on the country's year-end chart in 1997. In the Netherlands, "Tearin' Up My Heart" entered at number 56 on the Dutch Single Top 100 chart issued April 12, 1997, where it remained for 10 weeks and peaked at number 31.

"Tearin' Up My Heart" first appeared at number 40 on the UK Singles Chart dated September 13, 1997, and charted for two weeks. On the chart dated June 26, 1999, the song returned to the chart at the number nine peak and remained for 10 weeks. "Tearin' Up My Heart" was certified gold by the British Phonographic Industry (BPI) on February 20, 2026, for sales of over 400,000 equivalent-sales units in the United Kingdom. In Scotland, the song debuted at the number-10 peak on the Scottish Singles Chart dated June 20, 1999. "Tearin' Up My Heart" bowed at number 20 on the Australian ARIA Singles Chart issued April 25, 1999, where it remained for 12 weeks.

Upon its release in the United States, "Tearin' Up My Heart" was ineligible to appear on the Billboard Hot 100 until a rule change was implemented to allow songs without physical releases to chart on December 5, 1998, peaking at number 59 that week. It peaked at number six on the Mainstream Top 40 chart dated September 21, 1998. In Canada, the song peaked at number three on the RPM 100 Hit Tracks chart dated August 16, 1998, and was certified platinum by Music Canada (MC), for track-equivalent sales of 80,000 units in the country.

== Music video ==
An accompanying music video for "Tearin' Up My Heart" was directed by Stefan Ruzowitzky from 1996 to 1997, and filmed in Florida. It was released in Europe in February 1997, and aired in the United States on the debut episode of Total Request Live (TRL) on September 14, 1998. The video depicts the NSYNC members dancing inside a warehouse, playing basketball, and taking photos using a Polaroid camera. They additionally participate in a photo shoot, perform acrobatics, eat pizza, and are sprawled out next to grayscale photographs. Chasez is seen performing with a guitar in one scene. Each member appears in identical black and white outfits. Akron Beacon Journal staff writer Glenn Gamboa described the video as "attractive". The MTV premiere of "Tearin' Up My Heart" in the United States altered a scene from the original European release, which otherwise remained intact. The scene depicted an adolescent female lying next to Timberlake on a bed, with the former digitally erased under orders from NSYNC's record label to maintain their innocent image. The music video was nominated at the 1999 MTV Video Music Awards for Best Pop Video, Best Group Video, and Viewer's Choice.

== Live performances ==
"Tearin' Up My Heart" was included on the encore of the NSYNC in Concert tour, where the NSYNC members were harnessed on wires and performed somersaults, flips, and upside down splits to conclude each concert. Writing for The Dispatch following the Quad Cities concert in 1999, Marc Nesseler opined that the song had "the most enjoyable synchronized dance steps of the night". During the No Strings Attached Tour, a video of a TRL parody segment with MTV video jockey Ananda Lewis was aired, who introduced "Tearin' Up My Heart" as the winner of a pre-determined live fan poll over songs including "Twinkle, Twinkle, Little Star", "Yankee Doodle", and "Three Blind Mice". NSYNC performed "Tearin' Up My Heart" on the PopOdyssey tour as an abridged version, and on the Celebrity Tour with intense choreography.

During MTV's Spring Break coverage on March 19, 1999, NSYNC performed "Tearin' Up My Heart" on the program's "Fashionably Loud" segment. The members wore cargo pants with buttoned shirts, as Timberlake wore a baby blue shirt and Chris Kirkpatrick sported upside-down visors. At the 1999 MTV Video Music Awards, Britney Spears and NSYNC performed together on the same stage, which was their debut appearance at the MTV Video Music Awards (VMAs). Host Chris Rock yelled out, "Are you ready for some real lip-synching?", as he introduced both performers on stage and subsequently surprised music journalists. Spears first performed a remix of "...Baby One More Time" in black leather attire, as NSYNC transitioned into "Tearin' Up My Heart" using the existing classroom setup from the previous performance.

The remaining NSYNC members without Timberlake appeared at the Coachella Valley Music and Arts Festival on April 14, 2019, to perform with headliner Ariana Grande. Both artists teased a collaboration during the afternoon on Twitter before their performance. The members rehearsed for one and a half days, and delivered live vocals at the event. They appeared as Grande's surprise guests to sing the bridge of "Break Up with Your Girlfriend, I'm Bored", which sampled "It Makes Me Ill" from their second studio album No Strings Attached. They then performed "Tearin' Up My Heart", with Grande substituting for Timberlake's vocals in the second verse and simultaneously dancing to the song's choreography. The accompanying video screen resembled a VHS tape with ripples and numbers, as NSYNC's appearance at the event was positively received by the loud crowd. Gab Ginsberg of Billboard opined that Grande's performance of "Tearin' Up My Heart" was a "highlight" from her headlining set.

== In popular culture ==
"Tearin' Up My Heart" was used on NSYNC's episode of Becoming, an MTV program where fans recreate a music video filmed by the original artist. Over 100 people from Southern California physically appeared to audition, while over 200 people across the United States sent in audition tapes. The song was also given to the Massive Monkees on the fourth season of America's Best Dance Crew as part of the VMAs challenge in Week 6. The group intended to show "intensity" in their performance, which was praised by judge Chasez as "one of their best performances".

== Track listings ==
- 1997 German maxi single
- 1997 UK CD single
1. "Tearin' Up My Heart" (Radio Edit) – 3:26
2. "Tearin' Up My Heart" (Extended Version) – 4:45
3. "Tearin' Up My Heart" (Phat Dub) – 6:28
4. "Tearin' Up My Heart" (Phat Swede Instrumental) – 6:44
- 1997 German maxi single – The Remix
1. "Tearin' Up My Heart" (Phat Radio) – 4:07
2. "Tearin' Up My Heart" (Phat Swede Club Mix) – 6:44
3. "Tearin' Up My Heart" (Phat Dub) – 6:28
4. "Tearin' Up My Heart" (Extended Version) – 4:45
5. "Tearin' Up My Heart" (Radio Edit) – 3:26
- 1997 German limited edition heart shaped CD
1. "Tearin' Up My Heart" (Radio Edit) – 3:26
2. "Tearin' Up My Heart" (Extended Version) – 4:45
- 1997 UK and Ireland CD digipak
1. "Tearin' Up My Heart" (Radio Edit) – 3:26
2. "Tearin' Up My Heart" (Phat Swede Club Mix) – 6:44
3. "More Than a Feeling" – 3:44
- 1998 UK and Europe CD1 poster pack
1. "Tearin' Up My Heart" (Beat Back Radio Edit) – 3:29
2. "You Got It" – 3:33
3. "Tearin' Up My Heart" (Riprock & Alex G's Heart Edit) – 3:52
- 1998 UK and Europe CD2
1. "Tearin' Up My Heart" (Original Version) – 3:31
2. "Crazy for You" – 3:41
3. Exclusive interview – 10:48
- 1998 Australian CD single
1. "Tearin' Up My Heart" (Original Version) – 3:30
2. "Tearin' Up My Heart" (Beat Back Radio Edit) – 3:28
3. "Tearin' Up My Heart" (Riprock and Alex G's Heart & Key Edit) – 3:51
4. "Tearin' Up My Heart" (JJ Flores Main Level Edit) – 3:52

== Credits and personnel ==
Credits are adapted from the back cover of "Tearin' Up My Heart".

Recording

- Recorded at Cheiron Studios, Stockholm, Sweden
- Produced for Cheiron Productions, 1996

Personnel

- Kristian Lundin – music, lyrics, production
- Max Martin – music, lyrics
- Moritz Teichmann – photography

== Charts ==
=== Weekly charts ===
1997–1998 weekly chart performance
Chart (1997–1998)	Peak position
Austria (Ö3 Austria Top 40)	4
Canada Top Singles (RPM)	3
Canada Dance/Urban (RPM)	3
Estonia (Eesti Top 20)	3
Estonia Airplay (Eesti Top 25)	2
Europe (Eurochart Hot 100)	19
Europe (European Hit Radio)	36
Germany (GfK)	4
Israel (Israeli Singles Chart)	1
Netherlands (Dutch Top 40)	28
Netherlands (Single Top 100)	31
New Zealand (Recorded Music NZ)	19
Switzerland (Schweizer Hitparade)	6
Scottish Singles Sales (Official Charts)	37
Spain Airplay (Top 40 Radio)	30
UK Singles (Official Charts)	40
US Billboard Hot 100	59
US Adult Pop Airplay (Billboard)	39
US Pop Airplay (Billboard)	6
US Radio Songs (Billboard)	15
US Rhythmic Airplay (Billboard)	19

1999 weekly chart performance
Chart (1999)	Peak position
Australia (ARIA)	20
Europe (Eurochart Hot 100)	45
Ireland (IRMA)	18
Scottish Singles Sales (Official Charts)	10
UK Singles (Official Charts)	9
UK Airplay (Music Week)	39

=== Year-end charts ===
1997 year-end chart performance
Chart (1997)	Position
Austria (Ö3 Austria Top 40)	33
Europe (Eurochart Hot 100)	86
Germany (Media Control)	30
Israel (Israeli Singles Chart)	13
Romania (Romanian Top 100)	30

1999 year-end chart performance
Chart (1999)	Position
UK Singles (OCC)	159

== Certifications ==
Certifications
Region	Certification	Certified units/sales
Canada (Music Canada)	Platinum	80,000^{‡}
New Zealand (RMNZ)	Gold	15,000^{‡}
United Kingdom (BPI)	Gold	400,000^{‡}
^{‡} Sales+streaming figures based on certification alone.

== Release history ==
Release dates and formats
Region	Date	Format	Label	Ref.
Germany	February 10, 1997	CD single	Sony	
United Kingdom	August 25, 1997	CD single	BMG	
United States	June 23, 1998	Contemporary hit radio; rhythmic contemporary radio	RCA	
United Kingdom	June 14, 1999	CD single; cassette single	Northwestside	
