= NSYNC =

American boy band

- NSYNC in 1999; Clockwise from top left: Joey Fatone, Chris Kirkpatrick, Lance Bass, Justin Timberlake, and JC Chasez

Background information
- Origin: Orlando, Florida, U.S.
- Genres: Pop; dance-pop; teen pop; R&B
- Years active: 1995–2004; 2013; 2019; 2023–2024
- Labels: Trans Continental; Ariola; RCA; Jive/Zomba
- Past members: Justin Timberlake; JC Chasez; Chris Kirkpatrick; Joey Fatone; Jason Galasso; Lance Bass
- Website: nsync.com

NSYNC (/ɛnˈsɪŋk, ɪn-/ en-SINK, in-; also stylized as *NSYNC or 'N Sync) was an American vocal group and pop boy band formed by Chris Kirkpatrick in Orlando, Florida, in 1995 and launched in Germany by BMG Ariola Munich. The group consisted of Kirkpatrick, JC Chasez, Joey Fatone, Justin Timberlake, and Lance Bass. Their debut album NSYNC was successfully released to European countries in 1997 and later entered the American market with the single "I Want You Back".

After heavily publicized legal battles with their former manager Lou Pearlman and former record label Bertelsmann Music Group, the group's third album, No Strings Attached (2000), sold over 1 million copies in one day and 2.4 million copies in one week in the US, which was a record for over fifteen years. Celebrity (2001) debuted with 1.8 million copies in its first week in the US. Singles such as "Girlfriend", "Pop", "Bye Bye Bye", "Tearin' Up My Heart", and "It's Gonna Be Me" reached the Top 10 in several international charts, with the last hitting number 1 on the US Billboard Hot 100.

The group went on an indefinite hiatus in 2002. (Note: Though never officially announcing a breakup, the group went on an indefinite hiatus in 2002 after completing their Celebrity tour; band member Lance Bass confirmed years later in his 2007 memoir Out of Sync that the band had quietly split for good in 2002. In November 2024, JC Chasez confirmed that there were no further plans for the group.) Over the course of their hiatus, the five members reunited occasionally, including for a one-off performance at the 2013 MTV Video Music Awards, for an appearance on The Ellen DeGeneres Show in 2018, and to receive a star on the Hollywood Walk of Fame in 2018. They reunited as a four piece without Timberlake to perform with Ariana Grande at Coachella in 2019. The group briefly reunited in 2023 to release the song "Better Place" for the DreamWorks animated film Trolls Band Together (which stars Timberlake) and performed at the premiere, and at the 2023 MTV Video Music Awards. While working on "Better Place", NSYNC also recorded a track titled "Paradise" for Timberlake's sixth solo album, Everything I Thought It Was (2024). In 2024, the group made a special one-off appearance at Timberlake's ONO concert in Los Angeles.

The band completed five nationwide concert tours and has sold over 70 million records, becoming one of the best-selling boy bands of all time. Rolling Stone recognized their instant success as one of the Top 25 Teen Idol Breakout Moments of all time. In addition to nine Grammy Award nominations, NSYNC performed at the Super Bowl and sang the national anthem at the Olympic Games and World Series. They have also sung or recorded with Elton John, Stevie Wonder, Michael and Janet Jackson, Britney Spears, Phil Collins, Celine Dion, Aerosmith, Nelly, Lisa "Left Eye" Lopes, Mary J. Blige, Alabama, and Gloria Estefan.

== History ==
=== 1995–1997: Formation and debut ===
NSYNC's wordmark logo

In 1995, while working at Universal Studios and singing in the Hollywood Hi-Tones, Chris Kirkpatrick was introduced to Lou Pearlman, who had created the Backstreet Boys, through a mutual friend who had heard that Pearlman was interested in financing another vocal group. Originally, when the Backstreet Boys formed, Kirkpatrick had not known about their auditions, so he never got the chance to try out. When Pearlman met him and saw him perform in his doo-wop group, Pearlman took an interest in him, so they discussed the idea of Kirkpatrick forming a vocal group, which Pearlman promised to finance if Kirkpatrick could find other singers to join him. Kirkpatrick took the opportunity and spent over a year trying to find other people to join him, eventually finding Justin Timberlake (who had been on the TV show The All New Mickey Mouse Club along with JC Chasez) through a talent agent and contacting him in regards to the group.

After the end of The All New Mickey Mouse Club, JC Chasez attempted to pursue a solo music career in Los Angeles, but decided to return home to Maryland after he was left feeling cheated. On his drive back, he stopped at Timberlake's house in Memphis, Tennessee, where the two wrote demos together. Chasez and Timberlake eventually relocated to Nashville while continuously writing songs and demo tracks with Robin Wiley, a songwriter and vocal coach on The All New Mickey Mouse Club. After Timberlake received a phone call from Kirkpatrick, he decided to join the group, recommending Chasez in the process, who was back home in Maryland saving up to return to Nashville. The trio decided to venture in Orlando, Florida, to search for a baritone, where they encountered Joey Fatone, who knew Kirkpatrick from their time working together at Universal Studios Florida and also knew Timberlake and Chasez from being in the same friend groups when they were on The All New Mickey Mouse Club. Charles Edward, who had been fired after a short time with the Backstreet Boys, was tried as the group's bass singer; he soon left to get married. The group recruited Jason Galasso as their bass singer. NSYNC created their name after Timberlake's mother Lynn commented on how "in sync" the group's singing voices were. The group's name is a play on the last letter of each of the initial members' names: Justin, Chris, Joey, Jason, and JC.

After several weeks of rehearsals, the group set up a showcase and began planning to officially sign with Pearlman's Trans Continental Label. However, at the last minute, Galasso dropped out. He was not fond of the group's musical direction, claiming that being a teen idol was never a goal of his. To help him in deciding between joining the R&B project Unreal and the pop project NSYNC, Galasso had his lawyer compare the two contracts presented by the groups, concluding that Unreal's was industry standard, while Pearlman's NSYNC contract was far too large and overly complicated. Galasso joined Unreal instead, but that project never gained traction. Still in need of a bass, Timberlake eventually called his vocal coach, who suggested a 16-year-old from Mississippi named Lance Bass. Bass flew to Orlando to audition and was immediately accepted into the group. He was nicknamed "Lansten" so they could keep the name 'NSYNC. From there, Pearlman set the five boys up in a house in Orlando, Florida, where they rehearsed constantly, learning dance routines and vocal parts, and worked on promotion for their first public performance at Pleasure Island on October 22, 1995. Pearlman hired Johnny Wright to manage the group, despite also managing the Backstreet Boys. NSYNC sent him a four-song demo-tape including "I'll Be Back for More" and "We Can Work It Out", which impressed him. The group performed for him and a group of BMG executives. Although the record company had some concerns with the band's name and Lance Bass's dancing abilities (which eventually improved), they agreed to sign the group to BMG Ariola Munich with Wright as their manager.

After being signed to BMG Ariola Munich, the group was sent to Sweden to begin working on their first album with the help of producers Denniz Pop, Max Martin and Andreas Carlsson. The album's official lead single, "I Want You Back", was released in Germany on October 7, 1996, and entered the Top 10 in Germany on November 18, 1996. With a record deal finally secured, the boys began touring first in German-speaking countries and later in other European and Asian territories. Their first album NSYNC was initially released by BMG Ariola Munich on May 26, 1997, in Germany, and peaked at number 1 in the second week after its release. The group became an overnight success throughout much of Europe. The album also charted successfully in both Switzerland and Austria eventually selling 820,000 units in Germany, Switzerland and Austria (GSA), and Eastern Europe. The group released its second and third singles, "Tearin' Up My Heart" and "Here We Go", both of which managed to reach the top 10 in numerous countries in Europe. Next, they released two Germany-only singles, "For the Girl Who Has Everything" and "Together Again".

=== 1998–1999: Breaking into the American market and legal battle against Pearlman ===
NSYNC captured the attention of Vincent DeGiorgio, an A&R rep for RCA Records. After seeing the group perform in Budapest, he eventually signed them to RCA in 1998. The American label had the group record some new tracks to adjust their album for the US market. The group released its debut American single, "I Want You Back" on December 29, 1997. It reached number 13 on the Billboard Hot 100. An album called 'N Sync followed on March 24, 1998. Album sales were sluggish, debuting at number 82 on the Billboard 200, but were helped when the Disney Channel aired a concert special on July 18, 1998. The concert was first offered to the Backstreet Boys, but they had to back out due to member Brian Littrell needing heart surgery, later doing their own special in 1999. Five weeks before the concert, the album sat at number 82 on the albums chart; three weeks after the concert, the album reached number 9. The group's profile continued to rise with the subsequent single release "Tearin' Up My Heart", which became a hit on pop radio and one of the "100 Greatest Songs of the 90s" according to VH1. Regular touring, including an opening spot on Janet Jackson's The Velvet Rope Tour, and television spots on shows like Sabrina the Teenage Witch also bolstered sales for the album, which was eventually certified diamond for shipments in excess of 10 million units.

On November 10, 1998, the group released a holiday album, Home for Christmas. The album peaked at number 7 and sold two million copies. With this, NSYNC achieved the rare feat of having two albums in the Billboard Top 10 at the same time. A week later on November 16, 1998, NSYNC released The Winter Album in Germany. One of the songs on the album "U Drive Me Crazy" was a major hit in Spain peaking at number 4. The group scored its first top 10 on the Hot 100 with their third single, "(God Must Have Spent) A Little More Time on You", which peaked at number 8 in February 1999. Country group Alabama later re-recorded the song and released it as a single that featured vocals from NSYNC. The fourth and final single from the album, "I Drive Myself Crazy", was a modest chart hit, but a mainstay on Total Request Live. NSYNC also recorded their version of the song "Trashin' The Camp" with Phil Collins. The song appears on the soundtrack to the Disney movie Tarzan. They also did "Somewhere, Someday" which appears on the soundtrack to Pokémon: The First Movie. In September 1999, the group collaborated with Gloria Estefan on a song for the soundtrack for her movie Music of the Heart. The track "Music of My Heart" reached number 2 on the Hot 100 and served as a stopgap between album releases.

In 1999, NSYNC entered a publicized legal battle with Lou Pearlman, due to what the group believed were illicit business practices on his part. NSYNC sued Pearlman and his record company, Trans Continental, for defrauding the group of more than fifty percent of their earnings, rather than his promise of only receiving one-sixth of the profits, similar to his promise of one-sixth of the profits with the Backstreet Boys. The group threatened to leave and sign with Jive Records, which prompted Pearlman and RCA to countersue NSYNC for US$150 million. Trans Continental, along with RCA's parent BMG Entertainment, went to federal court and filed said $150 million suit in an effort to stop NSYNC's move to Jive, to prevent the band from performing or recording under the name NSYNC, and to force NSYNC to return masters recorded that year in preparation of their second album (originally scheduled for release that fall by RCA, the album was then moved to early 2000). The suit also claims Jive executives induced the group into breaking its Trans Continental contract. Pearlman's request for a preliminary injunction against the band was denied. In December 1999, NSYNC and Pearlman reached an undisclosed settlement out of court, freeing the group to release future albums on Jive Records.

Also in 1999, NSYNC starred in a short-form spoof video of the 1998 science fiction disaster film Armageddon for the 1999 MTV Movie & TV Awards; it was titled Armagedd'NSync. It featured an earthbound asterisk-shaped asteroid (a play off the asterisk they usually had in their name at the time) and featured Clint Howard, Lisa Kudrow, and all five members of NSYNC.

=== 2000–2001: No Strings Attached and groundbreaking success ===
With their legal woes behind them, NSYNC refocused and worked on tracks for its second album. In January 2000, the group released "Bye Bye Bye", an upbeat dance track, which shot into the Top 10 of the Hot 100 and spent five weeks atop the Hot 100 Airplay chart. The song is often considered the group's signature song. The accompanying album, No Strings Attached, was released on March 21, 2000. It sold a record 2.42 million in its first week of release. By the end of 2000, it had sold over 9.9 million copies. No Strings Attached was the best-selling album of 2000, and the second-best selling album of the decade in the US behind the Beatles' 1. As of August 2012, No Strings Attached was the eighth best selling album of the SoundScan era, and received a Diamond certification from RIAA for sales of over 11,099,000. The album was all-time bestselling pre-ordered album on Amazon.com.

The second single, "It's Gonna Be Me", became the group's first number 1 single in the U.S. and remained at the top position on the Billboard Hot 100 from July 29 to August 11, 2000. The third and final single, "This I Promise You" reached the top five on the Billboard Hot 100 chart. They performed the Spanish version of the song, "Yo Te Voy a Amar", at the Latin Grammys in 2001. The group also embarked on their No Strings Attached Tour that year. The adventures of preparing for the tour were featured on an MTV special "Making the Tour", which was later released on DVD. The tour was then featured on a HBO special, which aired the same week the group's song "It's Gonna Be Me" hit number 1 on the charts. The group then went on the second leg of the tour in the fall and performed one last show in 2001 for the "Rock in Rio" concert. The group also released Live From Madison Square Garden, a home video release of its HBO Special. NSYNC and Aerosmith co-headlined the Super Bowl XXXV halftime show, titled "The Kings of Rock and Pop", with appearances from Britney Spears, Mary J. Blige and Nelly. NSYNC was among the artists that performed at the 2002 Winter Olympics ceremonies.

=== 2001–2007: Celebrity, hiatus, Timberlake's exit and breakup announcement ===
No Strings firmly established *NSYNC as the Godzillas of the Pop2K era... The limelight would shine brightly until the following year, when the group released their final album, Celebrity, another smash. That one proved to be the group's swan song, setting the stage for Timberlake's equally massive solo career—and signaling the last, platinum gasp of a time when buying music meant spending your actual paper allowance rather than clicking a link on your iPhone.

— Billboard's "The Greatest Pop Star By Year (1981–2020)". 2000: NSYNC.

The group's fourth album, Celebrity, was released on July 24, 2001, and produced three singles: "Pop" (number 19 in the US), "Gone" (number 11) and "Girlfriend" (number 5). The album marked a greater level of creative involvement from the group, with members contributing to the writing and production of several tracks.

Celebrity sold 1,879,955 copies in its first week, making it the second-fastest-selling album in SoundScan history at the time, only behind the group's previous album No Strings Attached. Its debut was recognized by the Billboard Music Awards with a special award for "biggest one-week sales for an album in 2001." To promote the Celebrity album, the group embarked on a four-month stadium tour entitled the PopOdyssey Tour. The tour earned over $90 million, becoming one of the biggest tours of 2001. In 2002, the band promoted their album further by embarking on the Celebrity Tour, which earned nearly $30 million.

Following the tour, the group went on an indefinite hiatus to allow for time off and at the suggestion of Timberlake, who was interested in recording a solo album. While the hiatus was initially meant to be temporary, the group never toured together again. "It started as a fun snowball fight that was becoming an avalanche. And, also, I was growing out of it. I felt like I cared more about the music than some of the other people in the group. And I felt like I had other music I wanted to make and that I needed to follow my heart," Timberlake later said of his decision to leave the band.

Joey Fatone, Lance Bass, and Chris Kirkpatrick have offered a different perspective on NSYNC's split, indicating that a lack of transparency left them unprepared for the prospect of a breakup. In a 2019 interview on The Jenny McCarthy Show, Fatone said the group believed they would be reuniting because they were young and "didn't know better at first." He then went on to say that the momentum of the Justified album and tour was the reason for prolonging a group reunion that would result in new music. Recalling a conversation he'd had with his bandmates, Fatone elaborated: "I said, 'Listen, I'm all good with everybody doing their own shit. I'm totally fine with it, just let us know next time.' Meaning: I could've done a lot more shit than sit around waiting for your dumb ass while you're going out on tour. I could've, honestly. 'Cause the minute we parted our ways in the sense of a group I was like, shit, I went and did Broadway—I did Rent on Broadway, I did Little Shop of Horrors ... I was just like 'Dude, just let me know next time,' I said. 'Cause next time I ain't waiting for nobody."

Lance Bass has addressed the breakup on multiple occasions over the years, beginning with comments made shortly after Timberlake's departure and continuing in his memoir and later interviews. In September 2004, Bass told Fox News columnist Roger Friedman that new music from NSYNC "all depends on whether Justin wants to do it, and he doesn't." Several years later, while promoting his memoir, Bass told the Orlando Sentinel that the group was "definitely broken up" rather than on hiatus, adding that Timberlake "made it clear that he wouldn't be interested in discussing another album any time soon." Bass later reflected on the entire period following the group's 2002 hiatus in his memoir, where he described passing up various professional opportunities while waiting for the group to reunite, and again in a 2020s interview on Michael Rosenbaum's Inside of You podcast. In that interview, Bass explained, "Me and the guys were never on bad terms at all, you know, it's just life goes on and you know you have more interests; you have to focus on your career and it's great. The thing I was most disappointed in was not just Justin leaving the band, it's that our whole team—our record label, our management, everything like that—they all knew. They all knew it was over for three years before they told me. And so for three years I'm sitting there getting ready for a new album as everyone else knows we're moving on ... there was a sitcom I was doin'. Had to turn it down ... all kinds of stuff that I really wanted to do and focus on but I knew I couldn't because, you know, my first commitment is NSYNC. Like, this is my life."

In the Paramount+ documentary Larger Than Life: Reign of the Boybands, Chris Kirkpatrick described the hiatus period as "hard," recalling "a lot of animosity," "anger," and "resentment," and said he wondered whether the group would ever reunite, according to Entertainment Weekly. Lance Bass echoed similar reflections in the same documentary, stating that the record label told the group to "come back in six months" to begin work on their next album, but that "it just never happened" and the group ultimately "never got back together."

The group still attended award shows and events together, and regrouped at the 45th Annual Grammy Awards to sing a televised Bee Gees medley in tribute to that band. They were slated to begin work on a new album in the fall of 2003, but it never materialized. They performed "The Star-Spangled Banner" at the 2004 NSYNC Challenge for the Children. According to Bass' 2007 memoir Out of Sync, written after Bass won the Human Rights Campaign Award for his work in the gay community after his coming out, a meeting was held in the summer of 2004 to discuss the band's future where Timberlake announced his decision to leave the band.

In 2005, NSYNC regrouped for the last Challenge for the Children but did not perform. In the fall of 2005, NSYNC released a greatest hits album. It included one song, "I'll Never Stop", that had previously not been released in the US. In 2007, while promoting Out of Sync, Bass confirmed the group's breakup to the press.

=== 2010–present: Occasional appearances, Walk of Fame, "Better Place" and second hiatus ===
In January 2010, the band released another album, The Collection, consisting of singles released only in the UK. On August 25, 2013, the members of NSYNC regrouped for a one-off performance at the 2013 MTV Video Music Awards. They performed a medley of "Girlfriend" and "Bye Bye Bye" during Timberlake's 15-minute set leading up to his acceptance of the Michael Jackson Video Vanguard Award. Their introduction included vocal elements of "Gone" in the background. After the performance, Bass said that the group did not have any plans at the moment for a reunion tour or new music.

On July 29, 2014, a compilation of NSYNC's hits and unreleased songs titled The Essential *NSYNC, was released. Bass said of the album on his radio show, Dirty Pop: "There's a lot of these songs I don't think I've ever heard, I remember recording them but I've never heard them before, so I'm interested in just hearing them." Chasez tweeted about the album's release, stating: "I had the strangest dream last night that some old friends and I had a top 10 record on iTunes. Crazy right..." Kirkpatrick said of the album; "It's great to release some of the songs that had never made a record before. I'm glad our long time fans get some new music." Fatone also said; "Pretty interesting this album comes out, which I really had no idea, and it's in the top of Amazon and iTunes... we owe it to our fans. Thank you." Fatone and Kirkpatrick starred in Dead 7, a western zombie film written by Backstreet Boys member Nick Carter. The film premiered on April 1, 2016, on the Syfy channel.

On April 30, 2018, NSYNC reunited to receive a star on the Hollywood Walk of Fame. To celebrate the occasion, all five members appeared on The Ellen DeGeneres Show. On April 14, 2019, Chasez, Fatone, Bass, and Kirkpatrick reunited, for a performance with Ariana Grande during her headlining performance at Coachella. They performed "Break Up with Your Girlfriend, I'm Bored", "It Makes Me Ill" and "Tearin' Up My Heart". Timberlake was unable to make the reunion due to finishing up his The Man of the Woods Tour the night before. On April 19, 2021, Bass, Fatone, and Kirkpatrick reunited for a Progressive Insurance commercial known as "The 3/5ths of NSYNC".

On September 12, 2023, following weeks of teasers and speculation regarding a potential reunion, all five members appeared together at the 2023 MTV Video Music Awards to present the Best Pop Award. On September 14, it was confirmed the group recorded a new song titled "Better Place" for the DreamWorks Animation film Trolls Band Together. The song was released on September 29, 2023, reaching No. 1 on the US and Canadian iTunes Charts, No. 4 on the Global and European iTunes Charts and No. 25 on the Billboard Hot 100. To further promote the single, the band appeared together on a 2023 episode of the YouTube talk show Hot Ones.

In the wake of the release of "Better Place", Joey Fatone said that, depending on the success of new music from the band and the continued involvement of Timberlake, they could record a new album together within the next two years. On March 13, 2024, NSYNC performed together for the first time since the 2013 MTV Video Music Awards at Timberlake's One Night Only (ONO) concert at The Wiltern in Los Angeles. They performed "Girlfriend", "Bye Bye Bye", and "It's Gonna Be Me" and debuted their new song, "Paradise", which was released two days later as a track on Timberlake's sixth studio album, Everything I Thought It Was. The same year, "Bye Bye Bye" resurged in popularity after it was featured in the 2024 Marvel Cinematic Universe film Deadpool & Wolverine.

Regarding the band's future, Chasez made a statement during a podcast appearance in November 2024, stating: "Right now everybody's focused on different projects. But we're always talking in the background, and it only takes like one idea to pop, so anything's possible."

== Artistry ==
Their debut studio album NSYNC (1997) featured four-on-the-floor Europop beats with midtempo singles "I Want You Back" and "Tearin' Up My Heart", that recalled a production similar to Ace of Base. No Strings Attached (2000) was noted as "an incremental step away" from teen pop's "softer side", as it featured ballads written by 80s adult contemporary singer Richard Marx and prolific songwriter Diane Warren. Primarily a pop album, it comprised a blend of new jack swing revivalism, uptempo R&B and hip-hop influences. Lyrically, the lead single "Bye Bye Bye"'s kiss-off message and self-assurance saw the group departing from the "lovesick" formula of their debut. Celebrity (2001) was mainly a pop/R&B record with electronica elements.

== Marketing ==
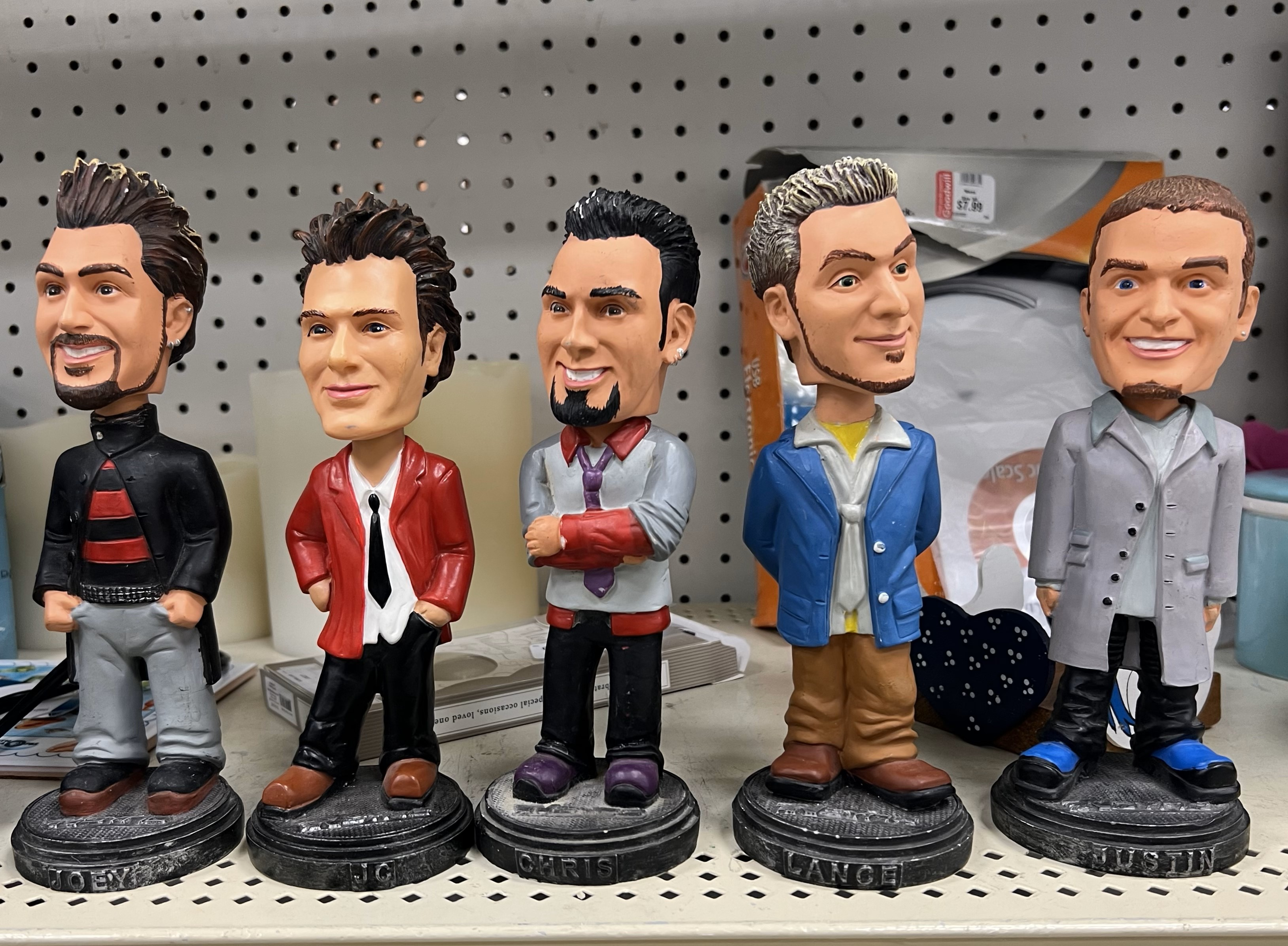
NSYNC bobblehead memorabilia

The members licensed their likenesses on a great variety of merchandise, including board games, microphones, lip balm, marionettes, books, key chains, bedding, clothing, video games, and various other articles. The group was immortalized in wax in Madame Tussauds New York wax museum in 2002; all five members of NSYNC were present the day of the unveiling. The group also had a deal alongside McDonald's, which included commercials featuring the group and Britney Spears, along with a CD and a video that featured behind-the-scenes footage from the making of NSYNC's music video. The vocal group also had a deal with Chili's Grill & Bar in which the members appeared in commercials for the restaurant, while Chili's helped sponsor the group's tour. Video games based on the band were released by Infogrames in 2001, namely the Game Boy Color minigame compilation titled *NSYNC: Get to the Show and an activity center for young girls entitled NSYNC Hotline Fantasy Phone and CD-ROM Game, whose main selling point is a toy cellphone peripheral where players can "receive" voice and text messages from the band. In April 2018, a free, limited-run shop called "Dirty Pop-Up" centered in NSYNC opened on Hollywood Boulevard, Los Angeles.

== Legacy ==
Entertainment Weekly ranked NSYNC as the best boy band of the 1990s and 2000s; editor Madelne Boardman stated, "the group has a spot in pop history more than a decade late." The Washington Post stated it was one of the two boy bands "that dominated the late '90s and early '00s." According to Billboard, No Strings Attached was the top album of the 2000s (decade), with The Independent listing it among the albums "that marked the decade." Billboard also ranked the group at number four on their list of the biggest boy bands (from the period 1987–2012) according to chart performance, with the staff writing, "despite having one of the most short-lived boy band careers, 'N Sync was arguably the most famous."

In a retrospective article for No Strings Attached's 20th anniversary, NPR's writer Maria Sherman said the album marked "the sound of a new millennium" and an "industry peak" commercially, while describing the group as "one of the last artists to benefit so greatly from the industry bubble before its spectacular burst," referring to the following post-9/11 era. Sherman also noted their sophomore album to be relevant to the pop market of 2020: "a union of Swedish pop songcraft with R&B and hip-hop's flow and bounce; an eagerness to explore mature themes and styles; an understanding that dance and visual presentation can turn stars into icons." Billboard stated that their sophomore album's production and writing "represented a sonic shift for all of pop music at the turn of the millennium," while noting, "before No Strings Attached, none of the major teen pop albums of the era had featured guest rappers or name producers from the R&B world, and virtually every one that came after did." Writer Al Shipley commented that although NSYNC was not the first act to build an album "around the theme of taking control of their career", the group took this theme a step further with the No Strings Attached cover art and the "Bye Bye Bye" music video. Shipley further stated the album's pop, hip hop, and R&B elements helped NSYNC "climb to the top of the boy band heap."

A Stereogum article noted the group "were deeply ingrained within the TRL universe", the MTV fan-voted video countdown where they had the most number-one videos for a group and second-most overall, which became "ground zero" for "America's adolescent culture war." The website's editor commented, "to be a teenager at the turn of the millennium was to be inundated with boy bands and pop princesses, and *NSYNC were among the most dominant of them all." As NSYNC propelled the solo stardom of Timberlake, Consequence noted, "[his] solo success is the exception, not the rule", as other contemporary boy bands "failed to produce a solo star." Several acts have cited the group as an influence, including Kelsea Ballerini, Selena Gomez, Meghan Trainor, and Why Don't We. Hayley Williams stated she learned harmonies through listening to the group in her teenage years. Taylor Swift called the band "pop personified" upon accepting the Best Pop Award from the group at the 2023 MTV Video Music Awards.

== Awards and nominations ==
NSYNC has been nominated for nine Grammy Awards. Among their awards, the group has won three American Music Awards, five Billboard Music Awards, seven MTV Video Music Awards, and they held the Guinness World Record for the "Fastest-selling pop album in US History" from 2000 to 2015. NSYNC has the record second fastest-selling album in the USA and the fifth-fastest-selling album worldwide. NSYNC received a Grammy Award nomination at the 2025 Grammy Awards in Best Song Written for Visual Media for the song "Better Place".

== Former band members ==
- JC Chasez – melody/1st tenor (1995–2002; 2023–2024)
- Justin Timberlake – melody/2nd tenor (1995–2002; 2023–2024)
- Chris Kirkpatrick – countertenor (1995–2002; 2023–2024)
- Joey Fatone – baritone (1995–2002; 2023–2024)
- Lance Bass – bass (1995–2002; 2023–2024)

== Discography ==
=== Studio albums ===
- NSYNC (1997)
- Home for Christmas (1998)
- No Strings Attached (2000)
- Celebrity (2001)

== Filmography ==
=== Concert films ===
- NSYNC: Live from Madison Square Garden (2000) (Legacy Studio Recordings)
- NSYNC: Bigger Than Live (2001)
- NSYNC: Pop Odyssey Live (2002)

=== Documentaries ===
- NSYNC: N the Mix (The Official Home Video) (1998) (RCA Records) (Also: NSYNC: N the Mix (The Official Home DVD) (1999) (RCA Records))
- NSYNC: Making the Tour (2000) (Jive)
- The Reel NSYNC (2002) (Trauma Records)
- NSYNC's Challenge for the Children: Daze vs Knights (2003)

=== Compilation ===
- NSYNC: Most Requested Hit Videos (2002) (Sony Legacy)

=== Movies (fiction) ===
- Longshot (2001)
- On the Line (2001) (Joey Fatone, Lance Bass, Chris Kirkpatrick, and Justin Timberlake)
- Trolls Band Together (2023)

=== TV specials ===
- NSYNC in Concert (1998); filmed at Disney's Hollywood Studios at Walt Disney World for Disney Channel in Concert.
- Holidays in Concert (1998); performed songs from Home for Christmas as well as "(God Must Have Spent) A Little More Time on You" from their debut album.
- NSYNC 'N Concert (1999); pay-per-view concert filmed in Fort Lauderdale, Florida during NSYNC's Ain't No Stoppin' Us Now Tour.
- Walt Disney World Summer Jam Concert (1999); performed along with Britney Spears, Tyrese Gibson and 98 Degrees.
- NSYNC: Live from Madison Square Garden (2000); a concert special presented by HBO during the No Strings Attached Tour.
- Walt Disney World Twas the Night Before Christmas (2000); performed along with 98 Degrees, Monica, Jessica Simpson, Billy Gilman and many others.
- NSYNC Ntimate Holiday Special (2000); a Christmas special on FOX where NSYNC sang songs from No Strings Attached plus "You Don't Have To Be Alone" from the soundtrack to the film How the Grinch Stole Christmas and "O Holy Night" from their album Home for Christmas.
- NSYNC: The Road to Celebrity (2001); an MTV special from San Diego, California where NSYNC sang and previewed songs from their third album Celebrity. The special also included a countdown of the best NSYNC moments on MTV.
- *NSYNC: Live from Atlantis (2001); a Thanksgiving concert special on CBS filmed from Atlantis Paradise Island which aired before an airing of The Rugrats Movie & included duets with & a performance from special guest Tim McGraw.

=== Guest appearances on TV shows ===
- 1998 Miss Teen USA (1998) Tearin' Up My Heart was performed.
- Sabrina the Teenage Witch (1998) Episode: "Sabrina and the Pirates"
- Clueless (1999) Episode: "None for the Road"

Note: "Tearin' Up My Heart" was performed in those shows.

- Touched by an Angel (1999) Episode: "Voice of an Angel" (Also sang an a cappella version of "(God Must Have Spent) A Little More Time on You")
- Sesame Street (2000) Episode: "Elmo in Numberland". Sang a song called "Believe in Yourself"
- Saturday Night Live (2000) Episode: Joshua Jackson/NSYNC. As guest performers and in sketches including as fake boy band No Refund
- The Simpsons (2001) Episode: "New Kids on the Blecch" Season 12 Episode 14

== Tours ==
Headlining

- For the Girl Tour (1997)
- NSYNC in Concert (1998–2000)
- No Strings Attached Tour (2000)
- PopOdyssey Tour (2001)
- Celebrity Tour (2002)

As opening (supporting) act

- The Velvet Rope Tour (supporting Janet Jackson) (1998)

== See also ==
- List of artists who reached number one on the Hot 100 (U.S.)
- List of best-selling music artists in the United States

== Bibliography ==
- Bass, Lance; Eliot, Marc (2007). Out of Sync. New York: Simon & Schuster. ISBN 978-1-4169-4788-2. OCLC 154308977.
