= (God Must Have Spent) A Little More Time on You =

1998 single by NSYNC

Single by NSYNC

from the album 'N Sync
- B-side: "Sailing" (live)
- Released: October 27, 1998
- Length: 4:43 (album version); 4:04 (radio version)
- Label: RCA
- Songwriters: Carl Sturken; Evan Rogers
- Producers: Carl Sturken; Evan Rogers

NSYNC singles chronology
"U Drive Me Crazy" (1998)	"(God Must Have Spent) A Little More Time on You" (1998)	"Merry Christmas, Happy Holidays" (1998)

Music video
- "(God Must Have Spent) A Little More Time on You" on YouTube

"(God Must Have Spent) A Little More Time on You" is a song by American boy band NSYNC. It was released as the third single from their self-titled debut album in the United States. While some of the previous singles were released in Europe, this one was not, and it subsequently charted in Australia, Canada, and the US. The single includes a live version of Christopher Cross song "Sailing", as well as a limited-edition postcard. Some versions of the single include the track's video. The radio version of this song was included on both NSYNC's first and third compilation albums: Greatest Hits (2005) and The Essential *NSYNC (2014).

== Music video ==
The video was directed by Lionel C. Martin. The video shows the band performing around one single microphone, while showing footage of the mother and son, from birth to old age, including childhood memories, going to serve in World War II, and coming home. All the footage of the mother and son was in black and white, whereas most of the footage of NSYNC is in full color.

== Track listings ==
US CD maxi-single

1. "(God Must Have Spent) A Little More Time on You" (remix)
2. "Sailing" (live version)
3. "(God Must Have Spent) A Little More Time on You" (video)
4. "Interview" (video)

== Charts ==
=== Weekly charts ===
Weekly chart performance for "(God Must Have Spent) A Little More Time on You"
Chart (1998–1999)	Peak position
Australia (ARIA)	46
Canada (Nielsen SoundScan)	3
Canada Top Singles (RPM)	9
Canada Adult Contemporary (RPM)	4
US Billboard Hot 100	8
US Adult Contemporary (Billboard)	2
US Adult Pop Airplay (Billboard)	30
US Pop Airplay (Billboard)	5
US Rhythmic Airplay (Billboard)	9

=== Year-end charts ===
Year-end chart performance for "(God Must Have Spent) A Little More Time on You"
Chart (1999)	Position
Canada Top Singles (RPM)	72
Canada Adult Contemporary (RPM)	13
US Billboard Hot 100	45
US Adult Contemporary (Billboard)	4
US Adult Top 40 (Billboard)	81
US Mainstream Top 40 (Billboard)	26
US Rhythmic Top 40 (Billboard)	39

== Release history ==
Release history and formats for "(God Must Have Spent) A Little More Time on You"
Region	Date	Format(s)	Label(s)	Ref.
United States	October 27, 1998	Contemporary hit radio; rhythmic contemporary radio	Jive	
United States	February 9, 1999	CD single	Jive	
Canada	February 16, 1999	Enhanced CD	RCA	

== Alabama version ==
"God Must Have Spent a Little More Time on You"

Single by Alabama featuring *NSYNC

from the album Twentieth Century
- B-side: "Sad Lookin' Moon"
- Released: April 26, 1999
- Genre: Country
- Length: 4:38
- Label: RCA Nashville
- Songwriters: Carl Sturken; Evan Rogers
- Producers: Don Cook; Alabama

Alabama singles chronology
"Keepin' Up" (1998)	"God Must Have Spent a Little More Time on You" (1999)	"Small Stuff" (1999)

In 1999, country music band Alabama recorded the song with a backing vocal from NSYNC, and released it as a single from their eighteenth studio album, Twentieth Century. This version peaked at number three on the Billboard Hot Country Singles & Tracks chart and at number 29 on the Billboard Hot 100. The song is the only country chart entry for NSYNC. This was also Alabama's final top-10 hit on the Billboard country chart until 2011, when they topped the chart as featured on Brad Paisley's "Old Alabama". The song was later included as the B-side to Alabama's next single, "Small Stuff".

=== Weekly charts ===
Weekly chart performance for "God Must Have Spent a Little More Time on You" by Alabama
Chart (1999)	Peak position
Canada Country Singles (RPM)	1
US Billboard Hot 100	29
US Hot Country Songs (Billboard)	3

=== Year-end charts ===
Year-end chart performance for "God Must Have Spent a Little More Time on You" by Alabama
Chart (1999)	Position
Canada Country Tracks (RPM)	8
US Billboard Hot 100	100
US Hot Country Singles & Tracks (Billboard)	14
