= NSYNC discography =

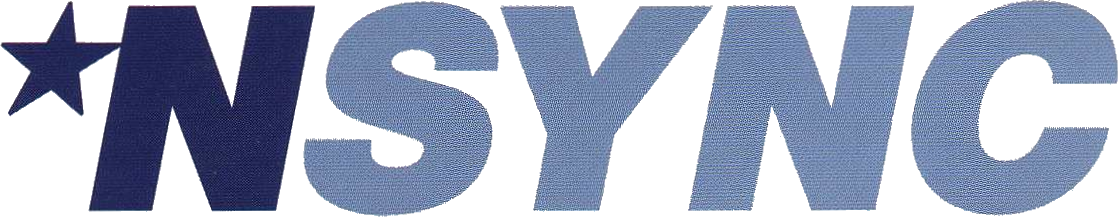
- Studio albums: 4
- Compilation albums: 3
- Singles: 18
- Music videos: 25
- DVDs: 4
- Tours: 4
- Soundtracks: 11
- Holiday albums: 2

American boy band NSYNC has released four studio albums and 18 singles. The band first charted in 1996 and released their self-titled debut album in 1997. Their debut studio album 'N SYNC (1997) was preceded by the lead single "I Want You Back", which entered the top five in New Zealand and the United Kingdom, and the top 20 in the United States. Supported by the commercial success of its lead single "Bye Bye Bye", their third studio album No Strings Attached (2000) debuted with 2.4 million copies sold in the first week. The second single, "It's Gonna Be Me", reached number one on the US Billboard Hot 100. Their first two studio albums were certified Diamond by the Recording Industry Association of America. Celebrity, their fourth and last studio album, was released in 2001 and the single ”Girlfriend” in 2002.

== Albums ==
=== Studio albums ===
List of studio albums, with selected details, chart positions, sales and certifications
| Title | Album details | Peak chart positions | | | | | | | | | | Sales | Certifications |
| Title | Album details | US | AUS | AUT | CAN | GER | IRE | NLD | NZ | SWI | UK | Sales | Certifications |
|---|---|---|---|---|---|---|---|---|---|---|---|---|---|
| 'N Sync | Released: May 26, 1997; Label: RCA; Formats: CD, cassette | 2 | 58 | 2 | 4 | 1 | — | 59 | 34 | 5 | 30 | US: 9,854,000 | RIAA: Diamond; BPI: Silver; BVMI: Gold; IFPI AUT: Gold; IFPI SWI: Gold; MC: 4× Platinum |
| Home for Christmas | Christmas album; Released: November 10, 1998; Label: RCA; Formats: CD, cassette | 7 | — | — | 29 | — | — | — | — | — | — | | RIAA: 2× Platinum; MC: Platinum |
| No Strings Attached | Released: March 21, 2000; Label: Jive; Formats: CD, cassette | 1 | 3 | 16 | 1 | 7 | 27 | 6 | 12 | 7 | 14 | US: 12,980,000; UK: 206,000 | RIAA: Diamond (12× Platinum); ARIA: Platinum; BPI: Gold; BVMI: Gold; MC: Diamond; NVPI: Gold; RMNZ: Gold |
| Celebrity | Released: July 24, 2001; Label: Jive; Formats: CD, cassette | 1 | 10 | 24 | 1 | 5 | 25 | 42 | 10 | 14 | 12 | US: 5,002,000; UK: 110,000 | RIAA: 5× Platinum; ARIA: Gold; BPI: Gold; MC: 5× Platinum |

=== Compilation albums ===
List of compilation albums, with selected details and chart positions
| Title | Album details | Chart positions | | | Certifications |
| Title | Album details | US | CAN | GER | Certifications |
|---|---|---|---|---|---|
| The Winter Album | International Christmas compilation album; Released: November 17, 1998; Formats: CD, cassette | — | — | 31 | |
| Greatest Hits | 1st compilation album; Released: October 25, 2005; Formats: CD, digital download | 47 | 75 | — | BPI: Gold |
| The Collection | 2nd compilation album; Released: January 25, 2010; Formats: CD, digital download | — | — | — | |
| The Essential *NSYNC | 3rd compilation album; Released: July 29, 2014; Formats: CD, LP, digital download | 25 | — | — | BPI: Silver |

== Singles ==
=== As lead artist ===
List of singles as lead artist, with selected chart positions and certifications, showing year released and album name
| Title | Year | Peak chart positions | | | | | | | | | | Certifications | Album |
| Title | Year | US | US AC | US Pop | US Dance | AUS | CAN | GER | NLD | NZ | UK | Certifications | Album |
|---|---|---|---|---|---|---|---|---|---|---|---|---|---|
| "I Want You Back" | 1996 | 13 | — | 7 | 17 | 11 | 6 | 10 | 22 | 5 | 5 | RIAA: Gold; ARIA: Gold; BPI: Silver; BVMI: Gold; MC: Gold; RMNZ: Gold | 'NSync |
| "Tearin' Up My Heart" | 1997 | 59 | — | 6 | — | 20 | 3 | 4 | 31 | 19 | 9 | BPI: Gold; MC: Platinum; RMNZ: Gold | 'NSync |
| "Here We Go" | 1997 | — | — | — | — | — | — | 8 | 66 | — | — | | 'NSync |
| "For the Girl Who Has Everything" | 1997 | — | — | — | — | — | — | 32 | — | — | — | | 'NSync |
| "Together Again" | 1997 | — | — | — | — | — | — | 31 | — | — | — | | 'NSync |
| "U Drive Me Crazy" | 1998 | — | — | — | — | — | — | 30 | — | — | — | | The Winter Album |
| "(God Must Have Spent) A Little More Time on You" | 1998 | 8 | 2 | 5 | — | 46 | 9 | — | — | — | — | | 'NSync |
| "Merry Christmas, Happy Holidays" | 1998 | — | — | 37 | — | — | — | 57 | — | — | — | BPI: Silver; MC: Platinum | Home for Christmas and The Winter Album |
| "Thinking of You (I Drive Myself Crazy)" | 1999 | 67 | — | 14 | — | — | 16 | 71 | 15 | — | — | | 'NSync and The Winter Album |
| "Music of My Heart" (with Gloria Estefan) | 1999 | 2 | 2 | 21 | — | 112 | 30 | — | 58 | — | 34 | RIAA: Gold | Music of the Heart |
| "Bye Bye Bye" | 2000 | 4 | 25 | 1 | — | 1 | 1 | 4 | 4 | 1 | 3 | RIAA: 5× Platinum; ARIA: 7× Platinum; BPI: 2× Platinum; BVMI: Gold; MC: 3× Platinum; RMNZ: 3× Platinum | No Strings Attached |
| "It's Gonna Be Me" | 2000 | 1 | — | 1 | 33 | 11 | 1 | 39 | 30 | 7 | 9 | RIAA: 3× Platinum; ARIA: Platinum; BPI: Gold; MC: Platinum; RMNZ: Platinum | No Strings Attached |
| "I'll Never Stop" | 2000 | — | — | — | — | — | — | 23 | 28 | — | 13 | | No Strings Attached |
| "This I Promise You" (Note: The Spanish version of this song, titled "Yo Te Voy A Amar" was also released as single) | 2000 | 5 | 1 | 4 | 38 | 42 | 8 | 56 | 80 | 32 | 21 | RIAA: Platinum; MC: Platinum; RMNZ: Gold | No Strings Attached |
| "Pop" | 2001 | 19 | — | 5 | 40 | 10 | 1 | 30 | 32 | 19 | 9 | ARIA: Gold | Celebrity |
| "Gone" | 2001 | 11 | 27 | 7 | — | 67 | 28 | 62 | — | — | 24 | | Celebrity |
| "Girlfriend" (featuring Nelly) | 2002 | 5 | — | 5 | — | 2 | 1 | 6 | 8 | 13 | 2 | ARIA: Gold; BPI: Gold | Celebrity |
| "Better Place" | 2023 | 25 | 10 | 16 | — (Note: "Better Place" did not enter Billboard's Hot Dance Club Songs but peaked at number 24 on the Dance/Mix Show Airplay chart.) | — (Note: "Better Place" did not enter the Australian Singles Chart, but peaked at number 24 on the ARIA Digital Track Chart.) | 43 | — (Note: "Better Place" did not enter the German Top Singles Chart but peaked at number 18 on the German Singles Download Chart.) | — (Note: "Better Place" did not enter the Dutch Top 40, but peaked at number 29 on the Tipparade, which acts as an extension to the chart.) | — (Note: "Better Place" did not enter the NZ Top 40 Singles Chart, but peaked at number 27 on the NZ Hot Singles Chart.) | — (Note: "Better Place" did not enter the UK Singles Chart, but peaked at number 24 on the UK Singles Sales Chart.) | RIAA: Platinum; MC: Platinum | Trolls Band Together |
"—" denotes releases that did not chart or were not released in that country.

=== Guest singles ===
List of singles as featured artist, with selected chart positions and certifications, showing year released and album name
| Title | Year | Peak chart positions | | | | | | | | Album |
| Title | Year | US | AUS | AUT | GER | NLD | NZ | SWI | UK | Album |
|---|---|---|---|---|---|---|---|---|---|---|
| "God Must Have Spent a Little More Time on You" (Alabama featuring NSYNC) | 1999 | 29 | — | — | — | — | — | — | — | Twentieth Century |
| "I Believe in You" (Joe featuring NSYNC) | 2001 | — | 51 | — | — | — | — | — | — | My Name Is Joe |
| "What's Going On" (with Artists Against AIDS) | 2001 | 27 | 38 | 51 | 35 | 24 | 18 | 16 | 6 | Non-album singles |
| "Paradise" (Justin Timberlake featuring NSYNC) | 2024 | — | — | — | — | — | — | — | — | Everything I Thought It Was |
"—" denotes releases that did not chart or were not released in that country.

== Soundtracks ==
| Year | Movie | Song |
|---|---|---|
| 1999 | Pokémon: The First Movie | "Somewhere, Someday" |
| 1999 | Light It Up | "If Only in Heaven's Eyes" |
| 1999 | Music of the Heart | "Music of My Heart (with Gloria Estefan) |
| 1999 | Tarzan | "Trashin' the Camp" (with Phil Collins) |
| 2000 | How the Grinch Stole Christmas | "You Don't Have to Be Alone" |
| 2001 | On the Line | "On the Line" |
| 2001 | On the Line | "That Girl (Will Never Be Mine)" |
| 2001 | On the Line | "Falling" |
| 2001 | Longshot | "Feel the Love" |
| 2001 | Jimmy Neutron: Boy Genius | "Pop" (Deep Dish Cha-Ching Remix (Radio Edit)) |
| 2001 | Red Rocket | "Bye Bye Bye" (Suzanna Son cover) |
| 2002 | Disneymania | "When You Wish Upon a Star" |
| 2020 | Supergirl (The Bottle Episode S5E10) | "It's Gonna Be Me" |
| 2023 | Trolls Band Together | "Better Place" |
| 2024 | Deadpool & Wolverine | "Bye Bye Bye" |

== Video albums ==
List of video albums with selected details
| Title | Year | Production details | Ref. |
|---|---|---|---|
| *N the Mix | 1999 | Released: November 10, 1998; Label: RCA; Format: VHS, DVD | |
| Live from Madison Square Garden | 2000 | Released: November 21, 2000; Label: Jive; Format: VHS, DVD | |
| Making the Tour | 2001 | Released: July 9, 2001; Label: Jive; Format: VHS, DVD | |
| PopOdyssey Live | 2002 | Released: May 20, 2002; Label: Jive; Format: DVD | |
| Most Requested Hit Videos | 2003 | Released: February 10, 2003; Label: Jive; Format: DVD | |

=== Biographies ===
- Never Enough (April 2000) – Unofficial biography of the band.
- NSYNC: Insane (September 2000) – Unofficial biography of the band.
- The Reel NSYNC (October 2002) – Documentary filmed by Joey featuring footage of the band backstage and on the road.
- The Ultimate Party (July 2003) – Unofficial documentary charting the history of the group.

=== Promotional ===
- No Strings Attached (November 1999) – Contains a behind the scenes look at the making of the album.
- Bye Bye Bye (September 2000) – Single containing the video for "Bye, Bye, Bye".
- Your Number #1 Video Requests & More (April 2000) – Includes the video for "Bye, Bye, Bye", a live performance of "This I Promise You" and exclusive behind-the-scenes footage.

== Music videos ==
List of music videos with director and year-released
| Title | Year | Director(s) |
|---|---|---|
| "I Want You Back" (Original Version) | 1997 | Alan Calzatti |
| "Tearin' Up My Heart" | 1997 | Stefan Ruzowitzky |
| "Here We Go" | 1997 | Stefan Ruzowitzky |
| "For The Girl Who Has Everything" | 1997 | |
| "Together Again" | 1997 | |
| "I Want You Back" (U.S. Version) | 1998 | Jesse Vaughan, Douglas Biron |
| "(God Must Have Spent) A Little More Time On You" | 1998 | Lionel C. Martin |
| "U Drive Me Crazy" | 1998 | Lionel C. Martin |
| "Merry Christmas, Happy Holidays" | 1998 | Lionel C. Martin |
| "Merry Christmas, Happy Holidays" (Alternative Edit) | 1998 | Lionel C. Martin |
| "Thinking Of You (I Drive Myself Crazy)" | 1999 | Tim Story |
| "Thinking Of You (I Drive Myself Crazy)" (US Version) | 1999 | Tim Story |
| "Music Of My Heart" (with Gloria Stefan) | 1999 | Nigel Dick |
| "Bye Bye Bye" | 2000 | Wayne Isham |
| "It's Gonna Be Me" | 2000 | Wayne Isham |
| "I'll Never Stop" | 2000 | |
| "This I Promise You" (Spanish Version) | 2000 | Dave Meyers |
| "Yo Te Voy A Amar" (This I Promise You Spanish Version) | 2000 | Dave Meyers |
| "I Believe In You" (Joe feat. *NSYNC) | 2001 | |
| "Pop" | 2001 | Wayne Isham |
| "Gone" | 2001 | Herb Ritts |
| "Gone" (Spanish Version) | 2001 | Herb Ritts |
| "Girlfriend" | 2002 | Marc Klasfeld |
| "Girlfriend (The Neptunes Remix)" (feat. Nelly) | 2002 | Marc Klasfeld |

== See also ==
- List of artists who reached number one in the United States
