= Greatest Hits (NSYNC album) =

Greatest hits album by NSYNC
- Released: October 25, 2005
- Genre: Pop
- Length: 46:05 (US)
- Labels: Jive; Trans Continental; Sony BMG

NSYNC chronology
Celebrity (2001)	Greatest Hits (2005)	The Collection (2010)

Professional ratings
Review scores
Source	Rating
AllMusic	4.5/5 stars
Blender	4/5 stars

Greatest Hits is the second compilation album by American boy band NSYNC. Released on October 25, 2005, the album debuted at number 47 on the Billboard 200 albums chart. It did not chart in the UK on release, but debuted at number 96 on the UK Albums Chart dated September 7, 2013, in the wake of NSYNC's brief reunion performance at the 2013 MTV Video Music Awards. It features hits like "Bye Bye Bye", "It's Gonna Be Me", "I Want You Back", "Tearin' Up My Heart" and "Pop". The album is the group's third and final release under Jive Records.

According to Nielsen SoundScan, it has sold 528,000 copies in the US alone as of February 2018. Greatest Hits was certified Silver in United Kingdom in 2018. The album has sold over 600,000 copies worldwide.

== Track listing ==
Greatest Hits track listing
No.	Title	Original release	Length
1.	"Bye Bye Bye"	No Strings Attached	3:22
2.	"Girlfriend" (Neptunes Remix featuring Nelly)	Celebrity	4:45
3.	"This I Promise You" (Radio Version)	No Strings Attached	4:27
4.	"It's Gonna Be Me"	No Strings Attached	3:12
5.	"God Must Have Spent a Little More Time on You" (Radio Version)	*NSYNC	4:04
6.	"I Want You Back"	*NSYNC	3:22
7.	"Pop" (Radio Version)	Celebrity	2:56
8.	"Gone"	Celebrity	4:53
9.	"Tearin' Up My Heart"	*NSYNC	3:30
10.	"I Drive Myself Crazy"	*NSYNC	3:59
11.	"I'll Never Stop" (Radio Version)	No Strings Attached	3:08
12.	"Music of My Heart" (With Gloria Estefan)	Music of the Heart soundtrack	4:31

International bonus track
No.	Title	Length
13.	"Girlfriend" (Caveman Remix)	4:33
14.	"Gone" (Kurtis Mantronik Remix)	5:26
15.	"This I Promise You" (Spanish version)	4:27
16.	"Gone" (Spanish version)	4:53

Japanese bonus track
No.	Title	Length
17.	"I Believe in You" (featuring Joe)	4:14

Deluxe edition bonus DVD
No.	Title	Length
1.	"Bye Bye Bye"	3:20
2.	"Girlfriend"	4:45
3.	"This I Promise You"	4:27
4.	"It's Gonna Be Me"	3:12
5.	"God Must Have Spent a Little More Time on You"	4:04
6.	"I Want You Back"	3:20
7.	"Pop"	2:56
8.	"Gone"	4:53
9.	"Tearin' Up My Heart"	3:30
10.	"I Drive Myself Crazy"	3:59
11.	"I'll Never Stop"	3:08
12.	"This I Promise You" (Spanish version)	4:27
13.	"Gone" (Spanish version)	4:53

== Personnel ==
- Compilation mastered by Chaz Harper at Battery Mastering, NYC
- Art direction: Jackie Murphy & Jeff Gilligan
- Design: Jeff Gilligan
- Photography: Mark Seliger

== Charts ==
2005 chart performance for Greatest Hits
Chart (2005-2006)	Peak position
Argentine Albums (CAPIF)	16
Canadian Albums (Nielsen SoundScan)	75
Danish Albums (Hitlisten)	32
Japanese Albums (Oricon)	63
Malaysian International Albums (RIM)	15
UK Albums (Official Charts)	96
US Billboard 200	47
US Top Catalog Albums (Billboard)	2

2024 chart performance for Greatest Hits
Chart (2024)	Peak position
Canadian Albums (Billboard)	80

== Certifications and sales ==
Certifications and sales for Greatest Hits
Region	Certification	Certified units/sales
United Kingdom (BPI)	Gold	100,000^{‡}
United States	—	528,000
^{‡} Sales+streaming figures based on certification alone.
