= The Essential *NSYNC =

Greatest hits album by NSYNC
- Released: July 29, 2014
- Genres: Pop, R&B
- Length: 99:14
- Labels: RCA/Jive; Legacy
- Producers: Jan Van Der Toorn; Denniz Pop; Max Martin; Kristian Lundin; Dan Muckala; Carl Sturken and Evan Rogers; Veit Renn; David Foster; Rami Yacoub; Richard Marx; Robin Wiley; The Neptunes; BT; Allstar Gordon

NSYNC chronology
The Collection (2010)	The Essential *NSYNC (2014)

The Essential *NSYNC is the fourth compilation album by American boy band NSYNC. It was released on July 29, 2014, four years after their third compilation The Collection (2010). It is also the second overall album under RCA Records following their self-titled album in 1998. The album contains a total of thirty-four tracks, including hit singles, album tracks, B-sides, rare recordings, and soundtrack features. Despite being only a compilation release, the album received widespread press coverage after it was revealed that none of the band members had been told about its release.

The album sold out on Amazon on the day of release, and quickly vaulted into the top ten albums on the iTunes Store.

Band member Lance Bass said of the album on his radio show, Dirty Pop: "There's a lot of these songs I don't think I've ever heard, I remember recording them but I've never heard them before, so I'm interested in just hearing them." JC Chasez tweeted about the album's release, stating: "I had the strangest dream last night that some old friends and I had a top 10 record on iTunes. Crazy right..." Chris Kirkpatrick said of the album; "It's great to release some of the songs that had never made a record before! I'm glad our long time fans get some new music!" Joey Fatone also said; "Pretty interesting this album comes out, which I really had no idea, and it's in the top of Amazon and iTunes... we owe it to our fans. Thank you."

== Reception ==
Professional ratings
Review scores
Source	Rating
AllMusic	4/5 stars
PopMatters	3/10

Stephen Thomas Erlewine of AllMusic said, "If these deep cuts appeal to you, Essential is the *NSYNC comp to get: it captures all the hits and hubris of their glory years. If all you need are the songs that were on Total Request Live, stick with Greatest Hits". Evan Sawdey of PopMatters said, "For fans, it has everything you could possibly need. For everyone else, it's a lengthy time capsule that is best kept where most time capsules should be: buried underground where no one can find it".

The album had sold 34,000 copies in the US according to Nielsen SoundScan as of February 2018.

== Track listing ==
Disc one
No.	Title	Writer(s)	Producer(s)	Length
1.	"Here We Go" (Radio cut)	Bulent "Bonny" Aris, Toni Cottura, Jan Van Der Toorn	Aris, Cottura, Van Der Toorn	3:35
2.	"I Want You Back" (Radio edit)	Denniz Pop, Max Martin	Denniz Pop, Max Martin	3:21
3.	"Tearin' Up My Heart" (Radio edit)	Kristian Lundin, Martin	Kristian Lundin	3:29
4.	"(God Must Have Spent) A Little More Time on You" (Remix)	Carl Sturken, Evan Rogers	Carl Sturken, Evan Rogers	4:02
5.	"I Drive Myself Crazy" (Remix)	Rick Nowels, Allan Rich, Ellen Shipley	Veit Renn	3:59
6.	"For the Girl Who Has Everything" (Radio mix)	Jolyon Skinner, Veit Renn	Veit Renn	3:58
7.	"Are You Gonna Be There?"	Diane Warren	Veit Renn	4:07
8.	"Music of My Heart" (featuring Gloria Estefan)	Gloria Estefan, Diane Warren	David Foster	4:31
9.	"Bye Bye Bye"	Lundin, Jake Schulze, Andreas Carlsson	Kristian Lundin, Jake Schulze	3:21
10.	"It's Gonna Be Me"	Martin, Carlsson, Rami Yacoub	Rami Yacoub	3:13
11.	"This I Promise You" (Radio edit)	Richard Marx	Richard Marx	4:26
12.	"I Thought She Knew"	Robin Wiley	Wiley	3:22
13.	"I Believe in You" (Joe featuring NSYNC)	Joe Thomas, Skinner, Renn, Allen Gordon	Jim Steinman, Allen "Allstar" Gordon	4:58
14.	"If I'm Not the One"	Fredrik Thomander, Anders Wikstrom	Gary Carolla, Peter Ries	3:22
15.	"Pop" (Radio version)	Justin Timberlake, Wade Robson	Brian Wayne "BT" Transeau, Justin Timberlake, Wade Robson	2:57
16.	"Girlfriend" (The Neptunes Remix featuring Nelly)	Timberlake, Chad Hugo, Pharrell Williams, Cornell Haynes Jr.	The Neptunes	4:46
17.	"Gone"	Timberlake, Robson	Timberlake, Wade Robson	4:52

Disc two
No.	Title	Writer(s)	Producer(s)	Length
1.	"More Than a Feeling"	Tom Scholz	Japp Eggermont	3:41
2.	"Best of My Life"	Aris, Cottura, Van Der Toorn	Aris, Cottura, Van Der Toorn	4:45
3.	"The Lion Sleeps Tonight"	Hugo Peretti, Luigi Creatore, George David Weiss, Albert Stanton, Solomon Linda	Gary Carolla	3:11
4.	"Sailing"	Christopher Cross	Veit Renn	4:37
5.	"Everything I Own"	David Gates	Full Force	3:56
6.	"(God Must Have Spent) A Little More Time on You" (Alabama featuring NSYNC)	Carl Sturken, Evan Rogers	Alabama, Don Cook	4:39
7.	"Somewhere, Someday"	Mark Mueller, Andrew Goldmark	Mark Mueller	4:06
8.	"Trashin' the Camp" (featuring Phil Collins)	Phil Collins	Phil Collins	2:23
9.	"If Only Through Heaven's Eyes"	Kenneth "Babyface" Edmonds	Kenneth "Babyface" Edmonds	4:37
10.	"You Don't Have to Be Alone (On Christmas)"	JC Chasez, Renn, David Nicoll	Veit Renn	4:33
11.	"On the Line" (with the "On the Line" All-Stars (Mandy Moore / Christian Burns / True Vibe)	Steve Diamond, Paul Vann, Mark Hammond	Dan Muckala	3:18
12.	"That Girl (Will Never Be Mine)"	Carlsson, Lundin, Jake Schulze	Kristian Lundin, Jake Schulze	3:25
13.	"Falling"	Chris Kirkpatrick, Bryan Popin, Gary Brown, Ira Schickman	David Foster, Kirkpatrick	3:48
14.	"Feel the Love"	Brian Dow, Jonathan StAimee, Bradley Young	Bradley Young	3:10
15.	"Selfish"	Chasez, Skinner, Renn	Brian McKnight	4:19
16.	"See Right Through You"	Timberlake, Robson, Larry Campbell	Timberlake, Wade Robson	2:54
17.	"Believe in Yourself"	Joe Raposo	Timberlake	1:42

== Charts ==
Chart performance for The Essential *NSYNC
Chart (2014)	Peak position
US Billboard 200	25

== Certifications ==
Certifications for The Essential *NSYNC
Region	Certification	Certified units/sales
United Kingdom (BPI)	Silver	60,000^{‡}
^{‡} Sales+streaming figures based on certification alone.
