= 2000 Teen Choice Awards =

American awards ceremony held in California

- Date: August 6, 2000
- Location: Barker Hangar, Santa Monica, California
- Hosted by: None
- Website: http://www.empireonline.com

Television/radio coverage
- Network: Fox

The 2000 Teen Choice Awards ceremony was held on August 6, 2000, at the Barker Hangar, Santa Monica, California. The awards celebrated the year's achievements in music, film, television, sports, fashion, comedy and the Internet, and were voted on by teen viewers aged 13 through 19. The event had no designated host but Freddie Prinze Jr. introduced the show with 98 Degrees, BBMak, No Doubt and Enrique Iglesias as performers.

== Performers ==
- Enrique Iglesias – "Be with You"
- BBMak – "Back Here"
- No Doubt – "Simple Kind of Life"
- 98 Degrees – "Give Me Just One Night (Una Noche)"

== Presenters ==
- Freddie Prinze Jr. – presented Choice Female Artist
- Hanson and Mandy Moore – presented Choice Movie Chemistry
- Jennifer Love Hewitt – introduced Enrique Iglesias
- Leslie Bibb and Carly Pope – presented Choice TV Personality and introduced Tyra Banks and Scott Foley
- Tyra Banks and Scott Foley – presented Choice Pop Group
- Justin Berfield, Christopher Masterson, Frankie Muniz, and Erik Per Sullivan – presented Choice Breakout Artist
- Carmen Electra and Usher – presented Choice Athlete
- Aaliyah and Pink – presented Choice Music Male Artist
- Keri Russell – presented Choice Female and Male Hottie
- Aaron Carter, Hoku, and Don Phillip – introduced BBMak
- Jessica Alba and Michael Weatherly – presented Choice Breakout TV Show
- Jamie Foxx – presented Choice Summer Movie Wipeout
- Ananda Lewis and Andy Dick – presented Choice Love Song
- Carson Daly – introduced No Doubt
- Drew Pinsky and Adam Carolla – presented Choice Movie Hissy Fit
- Vitamin C and Ricki Lake – presented Choice Drama TV Show
- Rachael Leigh Cook and Jeremy McGrath – presented Choice Rock Group
- Gotti 13 and Holly Beck – introduced Melissa Joan Hart
- Melissa Joan Hart – introduced 98 Degrees
- Bill Goldberg and Kathy Griffin – presented Choice TV Sidekick and introduced Ray J and Brandy
- Brandy and Ray J – presented Extraordinary Achievement Award
- Shiri Appleby, Jason Behr, Majandra Delfino, Brendan Fehr, and Katherine Heigl – presented Choice TV Actress
- Britney Spears – presented Choice Comedy TV Show
- Leelee Sobieski and Paul Walker – presented Choice Movie Actor
- Topher Grace, Mila Kunis, Ashton Kutcher, Danny Masterson, Laura Prepon, and Wilmer Valderrama – presented Choice Summer Song
- 98 Degrees – presented Choice Summer Movie

== Nominees ==
Winners are highlighted in bold text.

=== Movies ===
Choice Movie Actor	Choice Movie Actress
**Freddie Prinze Jr. – Down to You**; Ben Affleck – Reindeer Games; Jason Biggs – American Pie; Tom Cruise – Mission: Impossible 2; Matt Damon – The Talented Mr. Ripley; Leonardo DiCaprio – The Beach; Omar Epps – Love & Basketball; Tobey Maguire – The Cider House Rules	**Julia Roberts – Erin Brockovich**; Cameron Diaz – Being John Malkovich; Kirsten Dunst – The Virgin Suicides; Angelina Jolie – Girl, Interrupted; Natalie Portman – Where the Heart Is; Christina Ricci – Sleepy Hollow; Julia Stiles – Down to You; Charlize Theron – The Cider House Rules
Choice Drama Movie	Choice Comedy Movie
**The Sixth Sense**; American Beauty; The Beach; The Cider House Rules; Girl, Interrupted; Love & Basketball; Romeo Must Die; The Talented Mr. Ripley	**Austin Powers: The Spy Who Shagged Me**; American Pie; Deuce Bigalow: Male Gigolo; Down to You; Galaxy Quest; High Fidelity; Road Trip; Whatever It Takes
Choice Movie Sleazebag	Choice Breakout Movie Star
**Mike Myers – Austin Powers: The Spy Who Shagged Me**; Ben Affleck – Boiler Room; Andy Dick – Road Trip; Scott Foley – Scream 3; James Franco – Whatever It Takes; Helen Mirren – Teaching Mrs. Tingle; Trevor Morgan – The Sixth Sense; Seann William Scott – American Pie	**Haley Joel Osment – The Sixth Sense**; Wes Bentley – American Beauty; Josh Hartnett – Here on Earth; Chris Klein – American Pie; Jude Law – The Talented Mr. Ripley; Leelee Sobieski – Here on Earth; Mena Suvari – American Beauty; Hilary Swank – Boys Don't Cry
Choice Movie Chemistry	Choice Movie Hissy Fit
**David Arquette & Courteney Cox Arquette – Scream 3**; Jason Biggs – American Pie; Leonardo DiCaprio & Virginie Ledoyen – The Beach; Omar Epps & Sanaa Lathan – Love & Basketball; Katie Holmes & Barry Watson – Teaching Mrs. Tingle; Breckin Meyer & Amy Smart – Road Trip; Mike Myers & Mindy Sterling – Austin Powers: The Spy Who Shagged Me; Freddie Prinze Jr. & Julia Stiles – Down to You	**Lisa Kudrow – Hanging Up**; Rosanna Arquette – The Whole Nine Yards; Joan Cusack – Toy Story 2; John Cusack – High Fidelity; Cameron Diaz – Any Given Sunday; Angelina Jolie – Girl, Interrupted; Jodi Lyn O'Keefe – Whatever It Takes; Ben Stiller – Mystery Men
Choice Movie Liar	Choice Summer Movie Wipeout
**Tom Green – Road Trip**; Matt Damon – The Talented Mr. Ripley; Joshua Jackson – The Skulls; Chris Klein – American Pie; Tobey Maguire – Wonder Boys; Steve Martin – Bowfinger; Amanda Peet – The Whole Nine Yards; Giovanni Ribisi – Boiler Room	**Jim Carrey – Me, Myself & Irene**; Jason Biggs – Loser; Tom Cruise – Mission: Impossible 2; Martin Lawrence – Big Momma's House
Choice Summer Movie	
**Scary Movie**; Big Momma's House; Gone in 60 Seconds; Loser; Me, Myself & Irene; The Patriot; Shaft; X-Men	

=== Television ===
Choice TV Actor	Choice TV Actress
**Joshua Jackson – Dawson's Creek**; Jason Behr – Roswell; David Boreanaz – Angel; Scott Foley – Felicity; Topher Grace – That '70s Show; Seth Green – Buffy the Vampire Slayer; Frankie Muniz – Malcolm in the Middle; Scott Speedman – Felicity	**Sarah Michelle Gellar – Buffy the Vampire Slayer**; Shiri Appleby – Roswell; Leslie Bibb – Popular; Anne Hathaway – Get Real; Katie Holmes – Dawson's Creek; Mila Kunis – That '70s Show; Carly Pope – Popular; Keri Russell – Felicity
Choice Drama TV Show	Choice Comedy TV Show
**Dawson's Creek**; 7th Heaven; Buffy the Vampire Slayer; Charmed; Felicity; Get Real; Once and Again; Roswell	**Friends**; Just Shoot Me!; Malcolm in the Middle; Popular; The Simpsons; That '70s Show; The Tom Green Show; Will & Grace
Choice Breakout TV Show	Choice TV Personality
**Popular**; Angel; Daddio; Get Real; Making the Band; Malcolm in the Middle; Roswell; Total Request Live	**Carson Daly**; Tom Green; Chris Kattan; Ananda Lewis; Regis Philbin; William Shatner; Sock Puppet; Space Ghost
Choice TV Sidekick	
**Sean Hayes – Will & Grace**; Brendan Fehr – Roswell; Ian Gomez – Felicity; Alyson Hannigan – Buffy the Vampire Slayer; Amy Jo Johnson – Felicity; Ron Lester – Popular; James Marsters – Buffy the Vampire Slayer; Danny Masterson – That '70s Show	

=== Music ===
Choice Male Artist	Choice Female Artist
**Sisqó**; Marc Anthony; D'Angelo; Dr. Dre; Kid Rock; Lenny Kravitz; Ricky Martin; Will Smith	**Britney Spears**; Christina Aguilera; Mariah Carey; Missy Elliott; Macy Gray; Jennifer Lopez; Mandy Moore; Jessica Simpson
Choice Pop Group	Choice Rock Group
**NSYNC**; 702; 98 Degrees; Backstreet Boys; Destiny's Child; LFO; Savage Garden; TLC	**Blink-182**; Goo Goo Dolls; Korn; Limp Bizkit; Lit; No Doubt; Smash Mouth; Sugar Ray
Choice Single	Choice Album
**"Bye Bye Bye" – NSYNC**; "All the Small Things" – Blink-182; "Cowboy" – Kid Rock; "Oops!...I Did It Again" – Britney Spears; "Say My Name" – Destiny's Child; "Show Me the Meaning of Being Lonely" – Backstreet Boys; "Someday" – Sugar Ray; "What a Girl Wants" – Christina Aguilera	**Millennium – Backstreet Boys**; Christina Aguilera – Christina Aguilera; Devil Without a Cause – Kid Rock; Enema of the State – Blink-182; No Strings Attached – NSYNC; Oops!... I Did It Again – Britney Spears; Significant Other – Limp Bizkit; Voodoo – D'Angelo
Choice R&B/Hip-Hop Track	Choice Love Song
**"Thong Song" – Sisqó**; "Forgot About Dre" – Dr. Dre featuring Eminem; "Holla Holla" – Ja Rule; "Hot Boyz" – Missy Elliott; ”Imperial" – Rah Digga feat. Busta Rhymes; "Say My Name" – Destiny's Child; "Untitled (How Does It Feel)" – D'Angelo; "You Can Do It" – Ice Cube	**"Where You Are" – Jessica Simpson feat. Nick Lachey**; "Back at One" – Brian McKnight; "From the Bottom of My Broken Heart" – Britney Spears; "I Knew I Loved You" – Savage Garden; "I Turn to You" – Christina Aguilera; "I Wanna Love You Forever" – Jessica Simpson; "Show Me the Meaning of Being Lonely" – Backstreet Boys; "Thank God I Found You" – Mariah Carey feat. 98 Degrees & Joe
Choice Breakout Artist	Choice Music Video
**Jessica Simpson**; Marc Anthony; Blink-182; Filter; Macy Gray; Enrique Iglesias; Pink; Sisqó	**"It's Gonna Be Me" – NSYNC**; "Adam's Song" – Blink-182; "I Do" – Blaque; "The One" – Backstreet Boys; "Oops!... I Did It Again" – Britney Spears; "Pumping on Your Stereo" – Supergrass; "The Real Slim Shady" – Eminem; "Thong Song" – Sisqó
Choice Summer Song	
**"It's Gonna Be Me" – NSYNC**; "Be with You" – Enrique Iglesias; "I Turn to You" – Christina Aguilera; "Incomplete" – Sisqó; "Oops!...I Did It Again" – Britney Spears; "The Real Slim Shady" – Eminem; "There You Go" – Pink; "Try Again" – Aaliyah	

=== Miscellaneous ===
Choice Male Hottie	Choice Female Hottie
**Justin Timberlake**; Nick Carter; Enrique Iglesias; Ashton Kutcher; Ryan Phillippe; Ivan Sergei; Paul Walker; Shane West	**Britney Spears**; Christina Aguilera; Rachael Leigh Cook; Sarah Michelle Gellar; Jennifer Love Hewitt; Lil' Kim; Jennifer Lopez; Jessica Simpson
Choice Comedian	Choice Male Athlete
**Adam Sandler**; Jim Carrey; Kathy Griffin; Martin Lawrence; Jay Leno; David Letterman; Chris Rock; Shawn Wayans	**Kobe Bryant**; Andre Agassi; Vince Carter; Ken Griffey Jr.; Derek Jeter; Sammy Sosa; Kurt Warner; Tiger Woods
Choice Female Athlete	Choice Male Extreme Athlete
**Mia Hamm**; Brandi Chastain; Lindsay Davenport; Martina Hingis; Chamique Holdsclaw; Michelle Kwan; Dominique Moceanu; Jenny Thompson	**Tony Hawk**; Tommy Clowers; Laird Hamilton; Bucky Lasek; Jeremy McGrath; Dave Mirra; Shaun Palmer; Kelly Slater
Choice Female Extreme Athlete	Choice Pro Wrestler
**Holly Beck**; Megan Abubo; Lisa Andersen; Layne Beachley; Tara Dakides; Dallas Friday; Vicki Golden; Laia Sanz	**The Rock**; Big Show; Chyna; Goldberg; Jeff Hardy; Chris Jericho; Kevin Nash; Triple H
Choice Model	
**Tyra Banks**; Caprice Bourret; Gisele Bündchen; Jaime King; Rebecca Romijn-Stamos; Antonio Sabàto Jr.; Molly Sims; Kim Smith	
