= Chuck Taylor (music journalist) =

American journalist

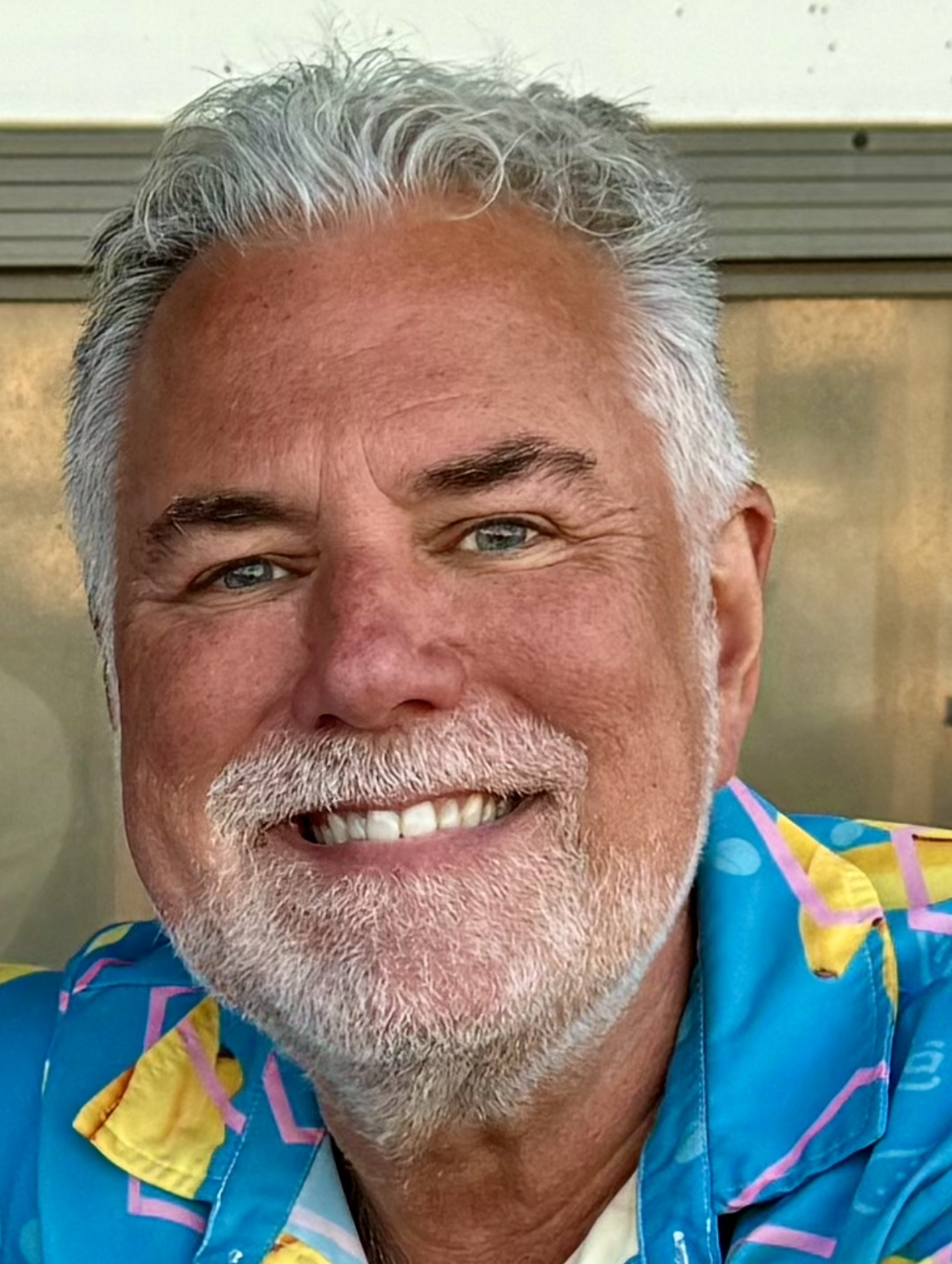
Chuck Taylor, 2025

Chuck Taylor (born September 28, 1962 in Lynchburg, Virginia, United States) is an American music journalist. He served as a reporter, senior writer, columnist and senior editor at Billboard magazine from 1995 to 2009. There, he held the titles of Senior Editor/Talent, Senior Writer, Radio Editor, host of the online "Billboard Radio Countdown," "AirWaves" columnist and Single Reviews Editor; as well as Managing Editor of Top 40/AC for affiliated publication Billboard Radio Monitor, and Senior Editor/Features and AC format editor for Billboard sister Radio & Records.

== Life ==
Taylor graduated from James Madison University (Journalism and Speech/English), then worked in metro Washington, D.C., for 11 years, including writing and editing gigs at Washington Business Journal and Radio World, as well as a public relations stint as Editor for Clark Construction Group, before relocating to New York in September 1995 to begin his career at Billboard.

Taylor has interviewed more than 2,000 artists and music executives, including Olivia Newton-John, Celine Dion, Britney Spears, Paul McCartney, Elton John, Josh Groban, Bette Midler, James Taylor, Tony Bennett and Toni Braxton. He also penned liner notes for 'N Sync's "Greatest Hits" and Backstreet Boys 2015 Box Set, and was a regular contributor to Time-Life's themed music compilations throughout the 1990s.

He has been interviewed on music and pop culture topics on ABC's "20/20", "CBS Evening News", CNNfn, VH1's “Behind the Music,” MTV, BBC, A&E's "Biography" and E!; and has been quoted in The New York Times, USA Today, TV Guide, People, Parade, Us and Entertainment Weekly. Taylor was profiled in the career manual, "How To Get A Job in the Music Industry" (ISBN 978-0876390726) written by Keith Hatschek.

Taylor's artist specialty at Billboard was Céline Dion. He penned seven front-page articles covering the singer, including her first global interview previewing the release of the 2003 album "A New Day." He also commandeered a Celine Dion Special Section in the magazine in February 2008; and wrote liner notes for Sony Music for the re-release of Dion's "These Are Special Times" and "A New Day Has Come." He was a media spokesman on VH1's "Behind the Music" and E!'s "True Hollywood Story" on Dion, as well as various publications profiling the artist, including The New York Times.

Taylor is a voting member of the National Academy of Recording Arts and Sciences (the Grammy Awards) and a published songwriter for Young Pals Music/BMI. His lyrical composition "Lost and Found," performed by Miz Metro, with music by Ayhan Sahin and Eve Nelson, was featured in an episode of MTV's "Made" in March 2008. Taylor also has co-written songs recorded by Universal artist Karine Hannah, Young Pals Music's Tinatin (including a cameo in her music video for "Wild") and Sony Turkey singer/songwriter Emre Yilmaz, whose single "Only Yesterday," written by Ayhan Sahin, Taylor and Yilmaz, became a U.S. graduation anthem.

On-air DJ experience includes country WWOD-AM/AC WKZZ-FM in Lynchburg, Va., as well as voiceover work for commercials and theater. He hosted Billboard's weekly online countdown at billboardradio.com, from its inception in March 1998 through January 2006. The show was scripted by renowned Billboard writer and author Fred Bronson. He also wrote and hosted daily music trivia show "Time Zone" for FMG Radio in 2013; and was a correspondent for NPR Radio in 1999.

Taylor now lives in Richmond and Norfolk, Va., where he hosts gatherings at his MidCentury Modern "Wiseacre Estate" in Norfolk. His most recent freelance work has appeared in Virginia Living magazine.
