= This I Promise You =

2000 single by NSYNC

Single by NSYNC

from the album No Strings Attached
- B-side: "I Thought She Knew"; "Yo te Voy a Amar"
- Released: September 19, 2000
- Studio: The Treehouse (North Hollywood, California); Westlake Recording Studios (West Hollywood, California)
- Genre: R&B; pop
- Length: 4:44 (album version); 4:27 (radio edit)
- Label: Jive
- Songwriter: Richard Marx
- Producer: Richard Marx

NSYNC singles chronology
"I'll Never Stop" (2000)	"This I Promise You" (2000)	"Pop" (2001)

Music video
- "This I Promise You" on YouTube

"This I Promise You" is a ballad recorded by American boy band NSYNC. It was released in September 2000 as the third and final single in the United States and the fourth and final single in Europe from their third studio album, No Strings Attached (2000). The song is included on all three of the band's compilation albums: Greatest Hits (2005), The Collection (2010), and The Essential *NSYNC (2014). The single reached number five on the US Billboard Hot 100.

A Spanish language version of the song, titled "Yo te Voy a Amar", was recorded at the same time for Spanish-speaking countries.

== Background ==
Richard Marx was asked by A&R executive David Novik if he had any songs that he could give to NSYNC. He specifically requested a ballad. Initially, the song "This I Promise You" was written with a three-person girl group in mind. Marx quickly finished the song writing the harmonies specifically for NSYNC.

Marx would later record the song twice, first for the Japanese release of his 2000 album Days in Avalon similar to the NSYNC version from their album No Strings Attached, and again as a rock song for the European version of his 2010 Stories to Tell album. Marx would later use the Days in Avalon version of "This I Promise You" for his 2014 Now and Forever: The Ballads album as a duet with singer Sabrina.

== Commercial performance ==
"This I Promise You" was NSYNC's fifth top-ten single in the U.S., reaching number five on the Billboard Hot 100 chart in the autumn of 2000. In addition, the song spent 13 weeks at number one on the Billboard Adult Contemporary chart, the group's first and only song to do so. Internationally, the song reached number twenty-one on the UK Singles Chart.

== Music video ==
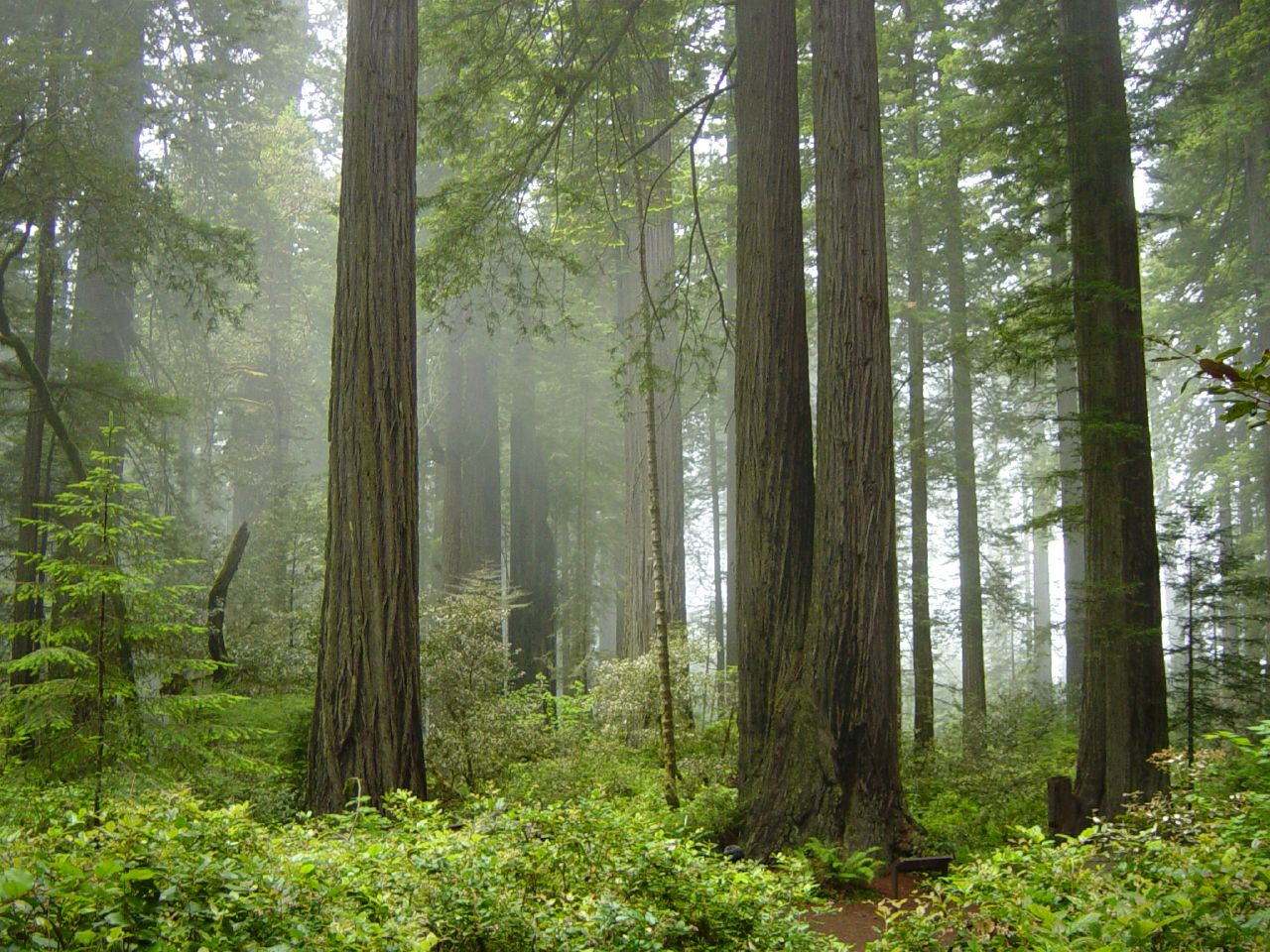
The video was shot at Redwood National and State Parks.

=== Background ===
The music video was shot at Redwood National Park and San Francisco's Embarcadero in 2000 by Dave Meyers. During the video shoot, Justin Timberlake and Joey Fatone ended up exploring Alcatraz Federal Penitentiary without paying for tickets. Both members were eventually caught when they reached Al Capone's cell, and let off with a warning.

It debuted on an episode of Total Request Live on October 27, 2000.

=== Synopsis ===
The video shows the group members clad in turtlenecks singing in the Redwood National and State Parks, with different shots of different love relationships shown in bubbles floating around the forest. Footage of the San Francisco skyline appears at different intervals and at the key change towards the end of the song, the video pans to the members of NSYNC sitting at a table of an outdoor restaurant along the Embarcadero while eating and singing.

The music video on YouTube has received over 300 million views as of May 2024.

== Cover versions ==
A Spanish language version of the song, titled "Yo te Voy a Amar" was recorded at the same time and released in the Spanish-speaking countries in Latin America and Spain.

Irish Westlife lead singer Shane Filan included his version of the song on his third solo album Love Always in 2017. This served as a buzz single which was first released online and later released with a music video exclusively available in Europe. He dedicated this song to his wife Gillian Walsh.

== Track listing ==
=== UK ===
CD single

1. "This I Promise You" (Radio Edit) – 4:27
2. "It's Gonna Be Me" (Maurice Joshua Radio Remix) – 4:13
3. "I Thought She Knew" – 3:22

Cassette

1. "This I Promise You" (Radio Edit) – 4:27
2. "This I Promise You" (Hex Hector Radio Mix) – 3:57
3. "I Thought She Knew" – 3:22

=== America ===
Making the Tour exclusive bonus disc

1. "This I Promise You" (Live Home Video Mix) – 5:10

=== Europe ===
CD1

1. "This I Promise You" (Album Version) – 4:43
2. "This I Promise You" (Hex Hector Radio Mix) – 3:57

CD2

1. "This I Promise You" (Album Version) – 4:43
2. "I Thought She Knew" – 3:22

Limited edition remix single

1. "This I Promise You" (Album Version) – 4:43
2. "This I Promise You" (Hex Hector Club Mix) – 9:10
3. "This I Promise You" (Hex Hector Radio Mix) – 3:57
4. "Yo te Voy a Amar" (Spain Only)

== Credits and personnel ==
Personnel

- Richard Marx – songwriter, producer, arranger
- David Cole – recording engineer, mixing engineer
- Adam Barber – vocal recording
- Cesar Ramirez – assistant engineer
- Ok Hee Kim – assistant engineer
- Toby Dearborn – assistant engineer
- Jeffrey CJ Vanston – drum and keyboard programming
- Michael Thompson – guitar
- Chaz Harper – mastering

== Charts ==
=== Weekly charts ===
Weekly chart performance for "This I Promise You"
Chart (2000–2001)	Peak position
Australia (ARIA)	42
Belgium (Ultratop 50 Flanders)	43
Belgium (Ultratip Bubbling Under Wallonia)	18
Canada Top Singles (RPM)	8
Canada Adult Contemporary (RPM)	8
Dominican Republic (Notimex)	5
El Salvador (EFE)	2
Europe (European Hot 100 Singles)	55
Europe (European Hit Radio)	50
Germany (GfK)	37
Guatemala (EFE)	3
Ireland (IRMA)	36
Italy (Musica e dischi)	45
New Zealand (Recorded Music NZ)	32
Netherlands (Dutch Top 40 Tipparade)	5
Netherlands (Single Top 100)	80
Nicaragua (Notimex)	3
Panama (EFE)	10
Scottish Singles Sales (Official Charts)	24
Spain (PROMUSICAE)	7
Spain Airplay (Top 40 Radio)	15
Sweden (Sverigetopplistan)	12
Switzerland (Schweizer Hitparade)	40
UK Singles (Official Charts)	21
UK Indie (Official Charts)	7
US Billboard Hot 100	5
US Adult Contemporary (Billboard)	1
US Adult Pop Airplay (Billboard)	27
US Dance Singles Sales (Billboard)	38
US Hot Latin Songs (Billboard)	34
US Pop Airplay (Billboard)	4
US Rhythmic Airplay (Billboard)	20
Venezuela (EFE)	10

=== Year-end charts ===
2000 year-end chart performance for "This I Promise You"
Chart (2000)	Position
Brazil (Crowley)	100
US Mainstream Top 40 (Billboard)	56
US Rhythmic Top 40 (Billboard)	59

2001 year-end chart performance for "This I Promise You"
Chart (2001)	Position
Canada Radio (Nielsen BDS)	24
Sweden (Hitlistan)	94
US Billboard Hot 100	51
US Adult Contemporary (Billboard)	2

== Certifications ==
Region	Certification	Certified units/sales
Canada (Music Canada)	Platinum	80,000^{‡}
New Zealand (RMNZ)	Gold	15,000^{‡}
United Kingdom (BPI)	Silver	200,000^{‡}
United States (RIAA)	Platinum	1,000,000^{‡}
^{‡} Sales+streaming figures based on certification alone.

== Release history ==
Release dates for "This I Promise You"
Region	Date	Format	Label	Ref.
United States	September 19, 2000	Contemporary hit radio	Jive	
United Kingdom	November 20, 2000	CD; cassette	Jive	

== See also ==
- List of Billboard Adult Contemporary number ones of 2000 and 2001 (U.S.)
