= I'll Never Stop =

2000 single by NSYNC

Single by NSYNC

from the album No Strings Attached (international editions)
- Released: May 30, 2000
- Recorded: July 17–18, 1999
- Studio: Cheiron, Stockholm, Sweden; Battery, New York City, U.S.
- Length: 3:07
- Label: Jive
- Songwriters: Max Martin; Kristian Lundin; Alexander Kronlund
- Producer: Lundin

NSYNC singles chronology
"It's Gonna Be Me" (2000)	"I'll Never Stop" (2000)	"This I Promise You" (2000)

Music video
- "I'll Never Stop" on YouTube

"I'll Never Stop" is a song by American boy band NSYNC. It was released through Jive Records as the second single from the international edition of their third studio album, No Strings Attached (2000) on May 30, 2000. The song was written by Max Martin, Alexander Kronlund, and the producer Kristian Lundin. "I'll Never Stop" topped the charts in El Salvador, and peaked at number 13 on the UK Singles Chart, and charted in the top 20 in Scotland, Sweden, and the Czech Republic. The song was later included on NSYNC's 2005 greatest hits album Greatest Hits, which was its first release in the United States.

== Background and release ==
"I'll Never Stop" was recorded by NSYNC in Battery Studios on the weekend of July 17–18, 1999, during their break from the NSYNC in Concert tour in New York. The song was written by Max Martin, Alexander Kronlund, and the producer Kristian Lundin, who produced the song at Cheiron Studios in Sweden. "I'll Never Stop" was released worldwide on various airplay formats in May 2000, as stated on the May 20, 2000 issue of Music & Media. It was released as a CD and maxi single in Europe on May 30, 2000, and as a CD and cassette single in the United Kingdom on July 10, 2000. The song was included on the band's first greatest hits album titled Greatest Hits on October 25, 2005, which was the first release of the song in the United States.

"I'll Never Stop" was the biggest-selling cassette single in the United Kingdom between 2009 and 2011, several years after cassettes were replaced by other music formats. The song sold 24 copies in 2009, 13 copies in 2010, and 11 copies in 2011. Music Week suggested that a sole retailer continuously sold copies throughout the country.

== Commercial performance ==
"I'll Never Stop" debuted at the number 13 peak on the UK Singles Chart dated July 16, 2000, where it remained for six weeks. On the Scottish Singles Chart dated July 16, 2000, the song bowed at the number 15 peak. In the Czech Republic, "I'll Never Stop" peaked at number 11 on the International Federation of the Phonographic Industry (IFPI) Czech Republic 1 – Radio Journal chart. On the Swedish Sverigetopplistan, the song debuted at number 29 on the chart dated June 22, 2000. It peaked at number 20 on the chart dated July 20, 2000, and remained for 10 weeks. In Germany, "I'll Never Stop" debuted on the Official German Charts at the number 23 peak on the chart dated June 19, 2000, and charted for nine weeks.

== Music video ==
The music video for "I'll Never Stop" was released in several European territories on the week of May 27, 2000. The video features four members of an NSYNC fan club dancing to the song, while they watch superimposed footage of the band on various objects such as mirrors, laptops, and pages of scrapbook photos. The fan club consists of a green room with memorabilia, including the single cover of "Bye Bye Bye" pasted on the front door. The footage of NSYNC consists of a real life montage of the group participating in various photoshoots in Times Square, concert footage from the NSYNC 'N Concert pay-per-view, and rehearsals in a baseball park. As of July 2020, the video has over 12 million views on YouTube.

== Track listing ==
UK CD single

No.	Title	Length
1.	"I'll Never Stop" (Radio Edit)	3:07
2.	"I'll Never Stop" (Album Version)	3:26
3.	"Bye Bye Bye" (Teddy Riley's Club Remix)	5:28

UK cassette single

No.	Title	Length
1.	"I'll Never Stop" (Radio Edit)	3:07
2.	"I'll Never Stop" (Instrumental)	3:07
3.	"Bye Bye Bye" (Riprock 'n' Alex G. Club Remix)	4:53

European CD single

No.	Title	Length
1.	"I'll Never Stop" (Radio Edit)	3:07
2.	"I'll Never Stop" (Instrumental)	3:07

European maxi single

No.	Title	Length
1.	"I'll Never Stop" (Radio Edit)	3:07
2.	"I'll Never Stop" (Album Version)	3:26
3.	"I'll Never Stop" (Instrumental)	3:07
4.	"Bye Bye Bye" (Riprock 'n' Alex G. Club Remix)	4:53
5.	"Bye Bye Bye" (Teddy Riley's Club Remix)	5:28

== Credits and personnel ==
Credits adapted from the back cover of "I'll Never Stop".

Recording

- Produced by Kristian Lundin at Cheiron Studios, Stockholm, Sweden
- Vocals recorded by Mike Tucker at Battery Studios, New York City

Personnel

- Kristian Lundin – songwriter, producer
- Max Martin – songwriter
- Alexander Kronlund – songwriter
- Mike Tucker – vocal recording engineer
- Chaz Harper – mastering
- Chris Haggerty – digital editing

== Charts ==
=== Weekly charts ===
Weekly chart performance for "I'll Never Stop"
Chart (2000)	Peak position
Belgium (Ultratop 50 Flanders)	44
Belgium (Ultratip Bubbling Under Wallonia)	17
Czech Republic (IFPI)	11
El Salvador (El Siglo de Torreón)	1
Europe (Eurochart Hot 100)	31
Europe (European Hit Radio)	19
Germany (GfK)	23
Ireland (IRMA)	32
Latvia (Latvijas Top 30)	8
Netherlands (Dutch Top 40)	14
Netherlands (Single Top 100)	28
Scottish Singles Sales (Official Charts)	15
Spain Airplay (Top 40 Radio)	39
Sweden (Sverigetopplistan)	20
Switzerland (Schweizer Hitparade)	31
UK Singles (Official Charts)	13
UK Indie (Official Charts)	4

=== Year-end charts ===
Year-end chart performance for "I'll Never Stop"
Chart (2000)	Position
Europe (European Hit Radio)	84

== Release history ==
Release dates and formats for "I'll Never Stop"
Region	Date	Format	Label	Ref.
Various	May 2000	Airplay	Jive	
Germany	June 6, 2000	CD single; maxi single	Jive	
United Kingdom	July 10, 2000	CD single; cassette single	Jive	
