= Kim Smith (model) =

American actress

- Modeling information
- Height: 5 ft 9 in (1.75 m)
- Hair color: Brown
- Eye color: Green

Kim Smith is a former American fashion model and actress.

== Early life and education ==
Smith got her big break into modeling when she accompanied a friend to a Model Search of America contest. She was changed from a spectator to a competitor by the head of the contest, and soon after signed with Clipse Management of Dallas. Her face and figure have been featured for Victoria's Secret, Mac and Jac, Abercrombie & Fitch, Harper's Bazaar, and Andrew Marc. She also took part in two of Paul Marciano's Guess campaigns in 2000.

== Career ==
Smith has appeared in several music videos, including NSYNC's "Bye Bye Bye" and "It's Gonna Be Me", Aerosmith's "Girls of Summer" and Maroon 5's "Wake Up Call". She entered the film business in 2002 with a cameo in Van Wilder as comely coed Casey, and followed with a small role in 2004's Catwoman as model Drina.

Smith appeared in the July 2005 issue of Maxim magazine, which was dedicated to American troops serving overseas. Kim posed with American military regalia including dog tags and a camouflage hat; the article and pictures are featured in the Girls of Maxim Gallery. The publication named her #91 in its 2006 list.

In 2007, Smith played a recurring role in the television series Friday Night Lights, based on the book of the same name, about the real-life Permian High School Panthers football team.

== Filmography ==
=== Film ===
Year	Title	Role	Notes
2002	Van Wilder	Casey	
2004	Catwoman	Drina	
2009	Alternative Ending	Model	Short film

=== Television ===
Year	Title	Role	Notes
2007	Friday Night Lights	Lauren Davis	3 episodes
2009	Roommates	Jennifer	Episode: "The Old and the New"
2011	Romantically Challenged	Nina	Episode: "Perry Dates His Assistant" (unaired)

=== Music videos ===
Year	Title	Artist(s)	Ref.
2000	"Bye Bye Bye"	NSYNC	
2000	"It's Gonna Be Me"	NSYNC	
2001	"Want You Bad"	The Offspring	
2002	"Girls of Summer"	Aerosmith	
2007	"Wake Up Call" (Original and Director's Cut versions)	Maroon 5	
