= It's Gonna Be Me =

2000 single by NSYNC

- International cover art. The North American cover art is an animated cartoon of the NSYNC members (not pictured).

Single by NSYNC

from the album No Strings Attached
- B-side: "This Is Where the Party's At"
- Released: May 16, 2000
- Recorded: July 17–18, 1999
- Studio: Battery (New York City); Cheiron (Stockholm, Sweden)
- Genre: Pop
- Length: 3:11
- Label: Jive
- Songwriters: Max Martin; Andreas Carlsson; Rami
- Producer: Rami

NSYNC singles chronology
"Bye Bye Bye" (2000)	"It's Gonna Be Me" (2000)	"I'll Never Stop" (2000)

Music video
- "It's Gonna Be Me" on YouTube

"It's Gonna Be Me" is a song by American boy band NSYNC. It was released through Jive Records, as the second single from their third studio album No Strings Attached (2000) in the United States, and as the third single from the international edition of No Strings Attached. The song was written by Max Martin, Andreas Carlsson, and Rami Yacoub, and produced by the latter. A pop song with a funk and R&B influence, the lyrics are about a man attempting to persuade a woman to start a new relationship together as she recovers from a previous breakup.

"It's Gonna Be Me" debuted on the US Billboard Hot 100 at number 42, where it eventually peaked at number one for two consecutive weeks as their only song to peak at that position on that chart. The song was certified gold by the Recording Industry Association of America (RIAA) one month after its retail release, and was certified platinum by the Australian Recording Industry Association (ARIA) and Music Canada. "It's Gonna Be Me" also peaked at number one in Canada, and charted in the top 10 on the UK Singles Chart, New Zealand, and Sweden music charts.

An accompanying music video, directed by Wayne Isham, debuted on MTV's Making the Video on May 21, 2000, and made its first appearance on Total Request Live on May 23, 2000. It depicts each NSYNC member as a doll inside a toy store, attempting to be bought by a female customer. NSYNC performed the song at the 2000 MTV Movie Awards and 2000 MTV Video Music Awards, and in three headlining concerts. "It's Gonna Be Me" was popularized as an Internet meme titled "It's Gonna Be May", after a Tumblr image of NSYNC member Justin Timberlake was posted by Kianna Davis in 2012 with the respective caption, which gained the attention of Barack Obama and Timberlake himself.

== Background and development ==
In 1999, Max Martin, Andreas Carlsson, and Rami Yacoub went to Key West, Florida, to write another single after NSYNC finished recording "Bye Bye Bye" (2000). After Carlsson whistled the eventual melody of "It's Gonna Be Me", Martin told him to include it in the track. The love triangle in Rupert Holmes' "Him" (1980) and by Joe Jackson's "Steppin' Out" (1982) inspired Carlsson, which influenced the melody of the lyric "You don't want to lose it again, but I'm not like them".

On the weekend of July 17 to 18, 1999, the band recorded vocals for the song at Battery Studios during their break from the NSYNC in Concert tour in New York. They also traveled to Stockholm, Sweden, where they recorded additional vocals in Cheiron Studios. During recording, Martin consciously wanted the lyrics to be sung in a specific way, NSYNC member JC Chasez told Billboard: "ET'S GONNA BAY MAY!" instead of "It's gonna be ME". Rami said Zomba Group founder Clive Calder told Justin Timberlake to over-pronounce the lyric.

== Composition ==
"It's Gonna Be Me" is a pop song, with a funk and R&B influence. According to the sheet music published at Musicnotes.com by Universal Music Publishing Group, it is based on 4/4 common time, has a tempo of 82 beats per minute, and is in the key of C minor. NSYNC's vocal range spans from the low note of F_{4} to the high note of G_{5.} The song is constructed in verse–chorus form. Timberlake performs the lead vocals on the song, elongating the word "me" with a "funkadelicized vibrato". Carlsson compared the way Timberlake sung the note to the Backstreet Boys song "It's Gotta Be You" from their 1999 album Millennium, which the opening line "baby" was pronounced as "Bay-bay" instead of "Bay-bee". He opined that Martin's vocal style originated from his time in the Swedish band It's Alive. NSYNC altered the way each consonant and vowel was pronounced in the song in order to provide it with energy. The letter "l" was specifically emphasized on the word "lose" so that the lyric would be sung as "You don't wanna NLUUSE" instead of "You don't wanna lose".

Instrumentation consisted of a whirring electronic drum, funk-sounding bass guitar, bright halting string instruments, and staccato piano notes. The crashing piano stabs were incorporated in order for the beat to sound harder, while synthesizers were used throughout the electronic-based song. Each tense verse consists of beatbox-sounding vocals, which is followed by a slow escalation into an explosive chorus containing several layered vocals. It then shifts to a five-part harmonized bridge, moves to the post-chorus, "all that I do, is not enough for you," before concluding with a climax that follows the song's quiet-loud-quieter-louder structure. The lyrics of "It's Gonna Be Me" describe a man attempting to persuade a woman to start a new relationship as she recovers from a breakup.

== Critical reception ==
Chuck Taylor wrote in Billboard that "It's Gonna Be Me" was "a finely crafted example of why pop music continues to excel on the top 40 airwaves", stating that the members used constructive layers of harmonization on top of an "avalanche of meaty beats". Sputnikmusic emeritus Morrissey described the song as "captivating in its menacing bent". David Browne of Entertainment Weekly was more critical, stating that "they stretch out words like 'babe' into 'bayyyyb', resulting in unintentional parodies of R&B singing". Anna Rahmanan of Consequence of Sound opined that "It's Gonna Be Me" was catchy, but contained "meaningless yet understandable lyrics" in a formulaic song. Jim Farber wrote in Entertainment Weekly that it was a "screamybop anthem" that represented the "creative bankruptcy of modern pop".

In 2015, Rolling Stone staff ranked it as the 15th-greatest boy band song of all time. They said "the lyric juxtaposes the hesitancy of the song's love interest with the determination of an eager-to-please beau represented by both JC Chasez and Justin Timberlake". Comparing the then-15th anniversary boy band albums No Strings Attached and Black & Blue, Ariana Bacle of Entertainment Weekly ranked "It's Gonna Be Me" as the second-best song behind "The Call" (2000). She wrote that it was the "NSYNC discography's real star", claiming that the "relatively simple melody and Justin's slightly menacing vocals" resulted in "an irresistible three minutes that climaxes with a bridge highlighting the kind of overlapping harmonies that define boy bands". "It's Gonna Be Me" was ranked at number 18 on Billboard's The 100 Greatest Songs of 2000 list, stating that it is "the epitome of a song that endures".

== Commercial performance ==
"It's Gonna Be Me" first appeared on the US Top 40 Tracks chart on the May 6, 2000, issue of Billboard at number 33, after it was distributed as a promotional record. It was then released in continental Europe on June 12, 2000. The song was eventually sent to retail stores in the US on July 11, 2000, after it debuted on the Billboard Hot 100 at number 42 the previous week due to early street-date violations. Consequently, this caused "It's Gonna Be Me" to reach number one on the July 29, 2000, issue, scanning 91,000 units. It was the second song released by Jive Records to reach number one since Britney Spears' "...Baby One More Time" in 1999, as they were one of the only singles to be released on CD and cassette formats.

The song remained at number one on the Hot 100 for two consecutive weeks, charting from the July 29–August 5, 2000, dated issues of Billboard. It was the only number one single released by NSYNC, despite six of their singles appearing in the top 10 of the chart. The song also reached number one on the Mainstream Top 40 after spending eight weeks on the chart, dethroning Spears' "Oops!... I Did It Again" (2000). "It's Gonna Be Me" was certified gold by the Recording Industry Association of America (RIAA) on August 11, 2000, for selling 500,000 copies in the US in just a month of its retail release. In Canada, it debuted at number 18 on the RPM Top 100 Singles chart dated June 5, 2000. The song peaked at number one on the July 10, 2000, issue, replacing "Oops!... I Did It Again" which had then spent 11 weeks on the chart. "It's Gonna Be Me" was certified platinum by Music Canada (MC) on August 31, 2023, for track-equivalent sales of 80,000 units in the country.

"It's Gonna Be Me" bowed on the UK Singles Chart at number nine after charting for 12 weeks. It was certified gold by the British Phonographic Industry (BPI) on December 12, 2025, for selling 400,000 equivalent sales units. On the Swedish Sverigetopplistan chart, the song peaked at number six on August 31, 2000, and remained for 10 weeks before receiving a gold certification for sales of 15,000 equivalent units. It reached the top 20 in Italy, Norway, and Scotland. In Australia, "It's Gonna Be Me" debuted at number 15 on the ARIA Singles Chart on June 25, 2000. It peaked at number 11 and charted for 12 weeks, before receiving a platinum certification by the Australian Recording Industry Association (ARIA) for shipping over 70,000 equivalent units. The song peaked at number seven on the New Zealand Singles Chart after charting for 19 weeks, where it was certified gold by Recorded Music NZ (RMNZ) for track-equivalent sales of 5,000 units in the country.

== Music video ==
=== Background and development ===
The music video for "It's Gonna Be Me" was directed by Wayne Isham, and filmed from April 26 to 28, 2000, in Los Angeles Center Studios, with additional footage shot at Play Co. Toys on Soledad Canyon Road in Canyon Country, Santa Clarita, California. NSYNC decided to expand upon the puppet motif used in their album No Strings Attached by being portrayed as dolls that fight other toys in a toy store. Isham visited Play Co. Toys, which he duplicated by creating multiple shelves on the set that formed a regular shelf. The store was chosen by a production company scouting for stores, as it provided the film crew with more freedom to rearrange and dismantle objects. Isham decided to bring back model Kim Smith from the "Bye Bye Bye" music video to link the two.

The music video used limited computer-generated imagery (CGI) as Isham wanted it to appear authentic. Life-sized dominoes were used, which were shot falling across the floor. Isham asked San Francisco-based effects house company Radium to create the dolls with CGI, but the company said it could not complete the job by the given deadline. Instead, makeup artist Screaming Mad George used prosthetic makeup to transform NSYNC into dolls in six hours. The band kept the makeup on for 24 hours, including 22 hours of shooting. Estee Stanley was the video's stylist.

NSYNC then placed against a green screen at the suggestion of Isham, after he saw a Slim Jim advertisement. The band were filmed at 12 frames per second, on a base of 24, to make them resemble dolls animated by stop-motion. Consequently, both the song and dancing members needed to perform at half speed due to mathematical problems, which was also attributed to the set scaled 7.2 times larger than the real world. During the scene when the dolls are scanned at the checkout counter and reverted to human size, several shots of each member were superimposed in front of a green screen, which was animated by Radium through the use of Inferno steadily growing each doll back up to human height. The company also assisted in creating digital effects using Inferno, such as the constant "morph zooms" used to move between scenes. The music video debuted on MTV's Making the Video on May 21, 2000, and made its first appearance on Total Request Live on May 23, 2000.

=== Synopsis ===
Each NSYNC member portrays plastic dolls while wearing prosthetic makeup, as they appear on a set scaled 7.2 times larger than the real world

The music video begins in a toy store, with the "Bye Bye Bye" introduction faintly playing in the background. Each NSYNC member portrays an animated plastic doll version of themselves, as they are trapped inside of a display box. They punch through the plastic sleeve on their boxes and attempt to gain the attention of a woman in the store so that they can be bought. Army men abseil from a taller shelf, where they destroy NSYNC's boxes and goad them to fight. The army men remain standing and laugh at the dolls when they are purchased, giving them a mocking salute at their expense.

The NSYNC dolls are invited by a group of female dolls to party at their display, but this was a ruse and they become trapped underneath a net thrown onto them. The NSYNC dolls are again teased when the female dolls are scanned.

Joey Fatone accidentally knocks down a stack of dominoes forming the band's logo, before the NSYNC dolls frantically run atop the shelf when they notice the same woman walking past their section earlier. They quickly abseil inside the shelf and perform the song's dance choreography for her, quickly gaining her affection. She purchases the dolls, which upon being scanned become life-sized versions of each member. The Justin Timberlake doll knocks down the remaining NSYNC dolls behind him on the shelf, as the life-sized members walk out of the toy store alongside the woman.

The plot scenes are intercut with video of the real-life NSYNC members performing a choreographed dance routine in a strobe-lit dome.

=== Reception ===
The music video for "It's Gonna Be Me" reached the top position on Total Request Live several times from May to September 2000, which also included the "End of Summer" special and the countdown for the 500th episode. It won Best Makeup in a Music Video at the 10th Annual Music Video Production Association (MVPA) Music Video Awards on May 16, 2001, which was attributed to makeup artists Screaming Mad George and Elan Bonglorno. In addition, it received the awards for Choice Music Video and Choice Summer Song at the 2000 Teen Choice Awards. In 2017, viewership on YouTube garnered five times as many daily views on April 30 as they did in mid-April, seven times as many searches, and 23% more views across all NSYNC music videos, in reference to how Timberlake's lyrics sound like "It's gonna be May". The music video has also consistently received the most traffic on April 30 each year.

== Live performances ==
NSYNC debuted the live performance of "It's Gonna Be Me" at the 2000 MTV Movie Awards, which was described by MTV.com as "mega-explodo". Billboard editor Carla Hay stated that "the tightly choreographed performance" elicited "the most enthusiastic response from the audience". They also performed an uptempo remix of the song at the 2000 MTV Video Music Awards as a medley with "This I Promise You" and "Bye Bye Bye"; the latter included a video-head breakdown with their bodies dancing in time with their heads displayed on the five big screens. Each member performed a quick costume change from the previous song "Bye Bye Bye", wearing leather outfits with few sleeves and a parachute vest. "It's Gonna Be Me" was remixed and re-choreographed with a rap introduction, and included a planned momentary pause from Joey Fatone after pausing halfway through the performance to regain his breath.

NSYNC performed "It's Gonna Be Me" on several television programs worldwide throughout 2000, such as Good Morning America and The Rosie O'Donnell Show in the United States, and Top of the Pops in the United Kingdom. When the band appeared on Japanese music television show Pop Jam, Ultraman posed with them onstage during an interview segment before they performed the song. During the Super Bowl XXXV halftime show on January 28, 2001, NSYNC performed "It's Gonna Be Me" as part of a back-and-forth medley with Aerosmith. The members wore outfits containing pyrotechnics sparking out from their hands, before Aerosmith lead singer Steven Tyler screamed the last line of the chorus. Adam Graham of The Detroit News wrote that the halftime performance "made a lasting impression" with its blend of teen pop, classic rock, comedy and celebrity cameos in comparison to other performances.

NSYNC performed "It's Gonna Be Me" on the No Strings Attached Tour, which was praised for its production. The song was also included on PopOdyssey, where each band member rode go-karts, shot Nerf guns, and played with several over-sized toys. Five female dancers appeared on the stage littered with giant crayons, blue bouncing balls, scooters and red wagons, while Lance Bass entered with a stuffed bear attached to him. On the Celebrity Tour, "It's Gonna Be Me" was performed with its full dance choreography near the beginning of each concert following "Do Your Thing" and "Bye Bye Bye".

== In popular culture ==
Throughout "It's Gonna Be Me", Justin Timberlake pronounces the word "me" such that it sounds more like "May," particularly at the conclusion of the song. A Tumblr user first posted an image of Timberlake with the words "It's Gonna Be May" captioned underneath on January 29, 2012. The meme eventually caught on across the internet, which became an annually recurring joke throughout the month of April. It was acknowledged by former United States president Barack Obama, morning television show Good Morning America, and Timberlake himself. The latter explained in an interview that Martin had him pronounce the word to sound like he was from Tennessee. To mark the song's twentieth anniversary in 2020, it was temporarily renamed "It's Gonna Be Me (It's Gonna Be May)" on digital platforms such as Spotify and Apple Music.

American rock band Fall Out Boy released a third music video for their song "Irresistible" on January 5, 2016, which featured American singer Demi Lovato, and was also directed by Isham. It contained cameos from NSYNC members Chris Kirkpatrick as an assembly line worker and Fatone as a toy store employee. On the March 1, 2018, episode of Lip Sync Battle, Puerto Rican singer Luis Fonsi performed a lip sync of "It's Gonna Be Me" while competing against Joan Smalls. He impersonated Timberlake by wearing a blonde curly wig, and performed the song's dance choreography. NSYNC's official Twitter page retweeted the performance among other memes of the song on April 30, 2019, with Christian Allaire of Vogue acknowledging that the band fully embraced the meme.

American television series Supergirl played "It's Gonna Be Me" in "The Bottle Episode", the 2020 tenth episode of its fifth season, where critics questioned the song's appropriateness in its accompanying "bar fight" scene. American rock band All Time Low interpolated the chorus of "It's Gonna Be Me" in the song "Clumsy", which is included in their eighth studio album Wake Up, Sunshine (2020). Lead vocalist Alex Gaskarth acknowledged that he accidentally added the "oscillating melody" into the pre-chorus, although he intended to include a pop reference. "It's Gonna Be Me" is used in the first trailer for American animated film Turning Red (2022), which Gizmodo writer Charles Pulliam-Moore opined that the song's inclusion piqued his interest in the film.

== Track listings ==
US limited edition cassette and CD single

No.	Title	Length
1.	"It's Gonna Be Me" (Album Version)	3:11
2.	"It's Gonna Be Me" (Maurice Joshua Remix (Radio Edit))	4:11

US 12-inch single

Side A
No.	Title	Length
1.	"It's Gonna Be Me" (Digital Black-N-Groove Club Mix)	8:05
2.	"It's Gonna Be Me" (Digital Black-N-Dub)	5:15

Side B
No.	Title	Length
1.	"It's Gonna Be Me" (Azza's Groove Mix)	3:45
2.	"It's Gonna Be Me" (Maurice's Radio Edit)	4:11
3.	"It's Gonna Be Me" (Jack D. Elliot Remix (Radio Edit))	3:45

Remixes maxi single

No.	Title	Length
1.	"It's Gonna Be Me" (Single Version)	3:11
2.	"It's Gonna Be Me" (Jack D. Elliot Remix (Radio Edit))	3:47
3.	"It's Gonna Be Me" (Digital Black-N-Groove Club Mix)	8:05
4.	"It's Gonna Be Me" (Azza's Groove Mix)	3:45
5.	"It's Gonna Be Me" (Jazzy Jim's Remix)	3:47
6.	"It's Gonna Be Me" (Jack D. Elliot Remix)	6:02
7.	"It's Gonna Be Me" (Digital Black-N-Dub)	5:15

European CD single

No.	Title	Length
1.	"It's Gonna Be Me"	3:11
2.	"It's Gonna Be Me" (Instrumental)	3:11

International maxi single

No.	Title	Length
1.	"It's Gonna Be Me"	3:11
2.	"It's Gonna Be Me" (Instrumental)	3:11
3.	"This Is Where the Party's At"	3:39
4.	"Bye Bye Bye" (Teddy Riley Remix)	3:40

== Credits and personnel ==
Credits are adapted from the back cover of "It's Gonna Be Me".

Recording

- Recorded at Cheiron Studios in Stockholm, Sweden, and Battery Studios in New York City, U.S.

Personnel

- Max Martin – songwriter
- Rami – songwriter, producer
- Andreas Carlsson – songwriter
- Chris Trevett – recording engineer
- Charles McCrorey – assistant engineer
- John Amatiello – Pro Tools engineer
- Justin Timberlake – human beat box
- Chaz Harper – mastering

== Charts ==
=== Weekly charts ===
Weekly chart performance for "It's Gonna Be Me"
Chart (2000–2001)	Peak position
Australia (ARIA)	11
Austria (Ö3 Austria Top 40)	40
Belgium (Ultratip Bubbling Under Flanders)	2
Belgium (Ultratip Bubbling Under Wallonia)	9
Canada Top Singles (RPM)	1
Canada Adult Contemporary (RPM)	27
Croatia International (HRT) (Note: Only a partial archive of the Croatian chart is available so it is possible that the single had a higher peak.)	8
El Salvador (Notimex)	5
Europe (Eurochart Hot 100)	27
Europe (European Hit Radio)	18
Germany (GfK)	37
Ireland (IRMA)	23
Italy (FIMI)	13
Italy (Musica e dischi)	27
Netherlands (Dutch Top 40)	28
Netherlands (Single Top 100)	30
New Zealand (Recorded Music NZ)	7
Norway (VG-lista)	11
Scottish Singles Sales (Official Charts)	11
Spain Airplay (Top 40 Radio)	16
Sweden (Sverigetopplistan)	6
Switzerland (Schweizer Hitparade)	39
UK Singles (Official Charts)	9
UK Airplay (Music Week)	46
UK Independent (Official Charts)	2
US Billboard Hot 100	1
US Adult Pop Airplay (Billboard)	28
US Dance Singles Sales (Billboard)	33
US Pop Airplay (Billboard)	1
US Rhythmic Airplay (Billboard)	7

=== Year-end charts ===
Year-end chart performance for "It's Gonna Be Me"
Chart (2000)	Position
Australia (ARIA)	55
Brazil (Crowley)	89
Europe (European Hit Radio)	73
New Zealand (RIANZ)	31
Sweden (Hitlistan)	75
UK Singles (OCC)	200
US Billboard Hot 100	27
US Mainstream Top 40 (Billboard)	5
US Rhythmic Top 40 (Billboard)	25

== Certifications ==
Certifications for "It's Gonna Be Me"
Region	Certification	Certified units/sales
Australia (ARIA)	Platinum	70,000^{^}
Canada (Music Canada)	Platinum	80,000^{‡}
Denmark (IFPI Danmark)	Gold	45,000^{‡}
New Zealand (RMNZ)	Platinum	30,000^{‡}
Sweden (GLF)	Gold	15,000^{^}
United Kingdom (BPI)	Gold	400,000^{‡}
United States (RIAA)	3× Platinum	3,000,000^{‡}
^{^} Shipments figures based on certification alone.^{‡} Sales+streaming figures based on certification alone.

== Release history ==
Release dates and formats for "It's Gonna Be Me"
Country	Date	Format(s)	Label(s)	Ref.
United States	May 16, 2000	Contemporary hit radio; rhythmic contemporary radio	Jive	
Europe	June 12, 2000	CD single	Jive	
Japan	June 21, 2000	CD single	Avex Trax; Jive	
United States	July 11, 2000	Cassette single; CD single	Jive	
United Kingdom	September 4, 2000	Cassette single; CD single	Jive	
