= Music of My Heart =

1999 single by Gloria Estefan and NSYNC

Single by Gloria Estefan and NSYNC

from the album Music of the Heart: Original Motion Picture Soundtrack
- Released: August 2, 1999
- Genre: Teen pop
- Length: 4:31
- Label: Epic, Sony Music Soundtrax
- Songwriter: Diane Warren
- Producer: David Foster

Gloria Estefan singles chronology
"Santo Santo" (1999)	"Music of My Heart" (1999)	"No Me Dejes de Querer" (2000)

NSYNC singles chronology
"Thinking of You (I Drive Myself Crazy)" (1999)	"Music of My Heart" (1999)	"Bye Bye Bye" (2000)

Music video
- "Music of My Heart" on YouTube

"Music of My Heart" is a song by Cuban-American recording artist Gloria Estefan and American boy band NSYNC. The teen pop song was written by Diane Warren and produced by David Foster, for the Wes Craven-directed movie of a similar name (1999). It was released as the first single from the soundtrack on August 2, 1999, through Miramax Records and Epic Records.

The song peaked at number two on the US Billboard Hot 100 chart in 1999. The single was certified gold by the Recording Industry Association of America (RIAA) in the United States for sales of 500,000 copies. "Music of My Heart" won the Billboard Music Award for Top Song from a Movie, and the Blockbuster Award for Best Pop Song in a Movie. It was also nominated for an Academy Award for Best Original Song, as well as Grammy Awards for Best Song Written for a Motion Picture and Best Pop Collaboration with Vocals.

== Background and composition ==
"Music of My Heart" was written by Diane Warren and produced by David Foster, for the Wes Craven-directed movie Music of the Heart (1999). Gloria Estefan and band NSYNC recorded their vocals for the song in 1999. It was released as the first single from the movie soundtrack on September 28, 1999. The song was originally offered to rival group the Backstreet Boys, but originally rejected, and was offered to NSYNC instead. "Music of My Heart" is a teen pop song that lasts for four minutes and thirty-one seconds. The song is composed in the key of B major later changing to the key of D♭ major and is set in time signature of 4/4 common time, with a moderately slow tempo of 68 beats per minute. According to the sheet music published at Musicnotes.com by Universal Music Publishing Group, the vocal range of Estefan and the members of NSYNC spans over an octave, from F♯_{3} to B_{4} and late D♭_{5}.

== Music video ==
The video, directed by Nigel Dick, features NSYNC and Gloria Estefan singing in Miami High School in Miami with interspersed shots of student musicians.

== Track listings ==
US and European CD1

1. "Music of My Heart" (album version) – 4:31
2. "Music of My Heart" (Hex Hector 7-inch remix) – 4:18

US and European CD2

1. "Music of My Heart" (album version) – 4:31
2. "Music of My Heart" (Pablo Flores club mix) – 10:06
3. "Music of My Heart" (Pablo Flores radio edit) – 4:42

UK CD1

1. "Music of My Heart" (album version) – 4:31
2. "Music of My Heart" (Lawrence Dermer Remix) – 4:21
3. "Music of My Heart" (Hex Hector 12-inch club mix) – 9:20

UK CD2

1. "Music of My Heart" (album version) – 4:31
2. "Music of My Heart" (Hex Hector 7-inch radio edit) – 4:18
3. "Music of My Heart" (Pablo Flores club mix) – 10:06

== Charts ==
=== Weekly charts ===
Chart (1999–2000)	Peak position
Australia (ARIA)	112
Belgium (Ultratip Bubbling Under Flanders)	16
Canada (Nielsen SoundScan)	7
Canada Top Singles (RPM)	30
Canada Adult Contemporary (RPM)	8
Europe (Eurochart Hot 100)	95
Netherlands (Dutch Top 40 Tipparade)	3
Netherlands (Single Top 100)	58
Scottish Singles Sales (Official Charts)	35
Spain (Promusicae)	11
Spain Airplay (Top 40 Radio)	15
UK Singles (Official Charts)	34
US Billboard Hot 100	2
US Adult Contemporary (Billboard)	2
US Pop Airplay (Billboard)	21
US Rhythmic Airplay (Billboard)	23

=== Year-end charts ===
Chart (1999)	Position
Canada Adult Contemporary (RPM)	51
US Billboard Hot 100	97
US Adult Contemporary (Billboard)	24
US Mainstream Top 40 (Billboard)	89
US Rhythmic Top 40 (Billboard)	88

Chart (2000)	Position
US Adult Contemporary (Billboard)	18

== Certifications ==
Region	Certification	Certified units/sales
United States (RIAA)	Gold	500,000

== Release history ==
Region	Date	Format(s)	Label(s)	Ref(s).
United States	August 2, 1999	Adult contemporary; hot adult contemporary; modern adult contemporary radio	Epic; Sony Music Soundtrax	
United States	August 3, 1999	Rhythmic contemporary; contemporary hit radio	Epic; Sony Music Soundtrax	
United States	September 28, 1999	CD; cassette	Epic; Sony Music Soundtrax	
Germany	December 7, 1999	CD single	Epic	
United Kingdom	December 27, 1999	CD single	Epic	
