= No Strings Attached (NSYNC album) =

2000 studio album by NSYNC

Studio album by NSYNC
- Released: March 21, 2000
- Recorded: February 1999–January 28, 2000
- Studios: Battery (New York, New York); Cheiron (Stockholm, Sweden); Cove City (Orlando, Florida); The Treehouse (North Hollywood, California); Westlake (Los Angeles, California)
- Genres: Pop; R&B; dance-pop; teen pop
- Length: 47:10
- Label: Jive
- Producers: Kevin Antunes; Babyface; Kevin "She'kspere" Briggs; JC Chasez; Riprock 'n' Alex G.; Kristian Lundin; Richard Marx; Rami Yacoub; Veit Renn; Teddy Riley; Guy Roche; Jake Schulze; Justin Timberlake

NSYNC chronology
| The Winter Album (1998) | No Strings Attached (2000) | Celebrity (2001) |

Singles from No Strings Attached
- 1. "Bye Bye Bye" Released: January 17, 2000; 2. "It's Gonna Be Me" Released: May 16, 2000; 3. "I'll Never Stop" Released: May 30, 2000; 4. "This I Promise You" Released: September 19, 2000

No Strings Attached is the third studio album by American boy band NSYNC. It was released by Jive Records on March 21, 2000, after several delays due to legal battles. Seeking to distinguish their music from others', NSYNC chose to incorporate pop and R&B styles. Before the release of the album, the band separated from their management, Trans Continental, and their label RCA Records; its title is a play on the idea of independence from corporate control. Contributions to the album's production came from a wide range of producers, including NSYNC members Justin Timberlake and JC Chasez, and collaborators including Kristian Lundin, Jake Schulze, Rami, Teddy Riley, Kevin "She'kspere" Briggs, Richard Marx, Veit Renn, Babyface, and Guy Roche.

No Strings Attached received generally favorable reviews from music critics, many of whom praised the production. The album debuted atop the US Billboard 200 chart with first-week sales of 2.4 million copies, setting the record for one-week sales in the country; a record that remained for 15 years until Adele surpassed the first-week sales record with her third studio album 25 (2015). Four singles were released from the album. Its lead single "Bye Bye Bye" is credited with creating the hype for the album's eventual landmark success, while "It's Gonna Be Me" became their only number-one on the Billboard Hot 100. No Strings Attached was the best-selling album of 2000. NSYNC promoted the album through the No Strings Attached Tour in 2000, which was the second-highest-grossing tour in North America of that year.

No Strings Attached was considered to be the peak of the teen pop genre, as CDs were beginning to be phased out in favor of peer-to-peer file sharing software such as Napster and LimeWire, as well as trends shifting away from the genre, beginning with the Backstreet Boys' album Black & Blue (2000). NSYNC were considered to be influential in crossing over music genres, which helped distinguish themselves from the Backstreet Boys, and inspire other boy bands to experiment with different genres of music while expressing their originality. The album has sold over 14 million copies worldwide.

== Background ==
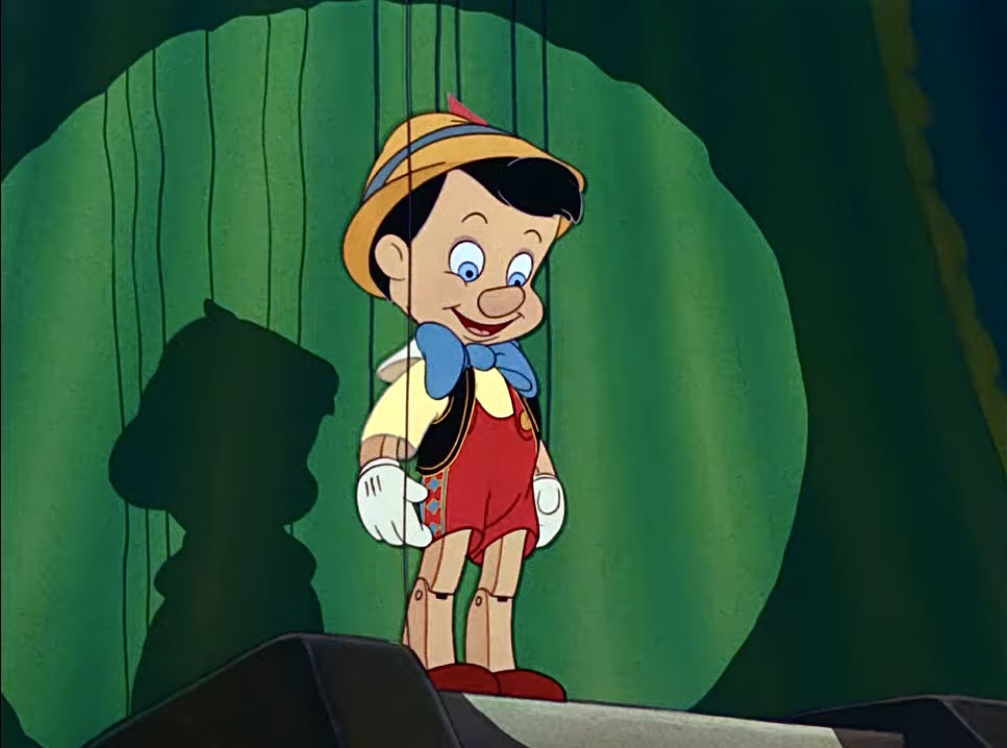
The album was inspired by the song "I've Got No Strings" from Pinocchio, following the lawsuit between Lou Pearlman and BMG

The title of the album alludes to puppets and the idea of independence NSYNC earned following a legal battle between its then-management. NSYNC was signed by Trans Continental Management to Bertelsmann Music Group (BMG) in Germany, due to a pre-existing deal, and its distribution rights in the United States were automatically bought by RCA. In 1999, NSYNC sued Trans Continental and financier, Louis J. Pearlman, due to illicit corporate practices. They cited Pearlman's defrauding the group, which, according to MTV, was more than fifty percent of their earnings, rather than his promise of only receiving one-sixth of the profits. The band, whose self-titled debut album and follow up had commercial success, insisted "they have not seen enough of the profits" that they had generated by selling eight million albums in the United States alone. On October 12, 1999, Trans Continental, along with RCA's parent, BMG Entertainment, filed a $195 million suit in a federal court to bar NSYNC's transference to Jive and from performing or recording under their current name, as well as forcing them to return their master recordings from 1999 in preparation for their second album.

With an undisclosed settlement in 2000, NSYNC severed their recording contract with Trans Continental and switched labels from RCA Records to Jive Records, which included artists such as the Backstreet Boys and Britney Spears. Jive immediately requested that the album was to be sold to retailers in March, which caused Pearlman and BMG to file a $150 million breach-of-contract suit and an injunction to stop them. NSYNC filed a countersuit in response, with member JC Chasez calling Pearlman "an unscrupulous, greedy and sophisticated businessman who posed as an unselfish, loving father figure and took advantage of our trust". The judge, Anne C. Conway rejected Pearlman and BMG's injunction, stating that "the defendants have raised serious questions [...] about Mr. Pearlman and his dealings".

The album's title was thought of by member Chris Kirkpatrick during a car ride in London after the settlement, where they were inspired by the song "I've Got No Strings" from the 1940 film, Pinocchio. The titling of the album is similar to the Backstreet Boys' who also had legal wrangling with Pearlman which concluded to a settlement in October 1998 that was not disclosed; the Backstreet Boys "took a shot" at Pearlman by titling their 2000 studio album, Black & Blue. Meanwhile, the title No Strings Attached was announced in September 1999, during when the legal battle was still ongoing. Kirkpatrick revealed that the title and the album's cover art have a personal meaning to them. According to him, the album was designed to show that they felt they were puppets stranded on strings, which alludes to their destiny being controlled. In an interview, he further explained the relationship of the strings to the album, stating that "the only reasons that the strings are still attached on the album is so people can get the whole feel of the vibe of [...] No Strings Attached".

== Recording and production ==
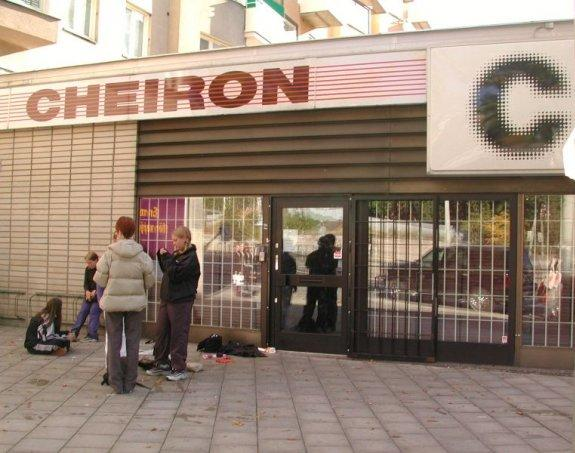
Some of the songwriters and producers for the album including Max Martin came from Cheiron Studios in Stockholm, Sweden.

While the legal suit was underway, NSYNC continued to record songs for the album. The majority of the songs recorded were without the support of a record label, which meant that the band was able to freely select which songs would make the cut. However, several producers were unwilling to work with the group, as they weren't sent to them via a record label. Despite the band switching labels, they still retained their manager and mentor from Trans Continental, Johnny Wright, and stayed at his ranch in Orlando, Florida. Through Jive, the band was introduced to American record producer Teddy Riley, who would remake Johnny Kemp's 1988 "Just Got Paid" with them, and Kevin "She'kspere" Briggs, who produced "It Makes Me Ill" for the album. One of the recording sessions for the album took place in a tiny studio in Burbank. Recording of "Just Got Paid" pushed the album's in-store release date of March 7, 2000, to the new date of March 21, 2000. The ballad "That's When I'll Stop Loving You", written by Diane Warren, was recorded there under the production of French-born producer Guy Roche in 1999.

Accordingly, NSYNC insisted that they choose producers and songwriters for the album. On No Strings Attached, the band commissioned Swedish and German songwriters and producers, who had produced songs for the Backstreet Boys. Aside from getting a number-one album on the chart, the group wanted to distinguish their music from the style of the Backstreet Boys, with whom they had shared the same producers. To that end, they told the Swedish team of Cheiron Studios to change the band's tune. Wright recalls, "We basically told them, 'We like your concepts for songs and we love the way you produce. But you're gonna have to do it in a different way so that it conforms to how we want our sound to be." This direction resulted to harder-edge songs such as "Bye Bye Bye", which production was handled by the Swedish team. Max Martin, who also came from Cheiron and was known for producing songs for NSYNC's label mates, also contributed to the album by co-writing the single "It's Gonna Be Me". Martin was initially hesitant to provide the group his music due to the ongoing lawsuit, but relented when Wright pleaded for him to allow NSYNC to perform them at the Radio Music Awards, indicating that it could be the final time fans could see them perform.

Despite the new direction the band had wanted to take, the early recording process found some of the producers and writers submitting tracks which were "in the vein of NSYNC's earlier, softer sound". The band thought that if the collaborators could not produce what they were looking for, they would find it themselves. This resulted in some of the band members contributing to a number of tracks on the album. On specific songs, songwriter and producer Veit Renn collaborated with band member JC Chasez, who co-authored the album's title track and three other songs. Meanwhile, Justin Timberlake helped pen and produce the album's track "I'll Be Good for You". Lastly, another song that made the record was "Digital Get Down", a song about videophone sex that TV Guide described as "hailing the joys of cybersex. Do they think the braces brigade in 'N Sync's audience will recognize the R-rated oomph?"

== Music and lyrics ==
Timberlake said that the album is a diverse body of work that explores dimensions of R&B within pop music. He added that the album "goes totally mainstream and it goes into some dance- and club-style songs". There are few mid-tempo songs and ballads on No Strings Attached, a result of the band's desire to have a "fun" album. The album did, however, retain the pop style of its predecessor. According to Entertainment Weekly, the album's musical style is that of Top 40, with a funky beat, while Billboard described it as "Millennial interpretations of New Jack Swing, and staccato rap-adjacent flows that were previously made mainstream by Destiny's Child and TLC". Chasez also stated that the album is "in your face", comparing the album's "chopped and punched" production to the discography of Michael Jackson.

In his article for The New York Times, Jon Pareles wrote in 2000:

Flush with artistic freedom, 'N Sync heads straight for the past: specifically the 1980s rhythm-and-blues that sought to balance pretty melody atop hip-hop's street-level beat. Like the Rolling Stones discovering 1950s Chicago blues, 'N Sync has latched onto the highly synthesized, jigsaw rhythms of 1980s phenomena from Michael Jackson to New Edition to Zapp. In a direct tribute to the new jack swing of the 1980s, 'N Sync remakes Johnny Kemp's 1988 hit "Just Got Paid" with its original producer, Teddy Riley.

Writing about No Strings Attached, music critics noted that the song "Digital Get Down" is about video cybersex, which is a clear indicator of post-pubescent consciousness of the group. In the article "Parents' Guide" published in Entertainment Weekly, Lois Alter Mark analyzed the contents of new albums during the time, stating that the album's recurring theme is about puppy love, and has sexual content that is categorized as mildly suggestive and a language that is preteen friendly. Rolling Stone described the "futuristic synth-driven" song as "an eruption of hormones and harmonies all at once, with three and a half minutes of big beats and grown-up innuendo". The European album edition's second single "I'll Never Stop" is considered by Al Shipley of Billboard to closely resemble the band's Europop sounding debut album, while "I'll Be Good For You" is a soulful track that samples "Believe in Love" by Teddy Pendergrass. Both "Space Cowboy (Yippie-Yi-Yay)" and "It Makes Me Ill" were considered by Al Shipley of Billboard as deep-cut songs which attracted "the young fans who made teen pop into a cottage industry", noting that Ariana Grande, an "attentive student of early 2000s pop/R&B crossover", quoted the lyrics of the latter on the Billboard Hot 100 number two single "Break Up with Your Girlfriend, I'm Bored". NSYNC was also inspired by the hip-hop genre, incorporating beat-box type vocals in "It's Gonna Be Me", semi-rapping in "Just Got Paid", and percussion in "Bringin' Da Noise".

== Promotion ==
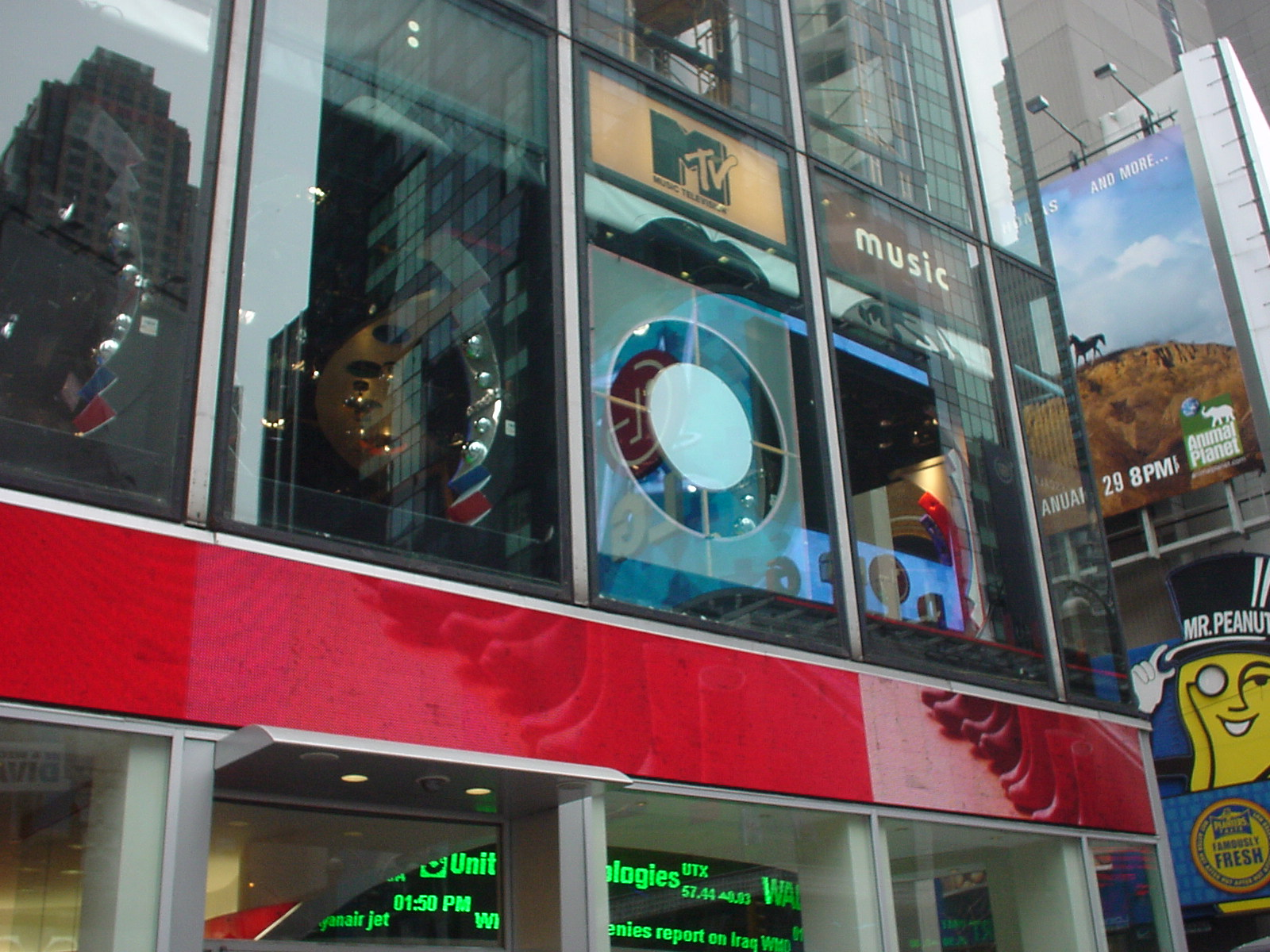
NSYNC made multiple appearances on Total Request Live to promote the album, including on its release date.

No Strings Attached was initially planned for release from September to November 1999. However, because of the ongoing legal battle between NSYNC and its management, the album was delayed several times, which included a release on November 16. This caused fan interest in the album to grow, as coverage of the lawsuit was televised on MTV. Towards the end of 1999, it was reported that a settlement had been reached, putting aside the lawsuit that their management had filed. The settlement allowed the band to freely release the album under their current name with a release date set for March 7, 2000. "Bye Bye Bye" was distributed to radio stations on January 17, 2000, the same night NSYNC performed the song at the American Music Awards of 2000.

No Strings Attached was initially scheduled to be released in stores on March 7, 2000, but NSYNC decided to record "Just Got Paid" with Teddy Riley, which delayed the album to March 21, 2000. NSYNC made several media appearances prior to its release, including on MTV, Good Morning America, Saturday Night Live, and the Oscars. They also appeared on several advertisements for Verizon Wireless and Chili's, where they promoted the release date. The "Bye Bye Bye" music video was heavily rotated, which Richard Skanse of Rolling Stone described as "seemingly every other half-hour" on MTV. Former MTV chairman and CEO Tom Freston praised NSYNC's accessibility to cater towards audiences by using "heavy video rotation [and] mini-biographies" in addition to backstage studio environments including "the Super Bowl [and] Total Request Live (TRL)".

We attempted to open at 11 [for normal business], but when we opened the doors, the crowd rushed in and crashed through the barricades, so we closed down and let a couple of hundred in a few at a time.

— Former Virgin regional manager Andy Moreno on the release of No Strings Attached at the Virgin Megastore in Times Square.

Before its release, tracks from No Strings Attached were leaked on the internet. The leaks were perceived by Wright to assist NSYNC in reaching the sales record that held by the album, describing it as an opportunity for the listeners to hear more than what the radio was playing. No commercial singles for any song were distributed before the release of No Strings Attached to increase demand. On the album's release date, NSYNC appeared on Good Morning America in the morning, where their performance was broadcast on the jumbotron in Times Square. They appeared on TRL in the afternoon, then walked over to the Virgin Megastore, where they were greeted by 8,000 fans, 250 who slept outside overnight. The store underestimated the volume of people who would appear, forcing them to close down twice in the same day; firstly to let a few hundred in at a time, then to prepare for NSYNC's meet-and-greet that evening. Former Virgin regional manager Andy Moreno attributed the influx of people at the store to the Internet, as they heard about the event through chat rooms and websites.

=== No Strings Attached Tour ===
NSYNC embarked on their second tour titled the No Strings Attached Tour in support of the album, which was sponsored by MCY.com and Nabisco, and produced by SFX Touring. One million tickets were sold during the first day of availability, with all 50 initial dates sold out. It began at the Mississippi Coast Coliseum in Biloxi, Mississippi on May 9, 2000. When the tour ended in December 2000, it became the second highest-grossing tour in North America that year, earning more than $70 million. The concerts at Madison Square Garden were filmed for a HBO special that attracted over six million viewers, becoming one of the highest rated concert specials on the network. The special was released as the DVD/VHS Live from Madison Square Garden on November 21, 2000.

== Critical reception ==
Professional ratings
Review scores
| Source | Rating |
|---|---|
| AllMusic | 4/5 stars |
| Christgau's Consumer Guide | (1-star Honorable Mention) |
| Consequence of Sound | A− |
| Entertainment Weekly | C− |
| The Rolling Stone Album Guide | 3/5 stars |
| Sputnikmusic | 3/5 |

No Strings Attached received generally favorable reviews from music critics. AllMusic writer Stephen Thomas Erlewine stated that NSYNC "might sound the same as ever" to critics, but acknowledged that No Strings Attached "blows away their previous record". He added that it "pulls away from the standard dance-pop formula". Pareles compared the band's vocals to groups such as Boyz II Men, Jodeci, and Dru Hill, but praised Chasez's collaborations for showing hints of "nuttiness" and creativity. Robert Christgau gave the album a one-star honorable mention and defined the beats as "their statement, the ballads their way of life". Sputnikmusic emeritus Morrissey opined that No Strings Attached contained "few outstanding pop tracks, and little to no filler" but described the overall album as "enjoyable from start to finish". Writing for Entertainment Weekly, David Browne criticized the album for being "overstuffed with tracks clearly concocted with the concert stage in mind" and described the tracks as "synthetic-funk spectacles", but praised the group's best performances on the album for "arriv[ing] only when they drop the pretenses". Browne's album rating was received poorly by NSYNC fans, with one fan describing his review as "totally uncool" in their letter to Entertainment Weekly in April 2000.

No Strings Attached was nominated in the category for Best Pop Vocal Album at the 43rd Annual Grammy Awards. At the 2000 Billboard Music Awards, the album led NSYNC to receive four awards in categories such as Album of the Year and Top 40 Artist of the Year.

== Commercial performance ==
Many retailers around the United States had predicted that, "with an impressive show of sales strength", No Strings Attached could "culminate into the biggest first week ever in the SoundScan era". Jive Records had already shipped 9.2 million units of the album, and reorders were already made shortly after the album's release in record stores. At online retailer Amazon, advance sales for the album were the biggest at the time. Meanwhile, orders for the album were aggressive on the West Coast. Some stores stayed open until midnight specifically for the album. According to Pareles, the sales of No Strings Attached were "a tribute to Jive Records' skill at building anticipation" for the album. The strength of its lead single and music video, "Bye Bye Bye", and Internet song previews for the album provided the build-up. Both Jive Records and the band's management credited the album's early success to the anticipation amassed over the two years since they released their self-titled debut album, the highly publicized legal battle, and the media blitz leading up to the release. Despite the mania that No Strings Attached stirred in the wake of its debut, MTV reported the "record week may not have been simply the result of a wide fan base and effective marketing". Several NSYNC fans bought numerous copies of the album "to have more than one" and with the intent for NSYNC to "break the Backstreet Boys' sales record", as their second studio album Millennium, sold more than 1.13 million copies in its first week in 1999.

No Strings Attached sold over 2.4 million copies in the United States in its first week, setting a record for the most copies of an album sold in a single week and becoming the first album to sell more than two million copies in a week since the chart adopted Nielsen SoundScan tracking in May 1991. This record was later recognized at the 2000 Billboard Music Awards. The album held the record for 15 years, until it was surpassed by Adele's third studio album 25 in 2015, which sold 3.38 million copies in its first week. The figures surpassed the album's successor Celebrity's debut sales of over 1.88 million units, retaining the recognition as NSYNC's highest-debut in their career. Chartwise, the album debuted on the Billboard 200 at number one. It topped the chart for eight consecutive weeks, becoming one of the longest-running number-one albums of 2000. The Recording Industry Association of America (RIAA) certified No Strings Attached nine-times Platinum on April 19, 2000, becoming the highest-certified single disc album in the initial RIAA audit in that year. It broke the record previously set in 1993 by The Bodyguard soundtrack, which was certified six-times Platinum in the RIAA's first audit. No Strings Attached shipped 10 million copies domestically in 2000 alone, of which 9,936,104 were sold, according to Nielsen Soundscan. This consequently made No Strings Attached the highest-selling album of 2000 in the United States. As of October 2014, No Strings Attached sold 11.16 million copies per SoundScan. An additional 1.52 million copies sold through the BMG Music Club are not included in SoundScan's total. In 2000, No Strings Attached was ranked at number one on the Billboard 200 year end chart. According to Billboard, No Strings Attached was the top album of the decade. Worldwide, the album reached 14 million of copies by July 2001, according to Jive Records.

== Legacy ==
By status, NSYNC was considered a clone of the Backstreet Boys. With the success that the band attained with No Strings Attached, that notion was obliterated, even calling them as a serious rival with their label mate. On November 21, 2000, the Backstreet Boys issued their follow-up album Black & Blue, which sold 1.6 million in its debut week domestically, alongside selling 5 million copies worldwide. According to Richard Skanse of Rolling Stone, the album gave the group its landmark achievement. For Janet Kleinbaum, Jive's then-Vice President of Artist Marketing, the "yardstick is definitely extended", referring to the record by which future releases of Jive would have to be compared with. After No Strings Attached, Jive's other popular artists at the time, such as Britney Spears and the Backstreet Boys, were each releasing an album. Kleinbaum thought, "We know now what the possibilities are. We're not going to compare a Britney Spears record to NSYNC, or Backstreet Boys. However, NSYNC has shown us what can be done."

Referring to the first day sale of the album with 1.1 million units, Josh Wolk of Entertainment Weekly said that it was "perhaps the greatest mass spending of allowances in history". Craig Seymour of the same publication said, "What has the industry buzzing is not only that 2.4 million fans rushed to the stores, but that teen-pop behemoth Jive Records was in a unique and almost unprecedented position to meet the stores' demand". This demand for physical copies of the album was met by Jive by shipping millions of units, leading to the album's release date. The label was able to ship 4.2 million copies for the album's official release date, then couriered another 2.3 million in reorders the next day on March 22, 2000. Retailer Grandoni said, "If they hadn't been ready for it, stores would have sold out after a couple of days, which would have limited their first-week sales".

The teen pop trend reached a climax following the peak of No Strings Attached, where customers moved from CDs to peer-to-peer file sharing such as Napster and LimeWire. Kirkpatrick reflected twenty years later: "We were ahead of the trend when we came out [...] and then the trends caught up, because that's what trends do". NPR wrote that the album has stood the test of time today, stating that "a union of Swedish pop songcraft with R&B and hip-hop's flow and bounce; an eagerness to explore mature themes and styles; an understanding that dance and visual presentation can turn stars into icons". Writing for Consequence of Sound, Anna Rahmanan stated that South Korean boy band BTS have followed in NSYNC's footsteps in crossing music genres, as their initial start as a hip-hop group had led them to branch out into different genres such as K-pop, EDM, and R&B. She complimented their adaptability by "tearing a page out of 'N Sync's playbook", while simultaneously showcasing their originality. No Strings Attached was ranked 111th on the Billboard Top 200 Albums of All Time.

== Track listing ==
No Strings Attached — U.S. edition
| No. | Title | Writer(s) | Producer(s) | Length |
|---|---|---|---|---|
| 1. | "Bye Bye Bye" | Kristian Lundin; Jake Schulze; Andreas Carlsson | Lundin; Schulze | 3:20 |
| 2. | "It's Gonna Be Me" | Max Martin; Rami Yacoub; Carlsson | Yacoub | 3:12 |
| 3. | "Space Cowboy (Yippie-Yi-Yay)" (featuring Lisa "Left Eye" Lopes) | JC Chasez; Alex Greggs; Bradley Daymond; Lisa Lopes; Inga Willis | Chasez; Riprock 'n' Alex G | 4:23 |
| 4. | "Just Got Paid" (Johnny Kemp cover) | Teddy Riley; Gene Griffin; Aaron Hall; Johnny Kemp | Riley | 4:10 |
| 5. | "It Makes Me Ill" | Kevin Briggs; Kandi | She'kspere; Kandi^{[a]} | 3:27 |
| 6. | "This I Promise You" | Richard Marx | Marx | 4:44 |
| 7. | "No Strings Attached" | Chasez; Greggs; Daymond | Chasez; Riprock 'n' Alex G | 3:50 |
| 8. | "Digital Get Down" | Chasez; David Nicoll | Renn; Riprock 'n' Alex G | 4:23 |
| 9. | "Bringin' da Noise" | Chasez; Renn | Renn; Riprock 'n' Alex G; Chasez^{[b]} | 3:32 |
| 10. | "That's When I'll Stop Loving You" | Diane Warren | Guy Roche | 4:51 |
| 11. | "I'll Be Good for You" | Justin Timberlake; Kevin "K-Toonz" Antunes; Theodore Pendergrass; Reginald Calloway; Vincent Calloway | Timberlake; Antunes | 3:56 |
| 12. | "I Thought She Knew" | Robin Wiley | Wiley | 3:22 |
| Total length: | | | | 47:10 |

No Strings Attached — UK edition
| No. | Title | Writer(s) | Producer(s) | Length |
|---|---|---|---|---|
| 1. | "Bye Bye Bye" | Lundin; Schulze; Carlsson | Lundin; Schulze | 3:20 |
| 2. | "It's Gonna Be Me" | Martin; Rami; Carlsson | Rami | 3:12 |
| 3. | "Space Cowboy (Yippie-Yi-Yay)" (featuring Lisa "Left Eye" Lopes) | Chasez; Greggs; Daymond; Lopes; Willis | Chasez; Riprock 'n' Alex G | 4:23 |
| 4. | "Just Got Paid" | Riley; Griffin; Hall; Kemp | Riley | 4:10 |
| 5. | "It Makes Me Ill" | Briggs; Kandi | She'kspere; Kandi^{[a]} | 3:27 |
| 6. | "This I Promise You" | Marx | Marx | 4:44 |
| 7. | "No Strings Attached" | Chasez; Greggs; Daymond | Chasez; Riprock 'n' Alex G | 3:50 |
| 8. | "Digital Get Down" | Chasez; Nicoll | Renn; Riprock 'n' Alex G | 4:23 |
| 9. | "I'll Never Stop" | Lundin; Martin; Alexander Kronlund | Lundin | 3:26 |
| 10. | "Bringin' da Noise" | Chasez; Renn | Renn; Riprock 'n' Alex G; Chasez^{[b]} | 3:32 |
| 11. | "That's When I'll Stop Loving You" | Warren | Roche | 4:51 |
| 12. | "I'll Be Good for You" | Timberlake; Antunes; Pendergrass; R. Calloway; V.Calloway | Timberlake; Antunes | 3:56 |
| 13. | "If I'm Not the One" | Fredrik Thomander; Anders Wikstrom | Gary Carolla; Peter Ries | 3:21 |
| 14. | "I Thought She Knew" | Robin Wiley | Wiley | 3:22 |
| Total length: | | | | 53:57 |

No Strings Attached — Special UK edition bonus tracks (amended to original Europe release)
| No. | Title | Writer(s) | Producer(s) | Length |
|---|---|---|---|---|
| 15. | "Could It Be You" | Skinner; Renn | Renn | 3:41 |
| 16. | "This Is Where the Party's At" | Skinner; Renn | Renn | 3:39 |
| Total length: | | | | 61:17 |

No Strings Attached — Japanese bonus tracks
| No. | Title | Writer(s) | Producer(s) | Length |
|---|---|---|---|---|
| 13. | "I'll Never Stop" | Lundin; Martin; Kronlund | Lundin | 3:26 |
| 14. | "If Only in Heaven's Eyes" | Kenneth "Babyface" Edmonds | Edmonds | 4:37 |
| 15. | "Bye Bye Bye" (Teddy Riley Club Mix) | Lundin; Shulze; Carlsson | Lundin; Shulze | 5:30 |
| Total length: | | | | 60:43 |

No Strings Attached — Australian bonus tracks
| No. | Title | Writer(s) | Producer(s) | Length |
|---|---|---|---|---|
| 13. | "I'll Never Stop" | Lundin; Martin; Kronlund | Lundin | 3:26 |
| 14. | "If Only in Heaven's Eyes" | Edmonds | Edmonds | 4:37 |
| 15. | "Could It Be You" | Skinner; Renn | Renn | 3:41 |
| Total length: | | | | 58:54 |

No Strings Attached — Spanish bonus tracks
| No. | Title | Writer(s) | Producer(s) | Length |
|---|---|---|---|---|
| 13. | "I'll Never Stop" | Lundin; Martin; Kronlund | Lundin | 3:26 |
| 14. | "If I'm Not the One" | Wikstrom; Thomander | Carolla; Ries | 3:21 |
| 15. | "Yo Te Voy a Amar" | Marx | Marx | 4:48 |
| Total length: | | | | 58:45 |

Credits adapted from the album's liner notes. All lead vocals provided by Justin Timberlake and JC Chasez, except for "I Thought She Knew" which also features lead vocals from Joey Fatone and Chris Kirkpatrick.

Notes

- ^{^a} signifies a vocal producer
- ^{^b} signifies a co-producer
- "I'll Be Good for You" contains portions of the song "Believe in Love" (1993), written by Teddy Pendergrass, Reginald Calloway, Vincent Calloway, Steve Beckham and Keith Robinson, and performed by Teddy Pendergrass.

== Personnel ==
Personnel adapted from the album's liner notes.

NSYNC

- Lance Bass – bass background vocals, vocal arrangement
- JC Chasez – tenor lead vocals, vocal arrangement, producer, mixing
- Joey Fatone – baritone background vocals, vocal arrangement
- Chris Kirkpatrick – countertenor background vocals, vocal arrangement
- Justin Timberlake – tenor lead vocals, vocal arrangement, producer, mixing

Featured performer

- Lisa "Left Eye" Lopes – rap, performer

Additional musicians

- Michael Railton – keyboards
- Michael Thompson – guitar
- Esbjörn Öhrwall – guitar

Production

- Richard Marx – arranger, producer, vocal arrangement
- Teddy Riley – producer
- Guy Roche – arranger, keyboards, producer, drum programming
- Diane Warren – executive producer
- Robin Wiley – arranger, producer
- Veit Renn – producer
- Jake Schulze – producer
- Bradley 'Riprock' Daymond – producer, mixing
- Kristian Lundin – producer
- Kandi – vocal arrangement, vocal producer
- Rami – producer
- Alex G. – producer, mixing

Technical

- Jez Colin – drum programming
- David Cole – engineer, mixing
- Mick Guzauski – mixing
- Scott Humphrey – engineer
- Mario Lucy – engineer
- George Mayers – engineer
- Pat McMakin – mixing
- Carl Nappa – engineer, mixing
- Dushyant Bhakta – engineer, mixing
- Chris Trevett – engineer
- Michael Tucker – engineer, mixing
- Franz Verna – engineer
- Tom Bender – mixing assistant
- Charles McCrorey – assistant engineer
- Cesar Ramirez – assistant engineer
- Jason Piske – mixing assistant
- Chaz Harper – mastering
- Dag Gabrielsen – assistant mastering engineer
- Adam Barber – engineer, vocal engineer
- John Amatiello – Pro-Tools engineer
- Joe Smith – engineer, mixing
- Brady Barnett – digital editing
- Ok Hee Kim – assistant engineer
- Joe Woods – assistant engineer
- Shane Stoneback – mixing assistant
- Bray Merritt – assistant engineer
- Toby Dearborn – assistant engineer

== Charts ==
=== Weekly charts ===
Weekly chart performance for No Strings Attached
| Chart (2000) | Peak position |
|---|---|
| Australian Albums (ARIA) | 3 |
| Australian Dance Albums (ARIA) | 2 |
| Austrian Albums (Ö3 Austria) | 16 |
| Belgian Albums (Ultratop Flanders) | 8 |
| Canadian Albums (Billboard) | 1 |
| Danish Albums (Hitlisten) | 12 |
| Dutch Albums (Album Top 100) | 6 |
| European Albums Chart | 12 |
| Finnish Albums (Suomen virallinen lista) | 14 |
| German Albums (Offizielle Top 100) | 7 |
| Hungarian Albums (MAHASZ) | 15 |
| Icelandic Albums (Tónlist) | 26 |
| Irish Albums (IRMA) | 27 |
| Italian Albums (FIMI) | 26 |
| Italian Albums (Musica e Dischi) | 35 |
| Japanese Albums (Oricon) | 19 |
| Malaysian Albums (IFPI) | 1 |
| New Zealand Albums (RMNZ) | 12 |
| Norwegian Albums (VG-lista) | 12 |
| Scottish Albums (Official Charts) | 22 |
| Singaporean Albums (SPVA) | 1 |
| Spanish Albums (Promusicae) | 32 |
| Swedish Albums (Sverigetopplistan) | 22 |
| Swiss Albums (Schweizer Hitparade) | 7 |
| UK Albums (Official Charts) | 14 |
| UK Independent Albums (Official Charts) | 4 |
| US Billboard 200 | 1 |

=== Year-end charts ===
Year-end chart performance for No Strings Attached in 2000
| Chart (2000) | Position |
|---|---|
| Australian Albums (ARIA) | 45 |
| Belgian Albums (Ultratop Flanders) | 83 |
| Canadian Albums (Nielsen SoundScan) | 3 |
| Dutch Albums (MegaCharts) | 97 |
| German Albums (Offizielle Top 100) | 69 |
| Singaporean English Albums (SPVA) | 3 |
| South Korean International Albums (MIAK) | 26 |
| UK Albums (OCC) | 86 |
| US Billboard 200 | 1 |

Year-end chart performance for No Strings Attached in 2001
| Chart (2001) | Position |
|---|---|
| Canadian Albums (Nielsen SoundScan) | 138 |
| US Billboard 200 | 30 |

=== Decade-end charts ===
Decade-end chart performance for No Strings Attached from 2000 to 2009
| Chart (2000–2009) | Position |
|---|---|
| US Billboard 200 | 1 |

== Certifications ==
Certifications and sales for No Strings Attached
| Region | Certification | Certified units/sales |
|---|---|---|
| Argentina (CAPIF) | Platinum | 60,000^{^} |
| Australia (ARIA) | Platinum | 70,000^{^} |
| Brazil (Pro-Música Brasil) | Gold | 100,000^{*} |
| Canada (Music Canada) | Diamond | 1,000,000^{^} |
| Denmark (IFPI Danmark) | Platinum | 20,000^{‡} |
| Germany (BVMI) | Gold | 150,000^{^} |
| Japan (RIAJ) | Gold | 100,000^{^} |
| Malaysia (RIM) | Platinum | 100,000 |
| Mexico (AMPROFON) | Gold | 75,000^{^} |
| Netherlands (NVPI) | Gold | 40,000^{^} |
| New Zealand (RMNZ) | Platinum | 15,000^{^} |
| Singapore (SPVA) | — | 45,000 |
| Spain (Promusicae) | Gold | 50,000^{^} |
| United Kingdom (BPI) | Gold | 206,000 |
| United States (RIAA) | 12× Platinum | 14,500,000 (Note: As of March 2015, the album has sold 12,980,000 copies in the US according to Nielsen SoundScan, which does not count albums sold through clubs like the BMG Music Club, where it sold 1.52 million units as of February 2003. Combined, it has sold over 14,500,000 copies in the United States.) |
^{*} Sales figures based on certification alone.^{^} Shipments figures based on certification alone.^{‡} Sales+streaming figures based on certification alone.

== See also ==
- List of best-selling albums in the United States
- List of fastest-selling albums
- List of Billboard 200 number-one albums of 2000
