= Bye Bye Bye =

2000 single by NSYNC

Single by NSYNC

from the album No Strings Attached
- B-side: "Could It Be You"
- Released: January 17, 2000
- Studio: Battery (New York City); Cheiron (Stockholm, Sweden); Cove City Sound (Orlando, Florida)
- Genre: Dance-pop
- Length: 3:20
- Label: Jive
- Songwriters: Kristian Lundin; Jake Schulze; Andreas Carlsson
- Producers: Kristian Lundin; Jake Schulze

NSYNC singles chronology
"Music of My Heart" (1999)	"Bye Bye Bye" (2000)	"It's Gonna Be Me" (2000)

Audio sample
- file; help

Music video
- "Bye Bye Bye" on YouTube

"Bye Bye Bye" is a song by American boy band NSYNC from their third studio album, No Strings Attached. It was written and produced by Kristian Lundin and Jake Schulze, with Andreas Carlsson providing additional songwriting. Jive Records released it for US contemporary hit radio stations as the album's lead single on January 17, 2000. Its lyrics describe the end of a romantic relationship; it was reported to also reference the group's separation from their manager Lou Pearlman and their record label RCA Records. "Bye Bye Bye" is widely considered to be the group's signature song.

"Bye Bye Bye" was met with generally favorable reviews from music critics. It became a commercial success, peaking at number four on the US Billboard Hot 100 and within the top 10 in almost every country in which it charted. The song received a Grammy nomination at the 43rd Annual Grammy Awards in 2001 for Record of the Year, but lost to U2's "Beautiful Day". The song resurged in popularity in 2024 after it was featured in the film Deadpool & Wolverine. In March 2025, "Bye Bye Bye" became the first song by the band to achieve one billion streams on Spotify.

The accompanying music video, directed by Wayne Isham, was released on January 11, 2000, and portrays the NSYNC members as puppets, in reference to their destiny being controlled by their manager, Lou Pearlman, during their legal dispute. It was the last music video shown on MTV 00s before it ceased broadcasting on December 31, 2025.

== Background and development ==
"Bye Bye Bye" was written and produced by Kristian Lundin and Jake Schulze, as part of Cheiron Productions, with additional writing by Andreas Carlsson. Lundin stated that it was "totally production driven" and "created from the kick and the bass up". Carlsson wrote the song's lyrics while he was taking a driver's test in Stockholm, Sweden. The song was intended to be recorded by English boy band 5ive, but they rejected it as they wanted to become a rap band. Carlsson recalled that one of the band members immediately called for his security and left for the airport. The song's chorus was initially written as a rap, where 5ive feared that they would be competing against Eminem.

Prior to its official release, NSYNC performed "Bye Bye Bye" at the Radio Music Awards on October 28, 1999, at the LIFEbeat AIDS benefit concert in New York on December 1, 1999, and on The Rosie O'Donnell Show on Christmas Eve in 1999. The song was released on January 17, 2000, although it was not available as a commercial single to increase demand for NSYNC's 2000 studio album No Strings Attached. Jive Records feared that "Bye Bye Bye" was released too early vis-à-vis the album, which caused them to consider releasing a second single in order to sustain interest.

== Composition ==
The song opens with a string crescendo that climbs before Justin Timberlake's nasal ad-lib of the phrase, "Hey, hey", which leads to the five-part harmony of the song's title. Instrumentation consisted of "buzzy electronics" adding texture to the band's vocals in contrast to the doo-wop of the Backstreet Boys, as well as hard drums, with a snare and kick drum. Lyrically, "Bye Bye Bye" describes a man's desires to end a romantic relationship with a difficult significant other. Carlsson initially wrote the song after his girlfriend left him for another man, whom she married and had children with. Sheet music for "Bye Bye Bye" shows the key of G♯ minor with a tempo of 86 beats per minute in 4/4 common time. The group members' vocals span from C♯_{2} to G♯_{5}.

== Critical reception ==
"Bye Bye Bye" was met with generally favorable reviews from music critics. Stephen Thomas Erlewine of AllMusic described the song as a "piledriving dance number with the catchiest chorus they've ever sang." Robert Christgau commented that it featured "prefab rhythm at its most efficient." In 2015, Billboard's Jason Lipshutz ranked it third on the list "Top 20 Essential Boy Band Songs," describing the song as "an absolute monster of a lead single." Additionally writing for the same magazine in 2018, Billboard staff placed "Bye Bye Bye" at number 12 on "The 100 Greatest Boy Band Songs of All Time", stating that it was one of "the most decisive breakup anthems in pop history" that contained "an iconic dance move to match". Rolling Stone staff ranked it as the sixth-greatest boy band song of all time, writing, "it remains their defining track, a four-minute blast of big hooks, tight harmonies and intriguingly meta subtext." However, another editor from the same magazine listed it as the 17th most annoying song of all time in 2007. In 2013, Complex's Kathy Iandoli ranked it as the best boy band song ever.

The song won Best Pop Video, Best Choreography in a Video, and Viewer's Choice at the 2000 MTV Video Music Awards, the most awarded to a single video that year. It also won a Radio Music Radio Award in 2000 for Best Song of the Year. The song was nominated for Record of the Year and Best Pop Performance by a Duo or Group with Vocal at the 43rd Annual Grammy Awards. Other awards included 3 Teen Choice Awards in 2000 (Choice Single, Choice Music Video, and Song of the Summer), MuchMusic Video Music Award (Favorite International Group for "Bye Bye Bye") and a Blockbuster Entertainment Award 2001 (category Favorite Single for "Bye Bye Bye").

== Chart performance ==
"Bye Bye Bye" debuted on the Billboard Hot 100 at number 42, the week of January 29, 2000, reaching the top 10 by the week of March 4. The song remained in the top 10 through May 20, 2000, for 12 weeks. The single peaked at number four in April 2000 for two consecutive weeks. On the Mainstream Top 40 chart the song reached number one on March 4, 2000, and stayed at the top of the chart for ten weeks, making it one of the songs with most weeks at number one on that chart. The song topped the charts in Australia and New Zealand, and peaked at number three in the United Kingdom. On the week of March 24, 2014, the song re-entered the New Zealand Singles Chart at number 14.

== Music video ==
=== Background ===
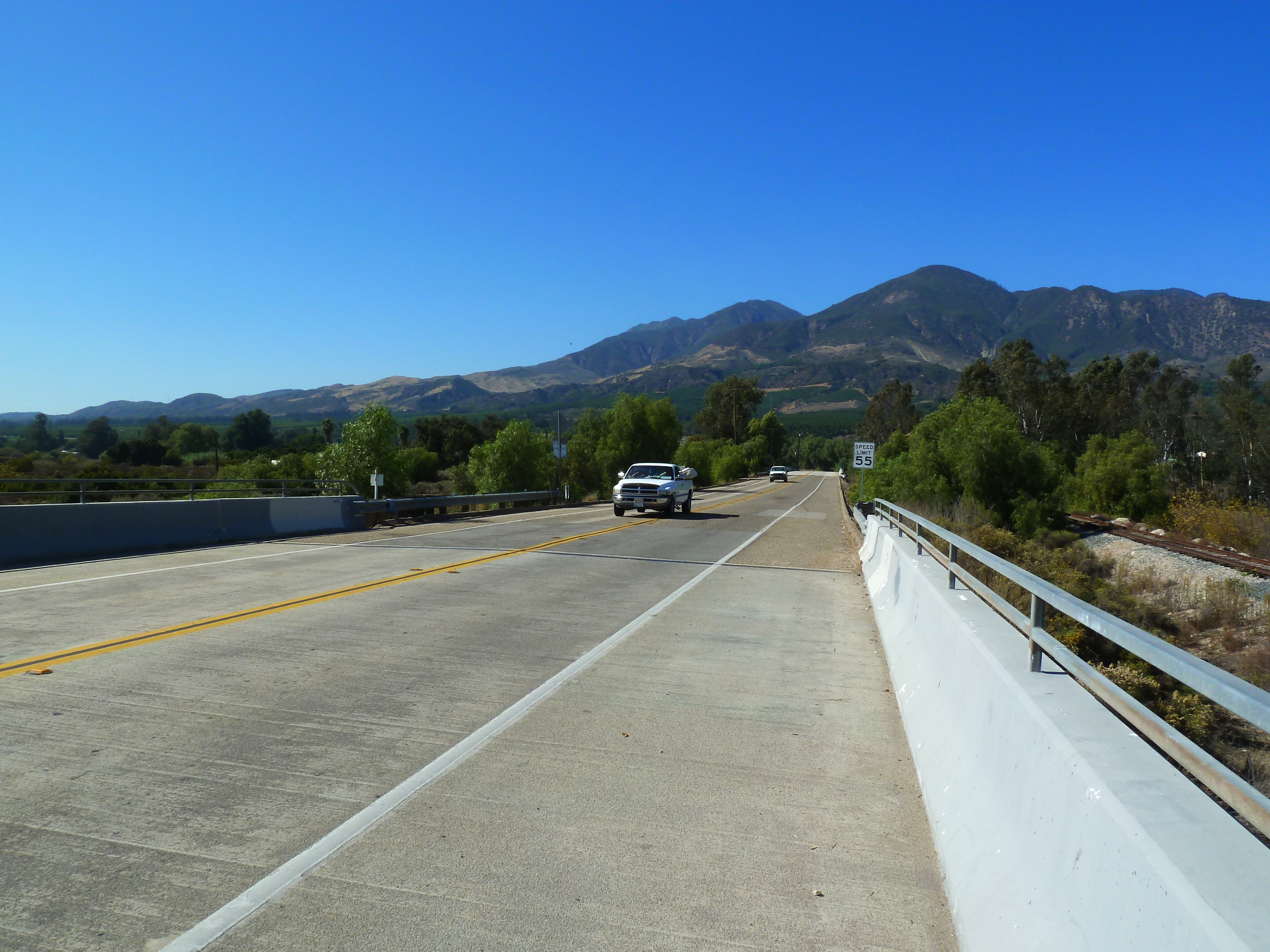
Elements of the music video were filmed in Fillmore, California.

The video was directed by Wayne Isham, and was released on January 11, 2000. The budget was estimated to be $1 million, which was attributed to the band wanting to be noticed on MTV. The song's dance routine was choreographed by Darrin Henson, who received a phone call from NSYNC's manager Johnny Wright, as he was about to quit the music industry after missing out on a MTV Video Music Award for Jordan Knight's "Give It to You". Henson flew to Las Vegas, Nevada in 1999, where the band were performing at the 1999 Billboard Music Awards, so that he would be able to listen to the track. The band rehearsed at the Alley Kat Studio in Los Angeles over a few days, where Henson stated in a 2020 interview with Entertainment Weekly that he implemented moves that cannot be replicated by other groups such as the "black power fist", which he defined as "stop talking s—" when used in the song's title lyric. Henson won an MTV Video Music Award for Best Choreography at the 2000 MTV Video Music Awards, while NSYNC also won Best Pop Video at the same ceremony.

The group contacted Isham through the phone, before he met them during dance rehearsals for the song. The band were fastened to bungee cords during the music video's shoot to mimick puppets on strings. Choreography was performed in a blue gimbal room, which Isham pointed out was inspired both by Fred Astaire in Royal Wedding and Lionel Richie's "Dancing on the Ceiling" music video (both directed and choreographed by Stanley Donen). During the speeding train sequence, Chris Kirkpatrick and Joey Fatone performed their own stunts as they jumped from one train carriage to another, as a Steadicam operator needed to be replaced mid-scene, due to being uncomfortable with the risk. JC Chasez and Lance Bass were placed in a red Dodge Viper RT/10 for the car chase scene. After Chasez told director Isham that his favorite car chase scene was the Robert De Niro car chase scene in Ronin (1998), the stunt driver crew and coordinators from Ronin were hired to coordinate the car chase scenes for the music video. The scene where Bass and Chasez drop into the car was filmed with an 18-wheeler carrying a pole, which allowed the two to drop into the car. Both scenes were shot in Fillmore, California as the train scenes were filmed on the Fillmore and Western Railway, a heritage railway that ceased operations in 2021. Additional filming of the car-chase scenes was done on Piru Canyon Road, the route to Lake Piru - which is visible in the background during the car chase.

On the January 24, 2000, episode of Making the Video, Timberlake explained his reaction to shooting his scene in the music video, stating that he had the easiest time with the stunts in comparison with the other band members, but wanted to "look good" while running instead of appearing like a "dork".

=== Synopsis ===
The NSYNC members portray puppets, in reference to their destiny being controlled by their manager Lou Pearlman, during their legal dispute.

The video starts with the puppet master, Kim Smith, manipulating the NSYNC members as they are tied to strings. She cuts Kirkpatrick and Fatone loose first, as they run atop a speeding train and hide among the passengers to elude her. She cuts Timberlake loose next, as he outruns her trained dogs inside a warehouse and escapes into the pouring rain. Chasez and Bass are finally cut loose, as they fall into a red Dodge Viper RT/10. When the music pauses, Chasez cleans the disc and reinserts it before continuing. They flee from her, as she pursues them in a silver BMW Z3. They eventually make a sudden U-turn when a truck blocks them, forcing the puppet master to brake more slowly and spend more time performing a U-turn, allowing the two to flee in the opposite direction.

All the scenes are interspersed with shots of the band dancing in a rotating blue gimbal with a fixed camera, creating the illusion that they are on different gravity planes. The video edit of the song also briefly pauses the music when Timberlake lands in the warehouse, when Chasez and Bass land in the car to insert a CD, and the U-turn near the video's end. The final chorus is also extended twice; the first showcases the band inside the box, while the second highlights Chasez and Bass fleeing from the puppet master.

=== Reception ===
The music video peaked at number one on the Total Request Live countdown for 25 consecutive days. The video was ranked at number 60 on MuchMusic's 100 Best Videos. In 2018, iHeartRadio's Nicole Mastrogiannis ranked Timberlake's appearance in the video as first on the Iconic Music Moments From the 00s list. The same year Billboard critics ranked it 21st among the "greatest music videos of the 21st century."

== In other media ==
"Bye Bye Bye" is featured in the films X2 (2003), Red Rocket (2021), and Deadpool & Wolverine (2024). In Red Rocket, the song was also covered by Suzanna Son with piano accompaniment and later released as a single. Deadpool & Wolverine contains a partial recreation of the dance performed in the music video, as Deadpool (Ryan Reynolds) uses the deceased Wolverine's (Hugh Jackman) skeleton as a weapon to kill Time Variance Authority agents. An emote based on the dance performed in the music video was added to the video game Fortnite in 2024.

== Awards and nominations ==
Awards and nominations received for "Bye Bye Bye"
Award	Result
2000 MTV Video Music Awards
Video of the Year	Nominated
Best Group Video	Nominated
Best Pop Video	Won
Best Dance Video	Nominated
Best Choreography	Won
Viewers Choice	Won
2000 MuchMusic Video Awards
People's Choice: Favorite International Group	Won
2001 Grammy Awards
Record of the Year	Nominated
Best Pop Performance by a Duo or Group with Vocal	Nominated
2001 Kids' Choice Awards
Favorite Song	Nominated
2000 Teen Choice Awards
Choice Single	Won

== Track listing ==
- CD single
1. "Bye Bye Bye" – 3:19
2. "Bye Bye Bye" (Instrumental) – 3:19
3. "Could It Be You" – 3:41

Remixes

1. "Bye Bye Bye" (Teddy Riley's Funk Remix) – 4:50
2. "Bye Bye Bye" (Teddy Riley's Club Remix) – 5:28
3. "Bye Bye Bye" (Riprock 'n' Alex G. Club Remix) – 6:32
4. "Bye Bye Bye" (Riprock 'n' Alex G. Club Remix Radio Edit) – 4:53
5. "Bye Bye Bye" (Sal Dano's Peak Hour Dub) – 8:30

== Credits and personnel ==
Credits are adapted from the back cover of "Bye Bye Bye".

Recording

- Recorded at Battery Studios, NYC; Cove City Sound Studios, Orlando, FL; and Cheiron Studios, Stockholm, Sweden.

Personnel

- Kristian Lundin – songwriter, producer
- Jake Schulze – songwriter, producer
- Andreas Carlsson – songwriter
- Michael Tucker – recording engineer/Roland TR-909
- Bray Merritt – assistant engineer
- Casey LaPoint – harp
- Esbjörn Öhrwall – guitar
- Tom Coyne – mastering

== Charts ==
=== Weekly charts ===
2000 weekly chart performance for "Bye Bye Bye"
Chart (2000)	Peak position
Australia (ARIA)	1
Austria (Ö3 Austria Top 40)	12
Belgium (Ultratop 50 Flanders)	7
Belgium (Ultratop 50 Wallonia)	21
Canada (Nielsen SoundScan)	1
Canada (Nielsen SoundScan) Import	7
Canada Top Singles (RPM)	1
Canada Adult Contemporary (RPM)	16
Canada Dance/Urban (RPM)	25
Chile (El Siglo de Torreón)	4
Croatia International (HRT) (Note: Only a partial archive of the Croatian chart is available so it is possible that the single had a higher peak.)	9
Denmark (IFPI)	7
Estonia (Eesti Top 20)	9
Europe (Eurochart Hot 100)	5
Europe (European Hit Radio)	4
Finland (Suomen virallinen lista)	7
France (SNEP)	46
Germany (GfK)	4
Greece (IFPI)	2
Guatemala (El Siglo de Torreón)	6
Hungary (Mahasz)	4
Iceland (Íslenski Listinn Topp 40)	29
Ireland (IRMA)	16
Italy (FIMI)	7
Italy (Musica e dischi)	7
Latvia (Latvijas Top 30)	10
Netherlands (Dutch Top 40)	3
Netherlands (Single Top 100)	4
New Zealand (Recorded Music NZ)	1
Norway (VG-lista)	3
Romania (Romanian Top 100)	9
Scottish Singles Sales (Official Charts)	5
Spain (Promusicae)	7
Spain Airplay (Top 40 Radio)	1
Sweden (Sverigetopplistan)	3
Switzerland (Schweizer Hitparade)	7
UK Singles (Official Charts)	3
UK Airplay (Music Week)	14
UK Independent (Official Charts)	2
US Billboard Hot 100	4
US Adult Contemporary (Billboard)	25
US Adult Pop Airplay (Billboard)	19
US Pop Airplay (Billboard)	1
US Rhythmic Airplay (Billboard)	2

2014 weekly chart performance for "Bye Bye Bye"
Chart (2014)	Peak position
New Zealand (Recorded Music NZ)	14

2024–2026 weekly chart performance for "Bye Bye Bye"
Chart (2024–2026)	Peak position
Argentina Hot 100 (Billboard)	54
Australia (ARIA)	20
Bolivia (Billboard)	14
Brazil Hot 100 (Billboard)	60
Canada Hot 100 (Billboard)	26
Czech Republic Singles Digital (ČNS IFPI)	7
Ecuador (Billboard)	25
Finland Airplay (Radiosoittolista)	83
France (SNEP)	110
Global 200 (Billboard)	12
Greece International (IFPI)	12
Hong Kong (Billboard)	9
Hungary (Single Top 40)	22
Iceland (Tónlistinn)	27
India International (IMI)	2
Israel (Mako Hitlist)	40
Italy (FIMI)	84
Japan Hot Overseas (Billboard Japan)	14
Kazakhstan Airplay (TopHit)	78
Lithuania (AGATA)	57
Malaysia (Billboard)	2
Malaysia International (RIM)	2
Middle East and North Africa (IFPI)	17
Norway (VG-lista)	34
Peru (Billboard)	14
Philippines Hot 100 (Billboard Philippines)	41
Poland (Polish Streaming Top 100)	29
Portugal (AFP)	31
Singapore (RIAS)	6
Slovakia Singles Digital (ČNS IFPI)	19
Spain (Promusicae)	82
Taiwan (Billboard)	8
United Arab Emirates (IFPI)	6
UK Singles (Official Charts)	12
US Billboard Hot 100	45

=== Monthly charts ===
Monthly chart performance for "Bye Bye Bye"
Chart (2024)	Position
Czech Republic (Singles Digitál – Top 100)	15
Panama Streaming (PRODUCE)	56

=== Year-end charts ===
2000 year-end chart performance for "Bye Bye Bye"
Chart (2000)	Position
Australia (ARIA)	7
Belgium (Ultratop 50 Flanders)	50
Brazil (Crowley)	22
Europe (Eurochart Hot 100)	48
Europe (European Hit Radio)	62
Germany (Media Control)	50
Italy (Musica e dischi)	40
Netherlands (Dutch Top 40)	48
Netherlands (Single Top 100)	60
New Zealand (RIANZ)	26
Romania (Romanian Top 100)	62
Sweden (Hitlistan)	12
Switzerland (Schweizer Hitparade)	44
Taiwan (Hito Radio)	34
UK Singles (OCC)	79
US Billboard Hot 100	21
US Mainstream Top 40 (Billboard)	3
US Rhythmic Top 40 (Billboard)	11

2024 year-end chart performance for "Bye Bye Bye"
Chart (2024)	Position
Global 200 (Billboard)	191

=== Decade-end charts ===
Decade-end chart performance for "Bye Bye Bye"
Chart (2000–2009)	Position
Australia (ARIA)	95

== Certifications ==
Certifications and sales for "Bye Bye Bye"
Region	Certification	Certified units/sales
Australia (ARIA)	7× Platinum	490,000^{‡}
Canada (Music Canada)	3× Platinum	240,000^{‡}
Germany (BVMI)	Gold	250,000^{^}
Italy (FIMI) sales since 2009	Gold	50,000^{‡}
Netherlands (NVPI)	Gold	40,000^{^}
New Zealand (RMNZ)	3× Platinum	90,000^{‡}
Portugal (AFP)	Gold	5,000^{‡}
Spain (Promusicae)	Gold	30,000^{‡}
Sweden (GLF)	Platinum	30,000^{^}
United Kingdom (BPI)	2× Platinum	1,200,000^{‡}
United States (RIAA)	5× Platinum	5,000,000^{‡}
Streaming
Greece (IFPI Greece)	Gold	1,000,000^{†}
^{^} Shipments figures based on certification alone.^{‡} Sales+streaming figures based on certification alone.^{†} Streaming-only figures based on certification alone.

== Release history ==
Release dates and formats for "Bye Bye Bye"
Region	Date	Format(s)	Label	Ref(s).
United States	January 17–18, 2000	Contemporary hit radio	Jive	
United States	February 7, 2000	Hot adult contemporary radio	Jive	
Japan	February 16, 2000	CD	Avex Trax; Jive	
United Kingdom	February 28, 2000	CD; cassette	Jive	
