= JC Chasez discography =

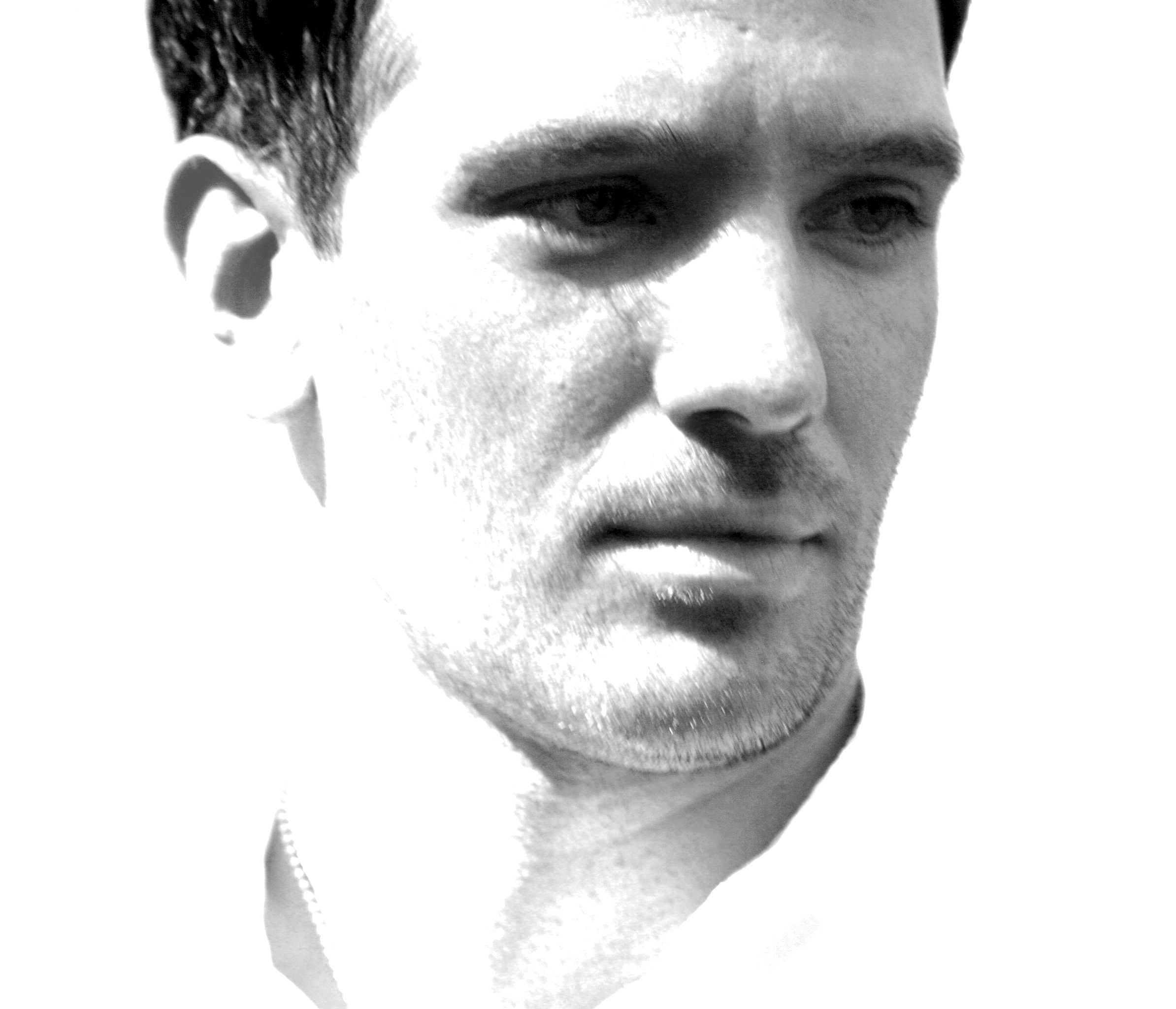
- Chasez at Bryant Park in September 2007
- Studio albums: 2
- Singles: 6
- Music videos: 3
- Guest appearances: 8

The American singer JC Chasez has released two studio albums, one unreleased album, five singles, as well as various guest appearances and music videos. As a member of NSYNC, Chasez co-wrote and produced songs for the band, with four songs including the title track on the group's album No Strings Attached, as well as four songs their album Celebrity.

His first solo single was the song "Blowin' Me Up (With Her Love)" for the Drumline movie soundtrack. His first solo album, Schizophrenic, was released by Jive Records in 2004 after multiple delays. The album sold about 60,000 copies in its first week.

Chasez continues to work as a songwriter and producer for other artists, including the Backstreet Boys, David Archuleta, and NU'EST. He has also appeared occasionally as a guest on songs by various artists such as Richard Marx, Gary Barlow, and Smokey Robinson. His second studio album, Playing with Fire, was released on October 25, 2024. The work is a concept album for a musical produced in collaboration with Jimmy Harry.

== Studio albums ==
Title	Album details	Peak positions			Sales
Title	Album details	US	CAN	UK	Sales
Schizophrenic	Released: February 24, 2004; Label: Jive; Formats: CD, digital download	17	59	46	US: 121,000
Playing with Fire	Released: October 25, 2024; Label: Center Stage Records; Formats: CD, digital download, streaming	—	—	—	

== Singles ==
=== As lead artist ===
Title	Year	Peak chart positions							Album
Title	Year	US	AUS	BEL (FL)	CAN	IRE	NZ	UK	Album
"Blowin' Me Up (With Her Love)"	2002	35	—	—	24	20	—	13	Drumline (the Soundtrack)
"Some Girls (Dance with Women)" (featuring Ol Dirty Bastard)	2003	88	—	—	—	20	—	13	Schizophrenic
"All Day Long I Dream About Sex"	2004	—	25	44	—	—	32	—	Schizophrenic
"—" denotes a recording that did not chart or was not released in that territory.

=== As featured artist ===
Title	Year	Peak chart positions					Album
Title	Year	US	AUS	CAN	IRE	UK	Album
"Somnambulist (Simply Being Loved)" (BT featuring JC Chasez)	2003	98	—	—	—	—	Emotional Technology
"Plug It In" (Basement Jaxx featuring JC Chasez)	2004	—	43	—	45	22	Kish Kash
"Animal" (Kristina Maria featuring JC Chasez)	2012	—	—	97	—	—	Tell the World
"—" denotes a recording that did not chart or was not released in that territory.

== Guest appearances ==
List of non-single guest appearances, with other performing artists, showing year released and album name
Title	Year	Artist	Album
"Bring It All to Me" (Note: Featured vocals are credited to *NSYNC, though only Chasez sings.)	1999	Blaque	Blaque
"Give in to Me"	2000	Euge Groove	Euge Groove
"Force of Gravity"	2003	BT	Emotional Technology
"This I Promise You"	2012	Richard Marx	A Night Out With Friends
"My Girl"	2014	Smokey Robinson, Aloe Blacc, Miguel	Smokey & Friends
"Blow Up the Moon"	2015	Blues Traveler, 3OH!3	Blow Up the Moon
"When These Drugs Wear Off"	2015	Beau Dozier	Antennas
"Back for Good"	2021	Gary Barlow	The Crooner Sessions
"—" denotes a recording that did not chart or was not released in that territory.
