= Schizophrenic (JC Chasez album) =

Studio album by JC Chasez
- Released: February 24, 2004
- Recorded: 2002–2003
- Genres: Pop rock; R&B
- Length: 76:01
- Labels: Jive; Zomba
- Producers: Basement Jaxx; Dallas Austin; Robb Boldt; JC Chasez; Riprock 'n' Alex G

JC Chasez chronology
Schizophrenic (2004)	Playing with Fire (2024)

Singles from Schizophrenic
- 1. "Some Girls (Dance with Women)" Released: November 11, 2003; 2. "All Day Long I Dream About Sex" Released: October 8, 2004

Schizophrenic is the debut studio album by American singer JC Chasez. It was released on February 24, 2004, by Jive Records. The album spanned various musical genres, including New wave, electronica, rock, disco, soul and reggae. Chasez served as a primary producer, co-writing fifteen of the album's tracks. Two singles were released from the album: "Some Girls (Dance with Women)" and "All Day Long I Dream About Sex".

The album had minimal promotion at its time of release. Over the years, Schizophrenic has received retrospective praise from critics for its musical breadth, vocals, production, and electropop sound.

== Background ==
Following the conclusion of their Celebrity Tour in April 2002, boy band NSYNC went on a hiatus, during which Chasez teamed up with producer Dallas Austin to record the song "Blowin' Me Up (With Her Love)" for the soundtrack to the film Drumline. Following the song's success as a single, Chasez began working on a record that he intended to be different from NSYNC's music. Chasez had not intended on embarking on a solo career until Austin convinced him to make an album. Of Austin's encouragement, Chasez said, "He's like, 'You've got too much to say. You know, there's no reason why you shouldn't. You're writing songs anyway.'"

Chasez said the album title is derived "from [its] different styles and attitudes that are on this album. It's gritty, it's noisy, and it is definitely not like anything I've done before." Austin described the music he recorded with Chasez as a throwback "to George Michael and Prince and that '80s era, where even though you had up-tempos, they still had songs to them, they had a lot of attitude.'" Aside from Chasez and Austin, the album features productions from Robb Boldt and Riprock 'n' Alex G, the latter having worked with Chasez on No Strings Attached and Celebrity. Basement Jaxx wrote and produced the song "Shake It" after Chasez lent his vocals to the duo's single "Plug It In."

== Release and promotion ==
The release of Schizophrenic was delayed repeatedly, with a planned release date in the summer of 2003 bumped to that fall, and again bumped to January in the following year. When the album was released on February 24, 2004, promotion was further affected by the Super Bowl XXXVIII halftime show controversy which had occurred earlier that month. Chasez was scheduled to perform "Some Girls (Dance with Women)" at the Pro Bowl in Hawaii a week after the Super Bowl, but due to the NFL's crackdown on what they perceived to be indecent content in the song, organizers demanded Chasez sing "Blowin' Me Up (With Her Love)" instead. Chasez was again asked to make changes to the song, particularly the line: "She was leaning on me/ Getting horny/ Maybe we'll get naughty". Ultimately, Chasez's Pro Bowl appearance was canceled. In addition, radio stations declined to play the single "All Day Long I Dream About Sex" for fear of FCC fines, preventing the song and music video from gaining exposure.

To promote Schizophrenic, Chasez began a mini club tour in December 2003, earning positive reviews from The New York Times and San Francisco Chronicle. Marketing for the album fared better in the United Kingdom, where Chasez was an opening act on several dates for Britney Spears' Onyx Hotel tour. Prior to and after his opening dates for Spears, Chasez toured venues in the U.S accompanied by a five-piece band. In a review of his show at New York's Roseland Ballroom, Chasez was described as "a fine singer who performed every song during the brief but explosive 75-minute set. Still, as good as his voice was (especially on the ballad 'Dear Goodbye'), his dancing stole the show."

Devon Powers of PopMatters noted that "Chasez's years of performing multiple nights to crowds ten times as large were put to good use. Complete with dancers, costume changes, lights, and props, Chasez crossed the line from sheer musician to pure entertainer...If the music business is a circus, Chasez set out to produce The Greatest Show on Earth." Powers also praised his vocal talents: "His voice is, without question, a miracle: elastic and tough, it can move from curdling to coddling in an instant, pushing the limits of what one would think is humanely possible."

Jon Pareles (The New York Times) commented "Mr. Chasez is most retro in his rock; like a promising apprentice, he directly mimicked Robert Plant and Prince (singing Prince's 'Let's Go Crazy'), and whipped up a fervor to rival early Sting in his Police imitation, 'Everything You Want.'" Patrick Berkery (The Philadelphia Inquirer) wrote, "Chasez was a bumping and grinding, locking and popping dancing machine as he sang carnally minded jams from his debut solo outing...in a voice that alternated between achy tenor and fluttery falsetto."

In addition to touring, Chasez appeared and performed on The Tonight Show with Jay Leno, On Air with Ryan Seacrest, and The Ellen DeGeneres Show.

The title and cover art for Schizophrenic attracted criticism from mental health groups for misappropriating schizophrenia, the brain disorder. Chasez issued an apology, clarifying that his album title and cover art was not in reference to the clinical definition of the term, but to the album's varied musical styles.

== Critical reception ==
Professional ratings
Aggregate scores
Source	Rating
Metacritic	57/100
Review scores
Source	Rating
AllMusic	3/5 stars
Blender	3/5 stars
Entertainment Weekly	B−
The Independent	4/5 stars
MTV Asia	7/10
Rolling Stone	3.5/5 stars
Slant Magazine	3/5 stars
Stylus Magazine	D+

Upon release, Schizophrenic garnered mixed to positive reviews from music critics. At Metacritic, which assigns a normalized rating out of 100 to reviews from mainstream critics, the album received an average score of 57 based on 16 reviews. Critics lauded the album for its adventurous range of musical styles. James Hunter of Rolling Stone admired JC for going through different genres throughout the album, concluding with "No doubt about it, Schizophrenic is a lot. It's also cool." P.E. Nelson called the album "an immensely listenable collection of well-crafted pop tunes" that shows Chasez wears "his influences on his sleeve," and Aidin Vaziri of SFGate wrote Schizophrenic proved "that dance music is fun and technological and dirty." Peter Robinson of The Guardian wrote although the album wasn't a commercial success, "Chasez has still come up trumps, creatively and artistically at least, with a dark and unusually adventurous collection of 1980s electro and Prince-type funk".

In another positive review of the album, Joan Anderman of The Boston Globe likened the first single "Some Girls (Dance with Women)" to "a jungly clutch of rhythms iced with an itchy-sweet melody, part conga line, part pop tune. It's sexy and silly and funky in a George Michael sort of way." Critic William Jefferson praised the "fast and furious wordplay" of "Some Girls" as well as its "tightly woven harmonies as alluring as silk and satin." Doug Rule of Metro Weekly wrote, "Chasez exudes confidence in creating pop music -- and especially playful pop music of a hot-blooded, dance orientation," and said the single "All Day Long I Dream About Sex" has a "fascinating acoustic meets electronica sound and an extended instrumental bridge that glistens with updated '80s synth-pop."

Critics also had praise for the album's ballads, particularly "Dear Goodbye" and "Build My World", Chasez's vocals, and the album's production. Stephen Thomas Erlewine of AllMusic praised the producers for taking risks with different genres, concluding "Chasez may not be able to eclipse Timberlake's star, but in his favor, he does have an album that on a strictly musical level tries harder and achieves more than Justified ". Tom Moon of The Philadelphia Inquirer noted how Chasez "avoided the just-add-water hooks of teen pop in favor of more elaborate chord sequences and compositional schemes."

Other critics were divided about the album's refusal to stick to one uniform sound, as well as the album's length. Neil Drumming of Entertainment Weekly noticed the '80s influenced production by Riprock and Alex G. but found Chasez's attempt at a new sound to be "a tad misguided." Much attention was given to the album's more overtly sexual lyrics, which some critics saw as distracting and as an excessive attempt by Chasez to shed his boy band image. Others saw these lyrics as tongue-in-cheek humor, noting how Chasez knowingly "[pokes] fun at himself in the comical 'One Night Stand.'"

In 2016, Troy L. Smith from The Plain Dealer called Schizophrenic "highly underrated". A lack of support from Jive Records, as well as the timing of distribution, have been seen as factors in preventing Schizophrenic from gaining wider appreciation when first released. Within a 2019 piece for Shondaland discussing Chasez's work on Schizophrenic, writer Britt Julious wrote:

"Schizophrenic" showed the sort of promise rarely seen from post-pop stardom musicians. From the smart wordplay of "Some Girls (Dance With Women)" to the progressive, percussion-heavy production of "Blowing Me Up (With Her Love)," "Schizophrenic" was an original album from an artist's artist. Chasez's appreciation for a variety of different genres of music was on full display in the album's production. In the first three tracks alone, Chasez bounces between sensual R&B, comforting pop-rock, and progressive rock. It didn't sound like any other pop released in its era.

In a 2026 review for The Sydney Morning Herald, Tom W. Clarke praised the album's "messy, rich concoction" of "pop, new wave, electronica, rock, disco, soul and reggae". He described it as an "underappreciated work of art".

== Commercial performance ==
Schizophrenic debuted at number 17 on the US Billboard 200 selling 52,000 copies in its first week. In its second week the album dropped 65 positions to number 82 with sales of 15,000. As of 2013, the album has sold 121,000 copies in total.

== Track listing ==
No.	Title	Writer(s)	Producer(s)	Length
1.	"Some Girls (Dance with Women)"	JC Chasez; Brad Daymond; Alex Greggs	Chasez; Riprock 'n' Alex G	4:32
2.	"She Got Me"	Chasez; Gregg Arreguin; Robb Boldt	Chasez; Boldt	3:27
3.	"100 Ways"	Chasez; Boldt; Eric Schermerhorn	Chasez; Boldt	4:14
4.	"Mercy"	Chasez; Daymond; Greggs	Chasez; Riprock 'n' Alex G	4:24
5.	"Build My World"	Chasez; Boldt; London Jones; Tony Lucca; Stephan Moccio	Chasez; Boldt	4:15
6.	"Something Special"	Chasez; Arreguin; Boldt	Chasez; Boldt	3:52
7.	"If You Were My Girl"	Chasez; Daymond; Greggs	Chasez; Riprock 'n' Alex G	5:24
8.	"Shake It"	Felix Buxton; Billy Nicholas; Simon Ratcliffe	Basement Jaxx	4:33
9.	"All Day Long I Dream About Sex"	Chasez; Daymond; Greggs	Chasez; Riprock 'n' Alex G	6:04
10.	"One Night Stand"	Chasez; Daymond; Greggs; Pete Bellotte; Giorgio Moroder; Donna Summer	Chasez; Riprock 'n' Alex G	3:23
11.	"Come to Me"	Boldt; Chasez; Corey Hart; Dana Stinson	Chasez; Boldt	5:58
12.	"Dear Goodbye"	Chasez; Arreguin; Boldt; David J. Carpenter	Chasez; Boldt	5:01
13.	"Everything You Want"	Chasez; Daymond; Greggs	Chasez; Riprock 'n' Alex G	4:29
14.	"Lose Myself"	Chasez; Boldt; Moccio	Chasez; Boldt	4:58
15.	"Right Here (By Your Side)"	Chasez; Greggs	Chasez; Riprock 'n' Alex G	2:43
16.	"Blowin' Me Up (With Her Love)" (bonus track)	Chasez; Dallas Austin	Chasez; Austin	4:50
17.	"Some Girls (Dance with Women)" (featuring Dirt McGirt; bonus track)	Chasez; Daymond; Greggs	Chasez; Riprock 'n' Alex G	3:54

Notes:

- "One Night Stand" contains a sample of Donna Summer's 1977 hit "I Feel Love".
- "Come to Me" contains a sample of Corey Hart's 1983 hit "Sunglasses at Night".

== Charts ==
Chart (2004)	Peak position
Canadian Albums (Nielsen SoundScan)	59
UK Albums (Official Charts)	46
US Billboard 200	17
