= All Day Long I Dream About Sex =

Single by JC Chasez

from the album Schizophrenic
- Released: August 23, 2004
- Genre: Dance-pop; synth-pop
- Length: 4:07
- Label: Jive
- Songwriters: JC Chasez; Bradley Daymond; Alex Greggs
- Producer: Riprock 'n' Alex G

JC Chasez singles chronology
| "Some Girls (Dance with Women)" (2003) | "All Day Long I Dream About Sex" (2004) | "Plug It In" (2004) |

"All Day Long I Dream About Sex" is a song by American singer JC Chasez, who rose to stardom as a member of the 1990s boy band NSYNC. It was released as the second and final single from his debut studio album, Schizophrenic. The uptempo track was a homage to '80s synth-rock pop music. The single was released in Europe and Australia in August 2004, and in the United States in October 2004.

== Background ==
The song was composed after Chasez wanted to recreate a Duran Duran and the Killers type of sound. "'All Day Long I Dream About Sex’ is supposed to be loud, fun & obnoxious. I haven’t heard a great party song like a ‘(You Gotta) Fight for Your Right (To Party!)’ or a ‘We’re Not Gonna Take It’ in so long. Something loud & in your face & good for a laugh!'" Chasez said.

== Music video ==
The music video for "All Day Long I Dream About Sex" was directed by Todd Kellstein and produced by Joseph Kahn. The video features footage of JC performing the song alongside a band and dancers spliced with parodies of adult films. A more risqué version was shot for European audiences.

== Release and promotion ==
Radio was reluctant to play the single due to fear of FCC fines relating to the Super Bowl XXXVIII halftime show controversy. In addition, the music video was not aired on MTV. Chasez said: "'MTV doesn’t want to put it in rotation unless it has radio spins, and radio stations aren’t gonna push a song as hard unless you have MTV playing the video. We all know how that works.'”

In response to the pushback against "All Day Long", Chasez shifted promotion to the ballad "Build My World". The promotional period for Schizophrenic concluded before "Build My World" could officially be promoted as a third single from the album.

== Reception ==
Despite no promotion in the U.S., the single was well received in the UK and Australia, where it was praised for its "80's electro-dance infused sound". In Australia, where the song was released as the first single off Schizophrenic, "All Day Long" received heavy rotation on radio and TV. The music video, which Australian media said captures the "tongue in cheek humour of the track", received airplay on So Fresh, Video Hits, MTV's Most Wanted, and was Channel V's "Ripe Clip of the Week" in its first week. In American reviews, Len Righi of The Morning Call wrote that "All Day Long" "whips New Order and Human League into an electro-pop parfait". Doug Rule of Metro Weekly wrote that the song has a "fascinating acoustic meets electronica sound and an extended instrumental bridge that glistens with updated '80s synth-pop."

== Other versions ==
Apollo Zero reconstructed a mashup featuring the instrumentals and background vocals of the Chasez single with Rick James' vocals from "Super Freak", calling it "All Day Long I Dream About Sex...With a Superfreak". Other underground remixes include the Oddesy 9 Remix, the Sleeper Cell Remix, and the Stengaard Radio Mix.

== Track listing ==
USA Promotional Single

1. "All Day Long I Dream About Sex" [Radio Edit with Fade] – 3:35
2. "All Day Long I Dream About Sex" [Radio Edit Without Fade] – 4:04

UK CD1

1. "All Day Long I Dream About Sex" [Radio Edit with Fade] – 3:35
2. "Right There" - 4:50

UK CD2

1. "All Day Long I Dream About Sex" [Radio Edit Without Fade] – 4:04
2. "All Day Long I Dream About Sex" [Tom Neville Radio Mix] – 4:00
3. "All Day Long I Dream About Sex" [Camel Riders Filthy Mix] – 7:23
4. "All Day Long I Dream About Sex" [Stengaard Remix] – 3:33
5. "All Day Long I Dream About Sex" [CD-Rom Video] – 3:35

USA Promotional 12" Vinyl

1. "All Day Long I Dream About Sex" [LP Version] – 6:05
2. "All Day Long I Dream About Sex" [Radio Edit] – 3:28
3. "All Day Long I Dream About Sex" [Instrumental] – 6:05
4. "Come To Me" [LP Version] – 5:58
5. "Come To Me" [Radio Edit] – 3:29
6. "Come To Me" [Instrumental] – 5:58

== Charts ==
| Chart (2004) | Peak |
|---|---|
| Australia (ARIA) | 25 |
| Australian Dance (ARIA) | 3 |
| Belgium (Ultratop 50 Flanders) | 44 |
| New Zealand (Recorded Music NZ) | 32 |
