= Making the Tour =

Video by NSYNC
- Released: February 6, 2001
- Genre: Documentary
- Length: 72 minutes
- Label: Jive

NSYNC video chronology
Live from Madison Square Garden (2000)	Making the Tour (2001)	PopOdyssey Live (2002)

Making the Tour is the third VHS/DVD by NSYNC, issued on November 21, 2000, by Jive Records. The recording documents the rehearsals and backstage from their No Strings Attached Tour, the concert series promoting their March 2000 studio album.

The release features concert footage interspersed with backstage segments and interviews. Production elements visible in the film include pyrotechnic effects, hydraulic stage lifts, and aerial rigging, consistent with the tour's technical specifications.

The video was certified platinum by the RIAA on March 9, 2001.

== Background ==
The video album documents the rehearsals and behind-the-scenes of *NSYNC's No Strings Attached Tour. The group initially mentioned the tour during an AOL group chat in late 1999, with JC Chasez revealing their plans. It was officially announced on March 21, 2000—the same day as the album's release—with rehearsals starting shortly after. Sponsored by MCY Music and Nabisco and produced by SFX Touring, the tour became an instant success, selling out all 50 initial dates and moving one million tickets on the first day.

The tour later spawned an IMAX concert film and an exclusive MSN partnership for fan content. It received positive to mixed reviews from music critics and fans who praised the band's energy, vocal talents, and onstage persona. It spanned 85 shows across North America between May and October 2000, with reported gross earnings exceeding $70 million.

Rehearsals began in April 2000 at the Lakeland Center in Lakeland, Florida. Due to the closeness of their previous tour, the stage for this outing was very similar. However, the stage included new elements including pyrotechnics, stage lifts and aerial suspension. These elements were the reason why the band opted to perform in stadiums and arenas instead of outdoor amphitheatres. Lance Bass praised the show's spectacle, promising close audience interaction while keeping surprises under wraps.

The tour was first documented on the MTV series, Making the Tour. It followed the band's process from song selection, wardrobe and rehearsals. A full length performance of "Space Cowboy (Yippie-Yi-Yay)" at the Tacoma Dome was shown during the show. The episode aired on July 16, 2000. The video album contained more planning and backstage footage, performances of "Bye Bye Bye" and "This I Promise You", along with the music videos from their current album.

== Critical reception ==
Professional ratings
Review scores
Source	Rating
AllMusic	2/5 stars
KidzWorld	3/5 stars

The KidzWorld review praised some scenes, like the stressful moments (such as Justin worrying over the choreography) and the tour bus interactions, but felt some parts seemed staged for the cameras. Still, they considered the DVD a must-have for hardcore fans, showcasing the hard work behind the expensive shows. According to the critic, it has a positive vibe but nothing over-the-top—not "groundbreaking", just solid content for fans.

== Track listing ==
No.	Title	Length
1.	"No Strings Attached Behind The Scenes"
2.	"Bye Bye Bye (Live)"
3.	"This I Promise You (Live)"
4.	"Bye Bye Bye (Music Video)"
5.	"This I Promise You (Music Video)"
6.	"It's Gonna Be Me (Music Video)"

== Personnel ==
Credits are adapted from the back cover of the DVD Making the Tour.

- Management [Exclusive] – Johnny Wright
- Supervised By [Executive Video] – Janet Kleinbaum

== Charts ==
Chart performance
Chart (2001)	Peak position
UK Music Videos (OCC)	8
US Top Music Videos (Billboard)	1

== Certifications ==
Certifications and sales for Making the Tour
Region	Certification	Certified units/sales
United States (RIAA)	Platinum	100,000^{^}
^{^} Shipments figures based on certification alone.

== Release history ==
Region	Date	Format	Catalogue no.	Label	Ref.
United States	February 6, 2001	VHS	01241-41726-3	Jive Records	
United States	February 13, 2001	DVD	01241-41726-9	Jive Records	
