= PopOdyssey Live =

Video by NSYNC
- Released: March 19, 2002
- Genre: Teen pop; R&B
- Length: 83 minutes
- Label: Jive

NSYNC video chronology
Making the Tour (2001)	PopOdyssey Live (2002)	Most Requested Hit Videos (2003)

PopOdyssey Live is the fourth video release by NSYNC, issued on 2002, by Jive Records. The recording documents the PopOdyssey tour, the concert series promoting their 2001 studio album, Celebrity. The production featured a five-story stage, spectacular visuals, and immersive 5.1 surround sound that critics praised for recreating the live concert experience.

Along with the full performance, the DVD included bonus content like band interviews, behind-the-scenes footage, and a documentary. The $90 million-grossing tour was limited to North America, and the home release became a commercial success, topping Billboard's music videos chart and earning RIAA platinum certification.

== Background and release ==
The PopOdyssey tour was announced in 2001 as a massive production inspired by 2001: A Space Odyssey, featuring a five-story stage and a pop culture theme. The premiere, initially set for May, was postponed due to technical issues. The group performed songs from the Celebrity album before its official release and was joined by opening acts such as Christina Milian, Samantha Mumba and Deborah Gibson. The tour included social initiatives, promotional trailers, and grossed over $90 million, becoming one of the top-grossing tours of the year. Although there were plans to take it internationally, it remained limited to North America. The tour was documented for video during the concert at the Louisiana Superdome in New Orleans. Bandmember JC Chasez mentioned the band chose to film at that venue because rehearsals were held at that facility.

The recording underwent different technical stages because it was intended for release in multiple formats, including European television broadcast, a 5.1 DVD, and digital cinema exhibition. After the show was recorded at the Superdome, the material was taken to Ideas Studios for vocal overdubs and then sent to Skywalker Sound, where it was transferred into Pro Tools and prepared for the various mixes. The first mix completed was a stereo version on a Neve VXS console, which served as the foundation for the subsequent versions. The team then worked on the 5.1 mix in the Mix E room, using a Euphonix System 5 console and exploring the spatial distribution of sonic elements such as instruments and audience noise. For the digital cinema screenings, technical adjustments were required due to the theaters' audio systems, leading to a revision of the stems and a redistribution of frequencies and channels to adapt the final result to the playback environment.

The VHS, entitled *NSYNC: PopOdyssey Live, was released on March 19, 2002. A DVD edition was released on April 23, 2002. The DVD featured the entire concert along with special features, which included: interviews with each bandmember, behind-the-scenes Easter eggs, photo gallery, profile of each musician, web links and a documentary. A special intro video was made for the video release to explain the meaning of the tour name. The original video shown at the beginning of each concert was made available as a special feature.

== Commercial performance ==
In the U.S., the video album peaked at number one on the Billboard Top Music Videos chart. It debuted on the UK Official Music Video Chart on 18th May 2002, entering at its peak position of number 10. The following week, it dropped to number 25 and remained on the chart for two additional weeks, totaling a four-week run. Its final appearance was on 8th June 2002 at number 34 before exiting the chart. The video was certified platinum by the RIAA on May 23, 2002.

== Track listing ==
No.	Title	Length
1.	"PopOdyssey Video"
2.	"Pop"
3.	"Tearin' Up My Heart"
4.	"I Want You Back"
5.	"(God Must Have Spent) A Little More Time on You"
6.	"The Two of Us"
7.	"Space Cowboy Video"
8.	"Space Cowboy (Yippie-Yi-Yay)"
9.	"This I Promise You"
10.	"Gone Video"
11.	"Gone"
12.	"Toy Episode"
13.	"It's Gonna Be Me"
14.	"See Right Through You"
15.	"Up Against The Wall"
16.	"Celebrity Video"
17.	"Celebrity"
18.	"Something Like You"
19.	"Falling"
20.	"Selfish"
21.	"No Strings Attached"
22.	"The Game Is Over"
23.	"Bye Bye Bye"
Total length:		83:00

== Personnel ==
Credits adapted from the back cover of the DVD PopOdyssey Live.

- NSYNC: Justin Timberlake, JC Chasez, Lance Bass, Joey Fatone and Chris Kirkpatrick
- Johnny Wright – Manager/Show Producer
- Kevin Antunes – Musical Director
- Directed by Michael B Borofsky
- Produced by Michael Murphy
- Exclusive Management by Johnny Wright for Wright Entertainment Group

DVD Special Features

- The history of NSYNC!
- Behind The Scenes – the set build and the wardrobe
- Interviews with Justin, Joey, JC, Lance and Chris
- Photo Gallery
- Find the Easter Egg and discover the mystery of the show's opening!
- 5.1 Surround Sound in Dolby Digital
- Approximate running time: 83 minutes
- This DVD is presented in widescreen letterbox format to preserve the aspect ratio of the original program.

== Charts ==
Chart (2002)	Peak position
UK Video Charts	10
US Billboard Top Music Videos	1

== Certifications ==
Certifications and sales for PopOdyssey Live
Region	Certification	Certified units/sales
United States (RIAA)	Platinum	100,000^{^}
^{^} Shipments figures based on certification alone.

== Release history ==
Region	Date	Format	Catalogue no.	Label	Ref.
United States	March 19, 2002	VHS	01241-41778-3	Jive Records	
United States	April 23, 2002	DVD	01241-41778-9	Jive Records	
