= Kish Kash =

Studio album by Basement Jaxx
- Released: 20 October 2003
- Recorded: March 2002 – August 2003
- Studios: Jaxx (Loughborough Junction, London, England)
- Genres: Dance; house; big beat; dance-rock
- Length: 50:45
- Labels: XL; Astralwerks
- Producers: Simon Ratcliffe; Felix Buxton; Meshell Ndegeocello

Basement Jaxx chronology
Rooty (2001)	Kish Kash (2003)	The Singles (2005)

Singles from Kish Kash
- 1. "Lucky Star" Released: 10 November 2003; 2. "Good Luck" Released: 5 January 2004; 3. "Plug It In" Released: 29 March 2004

Kish Kash is the third studio album by English electronic music duo Basement Jaxx, released on 20 October 2003 by XL Recordings and Astralwerks. After a lengthy tour which that led to exhaustion and homesickness, they settled in their new studio and wanted to develop a fresh new approach, less reliant on grooves and samples and more focused on songwriting.

It reached number 17 on the UK Albums Chart. The album was nominated for the Mercury Prize in 2004. It later won the first Grammy Award for Best Dance/Electronic Album in 2005. Three singles were released from the album: "Lucky Star", "Good Luck" and "Plug It In".

== Background and development ==
Returning from their 2001 world tour to promote Rooty with exhaustion and homesickness, Felix and Simon settled into their new Brixton studio. On 23 September 2002, they released a second extended play called Junction, which included four new songs and was named after Loughborough Junction, the place of the duo's original parties. They also remixed Missy Elliott, DJ Sneak and Justin Timberlake while still deciding where to go next.

The recording process took place between March 2002 and August 2003. According to Buxton, the duo undertook the recording of Kish Kash in "a sober state of mind". While making the album, they both stayed away from clubs, preferring to ignore the latest fads in dance culture, wanting to develop a fresh approach, less reliant on grooves and samples and more focused on songwriting, often starting with just a voice and guitar. "We kind of went back to school," said Buxton. "We got this new studio and had to learn how to use it." Added Ratcliffe: "There was a greater sense that we didn't know what we were doing but it was more enjoyable than before."

Buxton also revealed that they were going to name the album Rhapsody, but his father thought that it was "too square" and commented: "It would be okay if [the album] was a rap record about sodomy, but it’s not." Someone else then said that the title was "like a box of chocolates or a Gareth Gates album", so they changed it to Kish Kash before the artwork went to print. The new name was a phrase for money used by one of their friends.

The album was also their last recording with record label Astralwerks, as they announced backstage of the 47th Annual Grammy Awards.

== Content ==
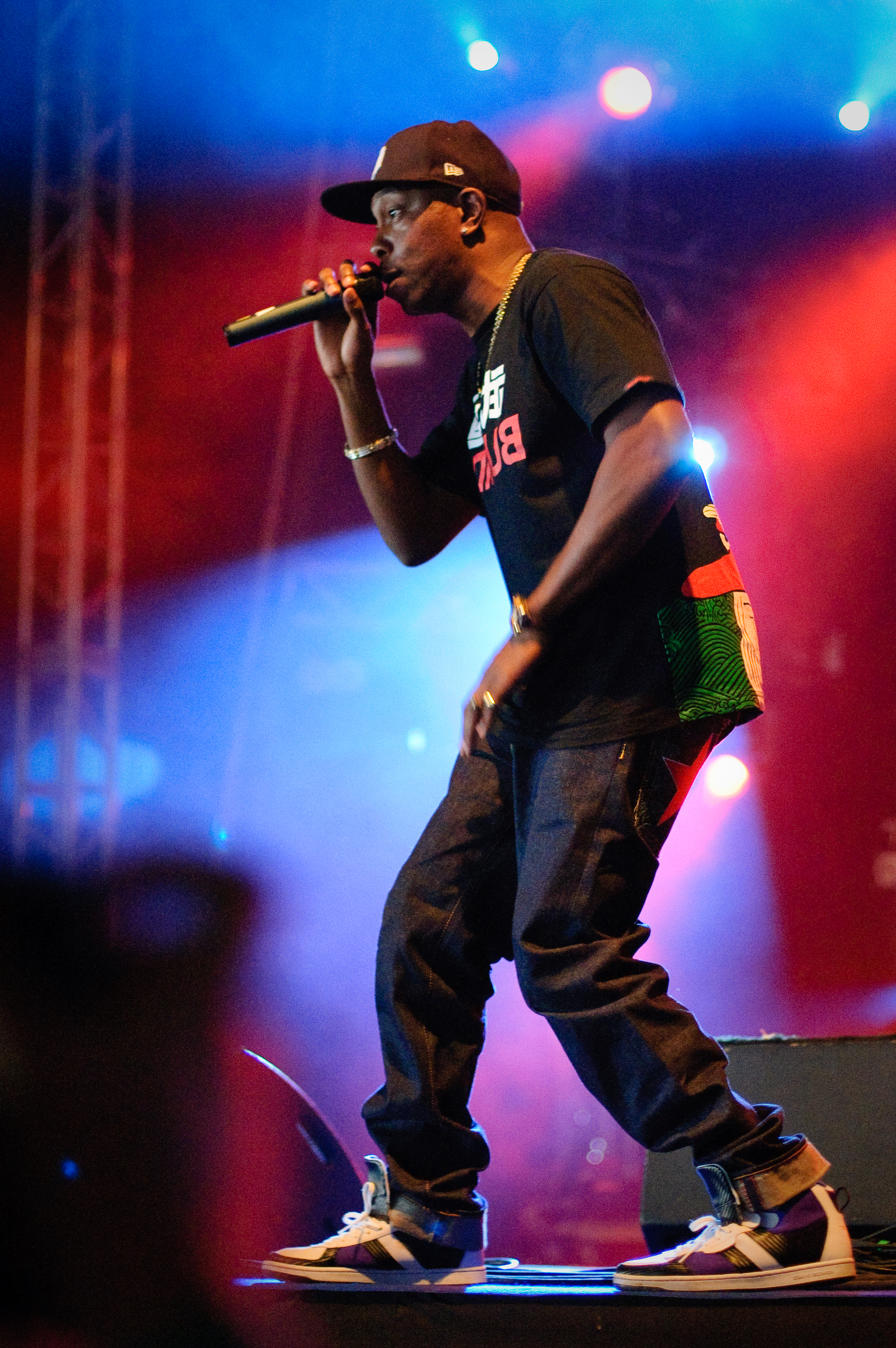
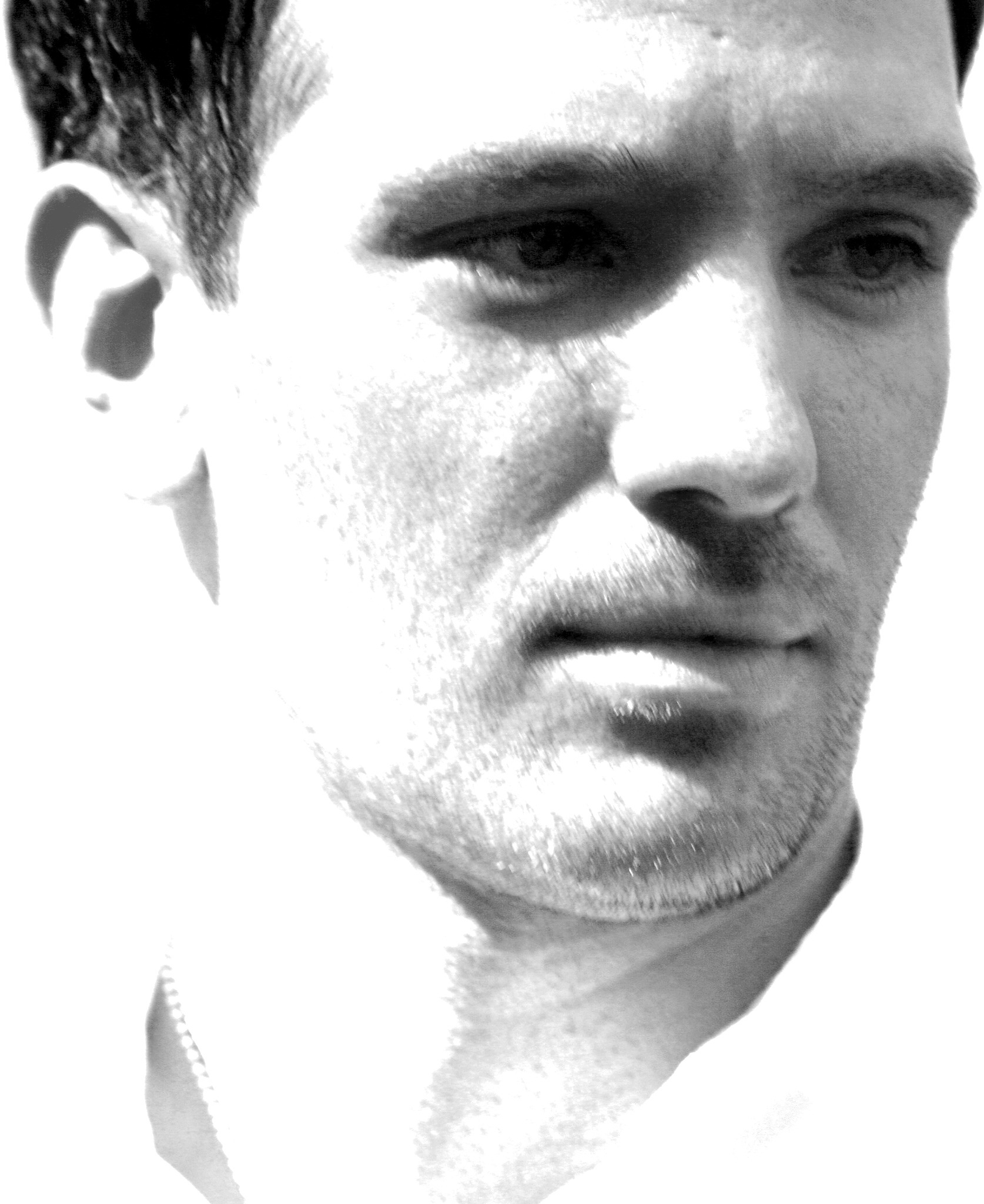
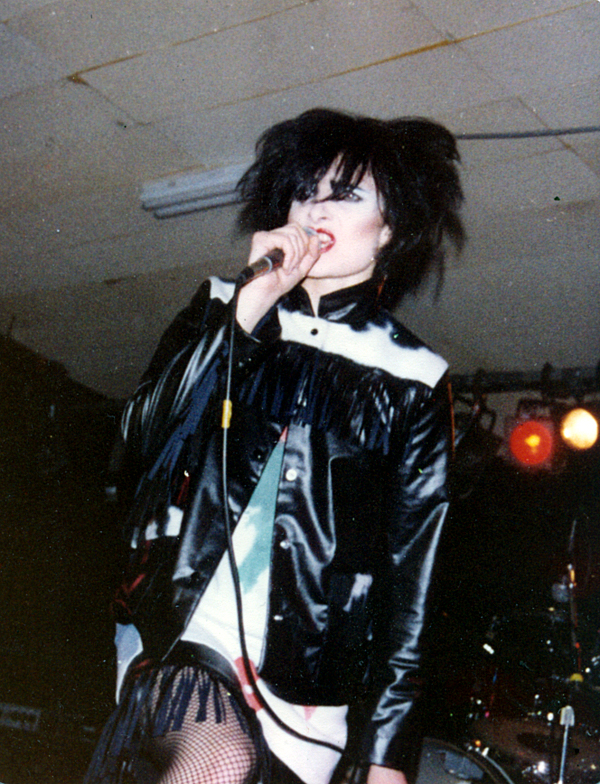
Dizzee Rascal, JC Chasez and Siouxsie Sioux were all featured artists on the album.

The album opens with "Good Luck", with vocals contributed by Lisa Kekaula, a member of the American rock and roll group The Bellrays. The duo decided to collaborate with The London Session Orchestra on the song. Ratcliffe said, "I wanted to make a beautiful song. But I was having a lot of trouble figuring out how to express it." Their manager then suggested that they use an orchestra. "16 people participated in the recording. It was pretty spectacular. They're making real music!"

"Benjilude" features vocals from Joe Benjamin, a 70-year-old Bermudan man "that walks around Brixton with a Stetson hat, a large stick and a kind of poncho." Buxton befriended him when the man used to live there, then he invited him to the studio. "We like interludes; used sparingly and wisely, they help to blend things," said Ratcliffe.

Meshell Ndegeocello was touring in the UK when she worked with the duo on "Right Here's the Spot" and "Feels Like Home". But, on the second day, she felt ill and they had to make her a bed in the vocal booth. She told Windy City Times about her experience working with the duo: "It was good. I had a great time and I enjoyed it very much. It was nice to work with different people. I always enjoy the experience of making music with people". On the making of "Right Here's the Spot", she stated: "I go out (to night clubs) myself and I love that particular genre of music. It was fun." In a 2015 interview with Songwriting Magazine, she recalled the sessions with the duo, stating that they "definitely taught [her] about sonics and sound, and also just the method of singing a lot and letting someone sift through it all and find the phrases which they like. [...] I think that's an amazing way to make songs."

The collaboration between the duo and Phoebe Killdeer came as a suggestion from their record label, as Astralwerks also wanted Killdeer to study the two, despite the fact that she was a singer then herself. Killdeer recorded her part in three hours on an afternoon for the track "Tonight". She later shared: "[It was] fun to work with them. We complemented each other well."

The album's second track, "Right Here's the Spot", is another collaboration with Meshell Ndegeocello. Michaelangelo Matos from The Village Voice, called it "Ndegeocello's Prince-tribute collaboration with Basement Jaxx." "Cish Cash", featuring the voice of Siouxsie Sioux, is a punk-influenced track. The album's concluding track, "Feels Like Home", was claimed by Exclaim.ca's Martin Turenne as "the gloomiest track in Jaxx history" with "a beatless dirge in which grinding electronics buzz" under Meshell Ndegeocello's "mournful" singing. Ernest Hardy from LA Weekly called the song a "dreamy, atmospheric closing number".

The lyrical theme of "Supersonic" is "outer space".

=== Musical style ===
"We wanted get back to the basics of what music was about and why it was important to us. If we had started this album with a carnival-esque house track, that wouldn't have felt fresh for us. We were interested in creating that genre, but not necessarily continuing on with it."

— Buxton on the new musical concept of Kish Kash with Exclaim.ca

Basement Jaxx had previously been inspired by their peers in the dance music scene but, by the time of recording Kish Kash, this had changed. "We were listening to what other people were doing and realizing it was all pretty stagnant and uninspiring," said Simon. "There was nothing to look up to in a way. We had to do something new." Around this time, the duo listened to artists that had "a less direct influence" on the record, including Radiohead, the Neptunes, Timbaland and System of a Down.

Instead of being influenced by artists as they had been in the past, like Prince and Todd Terry, the duo were more influenced by Brian Eno on their third album. "If anything, the new album is more classic in feel, more song-based", Ratcliffe explained to Billboard. "It's more traditional in that respect. It's also a bit more intelligent, which is a very dangerous word to use."

Mark Pytlik from Pitchfork summed up the album's musical genres: "Containing fused-together fragments of disco, electro, acid, Bollywood, new wave, and whatever the hell the incredible 'Living Room' is, Kish Kash's gaudy world collage fell by the wayside next to the minimalist sounds of microhouse and grime."

== Singles ==
The first single released from the album was "Lucky Star" in November 2003. It reached number 23 in the UK charts. The single marked Basement Jaxx's return after a two-year break. The single featured Mercury Music Prize-winning artist Dizzee Rascal and British Bhangra vocalist Mona Singh on the chorus.

"Good Luck" was released in January 2004 and debuted at number 12 in the UK. The lead vocals were sung by Lisa Kekaula, lead singer of US band The Bellrays. "Good Luck" was re-released in July, due to exposure on the BBC coverage of the Euro 2004 television campaign. It reached number 14 that time around.

"Plug It In", the third and final single from the album, was released on 4 April 2004 and debuted at number 22. It featured 'N Sync member JC Chasez (credited as 'J.C. Chasez').

A music video which didn't feature Siouxsie Sioux was also made for "Cish Cash", though it was not released as a single.

== Critical reception ==
Professional ratings
Aggregate scores
Source	Rating
Metacritic	85/100
Review scores
Source	Rating
AllMusic	4.5/5 stars
Blender	4/5 stars
Entertainment Weekly	A−
The Guardian	3/5 stars
NME	6/10
Pitchfork	9.1/10
Q	4/5 stars
Rolling Stone	4/5 stars
Spin	B
Uncut	4/5 stars

Despite being very pleased with the album, the duo expected a critical backlash for its star turns and darker sound. Review aggregator website Metacritic gave the album a score of 85 out of 100, signifying "universal acclaim". "We thought we’d get a kicking", says Buxton, "but it’s gone down well."

Scott Plagenhoef of Pitchfork gave Kish Kash a score of 9.1/10, calling the album "the most propulsive, ferocious music of the year as well as some of the most poignant." David Browne of Entertainment Weekly called it "the richest and most fervent music the Jaxx have ever made". John Davidson of PopMatters called it "their best sustained effort so far." Andy Battaglia of The A.V. Club called it "an album that sets the bar for density and imagination almost unreasonably high." Blender praised the album as "their most violently inventive album yet", while Uncut described it as "a truly exhilarating 50 minutes of music."

Stephen Dalton of NME, on the other hand, called Kish Kash "a naggingly problematic record" with "a void at its heart that no amount of cool celebrity mates can conceal." Dave Simpson of The Guardian was critical of the album's "recurring sense of enforced jollity" and "lame attempts at introspection", but concluded that "anyone left standing on pop's dancefloor will certainly lap this up". AllMusic's John Bush, whilst giving it a very positive review and calling it perhaps the best dance record of 2003, wrote that Kish Kash was "the least imaginative record Basement Jaxx have ever released." Robert Christgau of The Village Voice was more reserved in his praise, giving the album a three-star honorable mention rating, and remarking: "Is that blood the big-time vocalists smear on the tracks, or ichor?"

Complex called the album their last "great project", seeing as their subsequent albums failed to make a mark with critics or the Grammy board.

Ella Eyre said the album was the first she ever bought "because [she] kept stealing [her] mum's and [her mother] hid it from [her]." She also cited Basement Jaxx as one of her musical influences.

== Accolades ==
Kish Kash was included in several year-end lists, including Spin at number 38. It was voted the eighth best album of 2003 in the Pazz & Jop, an annual poll of American critics nationwide, published by The Village Voice.

Vice's electronic music website Thump ranked the album on their list of "99 Greatest Dance Albums of All Time" at number 36, calling it a "propulsive menu of gargantuan electronic overload", while at PopMatters, the album was listed on their "100 Best Albums of the 2000s" list at number 18. Pitchfork ranked Kish Kash and Rooty at 66 and 65, respectively, in its list of the 100 top albums from 2000 to 2004.

While predicting winners of the 47th Annual Grammy Awards' categories, Sal Cinquemani and Paul Henderson from Slant Six Magazine predicted the song's win, with Cinquemani jokingly said: "Do they really need to make room for Kish Kash? I would have thought it was a glock." Their prediction came true as Basement Jaxx became the first ever to win this category. According to Billboard, their win was greeted with "universal applause."

== Track listing ==
Kish Kash track listing
No.	Title	Writer(s)	Length
1.	"Good Luck" (featuring Lisa Kekaula)	Felix Buxton; Kekaula; Simon Ratcliffe	4:42
2.	"Right Here's the Spot" (featuring Meshell Ndegeocello)	Buxton; Ndegeocello; Ratcliffe	4:24
3.	"Benjilude"	Buxton; Ratcliffe	0:09
4.	"Lucky Star" (featuring Dizzee Rascal)	Buxton; Mills; Ratcliffe	4:31
5.	"Petrilude"	Buxton; Ratcliffe	0:10
6.	"Supersonic" (featuring Totlyn Jackson)	Buxton; Charles Campbell; Elwood Haygood; Ratcliffe	5:23
7.	"Plug It In" (featuring JC Chasez)	Buxton; Ratcliffe	4:51
8.	"Cosmolude"	Buxton; Ratcliffe	0:54
9.	"If I Ever Recover"	Buxton; Ratcliffe	3:22
10.	"Cish Cash" (featuring Siouxsie Sioux)	Buxton; Ratcliffe; Sioux	4:18
11.	"Tonight" (featuring Phoebe)	Buxton; Phoebe; Ratcliffe	4:02
12.	"Hot 'n Cold"	Buxton; Ratcliffe	4:00
13.	"Living Room"	Buxton; Ratcliffe	2:25
14.	"Feels Like Home" (featuring Meshell Ndegeocello)	Buxton; Ndegeocello; Ratcliffe	7:26
Total length:			50:45

Japanese edition bonus track
No.	Title	Length
15.	"Acid Luv" (Twilite Mix)	4:23
Total length:		55:08

== Credits and personnel ==
Basement Jaxx

- Felix Buxton – mixing, production, vocals on "If I Ever Recover", "Hot 'n Cold" and "Living Room", artwork
- Simon Ratcliffe – mixing, production

Additional musicians

- Onxy Ashanti – flute on "Right Here's the Spot", electric horns on "Right Here's the Spot" and "Lucky Star"
- Basil – percussion on "Right Here's the Spot"
- Nathan "Tugg" Curran – drums on "Good Luck" and "Cish Cash"
- Simeon Jones – harmonica on "Supersonic"
- The London Session Orchestra – strings on "Good Luck" and "If I Ever Recover"
- Wil Malone – string arrangements and conducting on "Good Luck" and "If I Ever Recover"
- Meshell Ndegeocello – bass guitar and additional production on "Feels Like Home"
- Gavyn Wright – string conducting on "Good Luck" and "If I Ever Recover"

Technical personnel

- Mike Marsh – mastering
- Sue Amaradivakara – sleeve illustrations
- Roger Gorringe – sleeve illustrations
- Phil Lee – artwork assistance

Additional vocalists

- Allonymous – vocals on "Petrilude"
- Natasha Awuku – backing vocals on "Good Luck"
- Joe Benjamin – vocals on "Benjilude" and "Cosmolude"
- JC Chasez – vocals on "Plug It In"
- Cherokee – backing vocals on "Plug It In"
- Harmony in Black – backing vocals on "Right Here's the Spot"
- Sharlene Hector – vocals on "Right Here's The Spot", backing vocals on "Good Luck"
- Totlyn Jackson – vocals on "Supersonic"
- Lisa Kekaula – vocals on "Good Luck"
- Phoebe Killdeer – vocals on "Tonight"
- Francine Kufonji – backing vocals on "Good Luck"
- Xenia Lexis – vocals on "Cish Cash"
- Marsha "Marshmello" Smith – backing vocals on "Lucky Star"
- Mona – vocals on "Lucky Star"
- Meshell Ndegeocello – vocals on "Right Here's the Spot" and "Feels Like Home"
- Emily Oldfield – vocals on "Hot n' Cold"
- Dizzee Rascal – vocals on "Lucky Star"
- Joelle Reefer – backing vocals on "Supersonic"
- Kele Le Roc – backing vocals on "Good Luck"
- Mandy Senior – backing vocals on "Plug It In"
- Siouxsie Sioux – vocals on "Cish Cash"
- Nadia Cielto-Steele – backing vocals on "Good Luck"
- Shelley Thraves – vocals on "Cish Cash"
- Ty – backing vocals on "Plug It In"
- Cassie Watson – backing vocals on "Right Here's the Spot"
- Jason-Anthoney Wright – backing vocals on "Right Here's the Spot" and "Supersonic"

== Charts ==
=== Weekly charts ===
Weekly chart performance for Kish Kash
Chart (2003)	Peak position
Australian Albums (ARIA)	29
Belgian Albums (Ultratop Flanders)	67
Irish Albums (IRMA)	36
New Zealand Albums (RMNZ)	40
UK Albums (Official Charts)	17
US Billboard 200	172
US Top Dance Albums (Billboard)	2
US Heatseekers Albums (Billboard)	5

=== Year-end charts ===
Year-end chart performance for Kish Kash
Chart (2004)	Position
UK Albums (OCC)	157

== Certifications ==
Certifications for Kish Kash
Region	Certification	Certified units/sales
United Kingdom (BPI)	Gold	100,000^{^}
^{^} Shipments figures based on certification alone.
