= Good Luck (Basement Jaxx song) =

2004 single by Basement Jaxx

- Original UK release artwork

Single by Basement Jaxx featuring Lisa Kekaula

from the album Kish Kash
- B-side: "Mere Pass"
- Released: 5 January 2004
- Studio: Jaxx (Loughborough Junction, London, England)
- Length: 4:38 (album version); 3:36 (radio edit)
- Label: XL
- Songwriters: Felix Buxton; Simon Ratcliffe; Lisa Kekaula
- Producer: Basement Jaxx

Basement Jaxx singles chronology
"Lucky Star" (2003)	"Good Luck" (2004)	"Plug It In" (2004)

Lisa Kekaula singles chronology
"Good Luck" (2003)	"U Don't Know Me" (2005)

Alternative cover
- UK re-release artwork featuring Lisa Kekaula in the song's music video

"Good Luck" is a song by British electronic music duo Basement Jaxx featuring vocals from Lisa Kekaula of American band the Bellrays. It was released on 5 January 2004 as the second single from their third studio album, Kish Kash, and reached number 12 on the UK Singles Chart, number two on the US Dance Club Play chart, and number 22 on the Australian ARIA Singles Chart. The song was nominated in the Best Dance Recording category at the 47th Grammy Awards.

== Development ==
"We had to kick it off with something. Whatever we chose people would say, 'That isn't house music.' Who cares?" (Complaints about the lack of house music have appeared on the band's website.) It's a brave track, even more so for including a 16-piece orchestra. But it didn't come easily. "Initially, Lisa sounded like a diva and we didn't want that. With two hours before she had to go back to America, Simon strummed an AC/DC riff and I scribbled down some words and suddenly we had something that didn't sound like a Basement Jaxx record - a rock 'n' roll song which didn't even sound modern."

Buxton said the song was the most difficult track to work on of the album. "That took us ages and we went through loads of processes. It took a long time to get it to its finish point," stated Buxton.

== Critical reception ==
While predicting winners from all of the 47th Annual Grammy Awards' categories, Sal Cinquemani and Eric Henderson from Slant Magazine predicted the song's win, with Henderson calling the song "a fantastic, chugging single that shoves Britney's sex-pixie ditty and the Scissor Sisters's queer-as-milquetoast shtick face down in the dirt."

== Music video ==
A music video was produced to promote the single, filmed in Buenos Aires, Argentina.

== Track listings ==
UK CD single (first release)

1. "Good Luck"
2. "Mere Pass"

UK 12-inch single (first release)

A1. "Good Luck" (Tim Deluxe Funked club mix)
B1. "Mere Pass"
B2. "Good Luck" (Tim Deluxe Funked dub)

UK 12-inch single (Roni Size mixes)

A. "Good Luck" (Roni Size vocal mix)
B. "Good Luck" (Roni Size dancefloor mix)

UK CD single (re-release)

1. "Good Luck"
2. "Cish Cash" (featuring Siouxsie Sioux)

UK 12-inch single (re-release)

A1. "Good Luck"
A2. "Ah-Choo"
B1. "Onyx"

UK 12-inch single (remixes)

A1. "Good Luck" (summer bootleg version)
B1. "Cish Cash" (Vitalic remix)
B2. "Right Here's the Spot" (Switch's Drunk at the Dogstar mix)

Australian and New Zealand CD single

1. "Good Luck" (album version) – 4:27
2. "Mere Pass" – 4:49
3. "Good Luck" (Tim Deluxe Funked club mix) – 7:15
4. "Good Luck" (Tim Deluxe Funked dub) – 6:54
5. "Good Luck" (Roni Size vocal mix) – 4:24
6. "Good Luck" (Roni Size dancefloor mix) – 6:07

== Credits and personnel ==
Credits are adapted from the liner notes of Kish Kash.

Recording and management

- Recorded at Jaxx (Loughborough Junction, London)
- Mastered by Mike Marsh at The Exchange (Camden Town, London)
- Published by Universal Music and Mele Kekaula Music (BMI)

Personnel

- Felix Buxton – mixing, production, songwriting
- Simon Ratcliffe – mixing, production, songwriting
- Lisa Kekaula – vocals, songwriting
- Natasha Awuku – backing vocals
- Sharlene Hector – backing vocals
- Francine Kufonji – backing vocals
- Kele Le Roc – backing vocals
- Nadia Cielto-Steele – backing vocals
- Nathan "Tugg" Curran – drums
- The London Session Orchestra – strings
- Wil Malone – string arrangements and conducting
- Gavyn Wright – string conducting

== Charts ==
=== Weekly charts ===
Chart (2004)	Peak position
Australia (ARIA)	22
Australian Club Chart (ARIA)	1
Australian Dance (ARIA)	2
Belgium (Ultratip Bubbling Under Flanders)	2
Belgium Dance (Ultratop Flanders)	27
Hungary (Dance Top 40)	20
Ireland (IRMA)	28
Ireland Dance (IRMA)	4
Netherlands (Dutch Top 40)	29
Netherlands (Single Top 100)	43
Scottish Singles Sales (Official Charts)	19
UK Singles (Official Charts)	12
UK Dance (Official Charts)	1
UK Indie (Official Charts)	1
US Dance Club Songs (Billboard)	2

=== Year-end charts ===
Chart (2004)	Position
Australian Club Chart (ARIA)	5
Australian Dance (ARIA)	12
US Dance Club Play (Billboard)	11

== Certifications ==
Region	Certification	Certified units/sales
United Kingdom (BPI)	Silver	200,000^{‡}
^{‡} Sales+streaming figures based on certification alone.

== Release history ==
Region	Date	Format(s)	Label(s)	Ref.
United Kingdom	5 January 2004	12-inch vinyl; CD	XL	
Australia	12 January 2004	CD	Remote Control; XL	
United Kingdom (re-release)	28 June 2004	12-inch vinyl; CD	XL	

== In popular culture ==
"Good Luck" featured as the opening theme song to the 2004 CGI anime movie Appleseed and was also featured in the Victoria's Secret fashion show for 2003 and 2005.

A version without lyrics was used during the opening sequence of the BBC's UEFA Euro 2004 television coverage. This spawned a re-release of the original single, and it entered at number 14 on the UK Singles Chart on 4 July 2004. The same instrumental version was later used by BBC Radio Sheffield as the opening theme for their live local football coverage, where it is still in use as of May 2026.

The song appeared on American reality television series Queer Eye for the Straight Guy.
