= Some Girls (Dance with Women) =

Single by JC Chasez

from the album Schizophrenic
- B-side: "Blowin' Me Up"
- Released: November 11, 2003
- Recorded: 2003
- Genre: Pop; dance-pop
- Length: 3:54
- Label: Jive
- Songwriters: JC Chasez; Bradley Daymond; Alex Greggs
- Producer: Riprock 'n' Alex G

JC Chasez singles chronology
"Blowin' Me Up (With Her Love)" (2002)	"Some Girls (Dance with Women)" (2003)	"All Day Long I Dream About Sex" (2004)

Music video
- "Some Girls (Dance With Women)" on YouTube

"Some Girls (Dance with Women)" is a song by American singer JC Chasez from his debut studio album, Schizophrenic. It was released as the lead single from the album in November 2003 in the United States. In the United Kingdom, it was released as a double A-side single with "Blowin' Me Up (With Her Love)". The radio and music video version of the song included a feature from rapper Dirt McGirt (Ol' Dirty Bastard), a remix which is included on Schizophrenic.

== Background ==
Chasez said, "The song "starts off really bouncy, light, almost calypso feeling. And then I added these little flute lines in the B verse that kind of made it really smooth and sexy." Explaining the meaning of the song, Chasez added, "I wanted to have my own club banger, but I didn't want to be too generic. Everybody has a song about poppin' a bottle of champagne and riding in on the rims. So I went through the course of a night out, from start to finish...[Women dancing together] is something everybody talks about and everybody sees, but nobody's done a song about it."

== Music video ==
Chasez exits a car onto a moonlit Prague street, where he is greeted by friends. A lone woman with a long blonde wig catches his attention, and Chasez leaves his friends to follow the woman. After following her past street corners in a cat-and-mouse type of chase, Chasez finds the woman on some stairs, where she is joined by another woman in a similar wig. The two women tease each other and goad Chasez to follow them past a curtain, revealing a trendy, cabaret-style club populated with women. The women inside the club, wearing burlesque costumes, can be seen dancing on each other and some kissing each other, with men observing. This is interspersed with clips of Chasez singing the song on the dance floor with female dancers. At the end of the video, the two women from the beginning take Chasez to a back room and tease him. Chasez is seen leaving the club, saying goodbye to the women in his car and driving off.

The music video was filmed mostly in Los Angeles, with Dirt's cameo shot in New York City. The video was directed by Martin Weisz, best known for Korn's "Make Me Bad" video. Chasez said, "Everything was done in good taste. I shot it with a very European feel. I didn't want it to be overly flashy and look like every video. It's a narrative in that I'm the voyeur, watching the action. It moves [from the street] into a ballroom, but it's not a club scene. It's like a costume party, a Baroque period kind of feel, with white wigs and white makeup."

== Reception ==
Keith Caulfield of Billboard wrote "Some Girls (Dance With Women)" is a "simmering, uptempo hip-pop track. Chasez's subtle and sexed-up vocals are coupled with lyrics that are guaranteed to react with listeners. The song wears well with repeat plays; by the third time around, the chorus is fully lodged in the brain." Joan Anderman of The Boston Globe called the song "a jungly clutch of rhythms iced with an itchy-sweet melody, part conga line, part pop tune. It's sexy and silly and funky in a George Michael sort of way." In a retrospective piece for Billboard, Bianca Gracie noted the song "had all the potential to become a surefire hit, from JC’s come-hither vocals to the snakecharmer hypnosis of the production." The song peaked at #88 on the Billboard Hot 100. In 2017, Spin included the song among its list of best boy band solo debut singles.

The song's lack of success on the charts has been attributed to the content of the song, which is seen as fetishizing bisexuality for the male gaze, a theme that was also used in the criticized song "Both Ways" by former One Direction member Liam Payne.

== Track listing ==
USA Promotional Single

1. "Some Girls (Dance with Women)" [Radio Edit - No Rap] – 3:33
2. "Some Girls (Dance with Women)" [Radio Edit - No Rap Extended Version] – 3:53
3. "Some Girls (Dance with Women)" [Radio Edit - With Rap] – 3:54

UK CD1

1. "Some Girls (Dance with Women)" [Radio Edit - Feat. Dirt McGirt] – 3:54
2. "Blowin' Me Up (With Her Love)" [Radio Edit] – 4:18

UK CD2

1. "Some Girls (Dance with Women)" [Radio Edit - No Rap] – 3:33
2. "Some Girls (Dance with Women)" [Mike Rizzo Club Mix] – 8:19
3. "Some Girls (Dance with Women)" [Orange Factory Extended Radio Mix] – 4:58
4. "Some Girls (Dance with Women)" [Thick Dub] – 8:07

UK 12" Vinyl

1. "Some Girls (Dance with Women)" [Radio Edit - Feat. Dirt McGirt] – 3:54
2. "Some Girls (Dance with Women)" [Mike Rizzo Club Mix] – 8:19
3. "Some Girls (Dance with Women)" [Orange Factory Extended Radio Mix] – 4:58
4. "Some Girls (Dance with Women)" [Thick Dub] – 8:07

== Charts ==
Chart (2004)	Peak
Ireland (IRMA)	20
UK Singles Chart	13
U.S. Top 40 Mainstream	30
U.S. Billboard Hot 100	88
