= Lucky Star (Basement Jaxx song) =

2003 single by Basement Jaxx

Single by Basement Jaxx featuring Dizzee Rascal

from the album Kish Kash
- Released: 10 November 2003
- Length: 3:12 (edit); 3:54 (2005)
- Label: XL
- Songwriters: Felix Buxton; Simon Ratcliffe; Dylan Mills
- Producer: Basement Jaxx

Basement Jaxx singles chronology
"Do Your Thing" (2002)	"Lucky Star" (2003)	"Good Luck" (2003)

Dizzee Rascal singles chronology
"Fix Up, Look Sharp" (2003)	"Lucky Star" (2003)	"Jus' a Rascal" (2003)

"Lucky Star" is a song by British electronic music duo Basement Jaxx. It was released as a single from their third studio album, Kish Kash. The song features grime artist Dizzee Rascal and Mona Singh, the daughter of Channi Singh. It was released under XL Recordings, the same label Dizzee Rascal himself was on at the time of release. It was released as a 12-inch single and reached number 23 on the UK Singles Chart. A music video was produced to promote the single.

== Development ==
"It's different from anything we've ever done before..." Felix from Basement Jaxx on the new single and album.
"They just said they wanted to work so we went there and it didn't take long about 20 minutes. I went back a couple of months later and finished it off. We connected well, it was amazing. I'd never heard myself on something that big before - it was two worlds colliding and the outcome was heavy." Dizzee Rascal on working with Basement Jaxx.

== Reception ==
AllMusic's John Bush stated: "Teenage garage-rap sensation Dizzee Rascal turns in a fabulous outré performance on "Lucky Star," but the Indian film sample driving the song displays Basement Jaxx in a light they've never been in before: behind the times."

While comparing the album's sound to "the aural equivalent of Shiva's rainbow cumshot," Mark Pytlik from Pitchfork Media stated: "Oh well-- at least Felix and Simon had the good sense to dress Dizzee up in pretty colors while they had him."

== Music video ==
The video for "Lucky Star" was directed by Katie Dawson and shot at London-based Camden Studio, with a guest appearance by Rascal. Dawson was picked directly from the duo after they saw her directorial work for MTV and wanted to create something similar.

Dawson stated the video was "the quickest turnaround job" she has ever worked on. "I was approached late in the day on a Thursday. The band wanted to see a treatment by Friday morning. They loved it and gave the go-ahead to shoot the following Wednesday," she said. Later on, the casting for a belly dancer, martial arts expert, gymnast, rocket girl, breakdancer with booking crew and studio were all finished within two days.

A chroma key studio background from the Camden Studio was used. After shooting the green screen shots, the duo needed the edit complete with all compositing and animations finished by the following week.

"Sticking Dizzee's head on a radioactive child's dancing body was never going to be straightforward, but I've always said directing is a group effort and with something this complicated having a great team around you made it enjoyable even though I didn't get much sleep that week," Dawson said.

== Charts ==
Chart (2003–2004)	Peak position
Australia (ARIA)	76
Ireland Dance (IRMA)	6
Scotland Singles (OCC)	36
UK Singles (OCC)	23
UK Dance (OCC)	1
UK Indie (OCC)	2
US Dance Club Songs (Billboard)	3

== Release history ==
Region	Date	Format(s)	Label(s)	Ref.
United Kingdom	10 November 2003	12-inch vinyl; CD	XL	
Australia	17 November 2003	CD	Remote Control; XL	
