= Blowin' Me Up (With Her Love) =

2002 song by JC Chasez

Single by JC Chasez

from the album Drumline and Schizophrenic
- Released: December 3, 2002
- Recorded: 2002
- Genre: Dance-pop; hip hop
- Length: 4:50
- Label: Jive/Zomba
- Songwriters: Dallas Austin; JC Chasez
- Producer: Dallas Austin

JC Chasez singles chronology
"Blowin' Me Up (With Her Love)" (2002)	"Some Girls (Dance with Women)" (2004)

Music video
- "Blowin' Me Up (With Her Love)" on YouTube

"Blowin' Me Up (With Her Love)" is the debut solo single by American singer JC Chasez. The song was released as a single from the soundtrack to the 2002 film Drumline and was included on Chasez's 2004 debut studio album Schizophrenic. In the United Kingdom, the single was released as a double A-side with Chasez's following single, "Some Girls (Dance with Women)" in February 2004.

The song was written by Chasez and Dallas Austin, the latter having produced the Drumline film. In keeping with the theme of the movie, the beat contains drums and band instruments. The music video was released on December 12, 2002.

== Background ==
In 2002, JC Chasez's band *NSYNC was on a hiatus. During the hiatus, Chasez continued work as a songwriter while also considering acting in movies. While working with Dallas Austin on songs for the Drumline movie, Austin urged Chasez to sing on the track and to consider recording a solo album, which would become his album Schizophrenic.

== Music video ==
Chasez singing with a marching band.

The music video appears to be set in a post-apocalyptic world. Chasez sings the song with a marching band in the background, played by the RCC Marching Band. He also pursues his love interest (Tara Reid) at a monster truck rally, a run-down diner, and a car junkyard. Initially the woman is not interested in Chasez, but has a change of heart midway and straddles him on the diner's counter. Chasez competes in a drag race and celebrates with his newfound love afterwards. The video also features a dance routine by Chasez and several backup dancers. Melissa Smith stars in the video as a girl dancing at the monster truck rally. Dallas Austin, who co-produced the single, appears in the video driving a monster truck and smashing cars. The music video premiered on Total Request Live on December 12, 2002.

The music video for "Blowin' Me Up (with Her Love)" was directed by Bryan Barber and shot in 2002 in the San Fernando Valley. JC approached Barber after seeing his video for OutKast, Killer Mike and Joi's "The Whole World." "It's totally different from what he's done with *NSYNC," the director said. "He wanted to go left of center and that's what we did. We had some fun and presented JC in a whole new way." Barber described the video as a "rock-and-roll version of Mad Max," with pyrotechnics, a demolition derby, and drag racing. The video was nominated for an MTV Video Music Award in 2003 for Best Video from a Film.

== Reception ==
The song was a modest hit, peaking at number 35 on the Billboard Hot 100 the week of February 28, 2003, and remaining on the chart for 17 weeks. Positive reviews noted, "The bass is loud and pulsating and provides the perfect dance song,” and praised Chasez's vocal talents, saying "He starts off the song singing in a kind of whispery, yet seductive, tone and then progresses to full-out yelling in the chorus. He even pulls the yelling off, and his vocals come damn close to those of Prince." In a more critical review, Chuck Taylor of Billboard wrote, “the song has no discernible direction and [is] a grossly unconvincing turn toward hip-hop for Chasez.”

== Live performances ==
Chasez performed the song live on his Schizophrenic club tour. He also performed the song at Wango Tango, Z100's Zootopia, and Top of the Pops with a marching band. Chasez was set to sing "Blowin' Me Up (With Her Love)" at the 2004 Pro Bowl's halftime show, altering the song to accommodate the NFL's concerns; however, he was unceremoniously dropped days before the performance in the wake of the Super Bowl XXXVIII halftime controversy.

== Track listing ==
USA Promotional Single #1

1. "Blowin' Me Up (With Her Love)" [Radio Edit] – 4:21
2. "Blowin' Me Up (With Her Love)" [Radio Edit No Intro] – 3:57

USA Promotional Single #2

1. "Blowin' Me Up (With Her Love)" [Radio Edit] – 4:21
2. "Blowin' Me Up (With Her Love)" [Instrumental] – 4:49

USA Promotional 12" Vinyl

1. "Blowin' Me Up (With Her Love)" [Radio Edit] – 4:21
2. "Blowin' Me Up (With Her Love)" [Radio Edit No Intro] – 3:57
3. "Blowin' Me Up (With Her Love)" [Album Version] – 4:50
4. "Blowin' Me Up (With Her Love)" [Instrumental] – 4:49

== Charts ==
Chart (2003)	Peak
Canadian Singles Chart	24
U.S. Billboard Hot 100	35
U.S. Top 40 Mainstream	14
U.S. Top 40 Tracks	17
Chart (2004)	Peak
Irish Singles Chart	20*
UK Official Singles Chart	13*
