= Drumline (film) =

2002 American film directed by Charles Stone III

- Theatrical release poster
- Directed by: Charles Stone III
- Written by: Tina Gordon Chism; Shawn Schepps
- Produced by: Dallas Austin; Timothy M. Bourne; Wendy Finerman; Jody Gerson; Greg Mooradian
- Starring: Nick Cannon; Zoe Saldaña; Orlando Jones
- Cinematography: Shane Hurlbut
- Edited by: Patricia Bowers; Bill Pankow
- Music by: John Powell
- Production companies: Fox 2000 Pictures; Wendy Finerman Productions
- Distributed by: 20th Century Fox
- Release date: December 13, 2002
- Running time: 118 minutes
- Country: United States
- Language: English
- Budget: $20 million
- Box office: $57.6 million

Drumline is a 2002 American coming-of-age teen comedy-drama film directed by Charles Stone III. The screenplay, which was inspired by the Southwest Dekalb High School Marching Panthers in Decatur, Georgia, was written by Tina Gordon Chism and Shawn Schepps. The film follows a young drummer from New York, played by Nick Cannon, who enters the fictional Atlanta A&T University and bumps heads with the leader of his new school's drum section. Zoe Saldaña, and Orlando Jones co-star.

The film received generally positive reviews from critics, with most of them praising the musical bands' overall performances. It was a success at the box office, earning over $56 million in the U.S., and almost $1.2 million in foreign markets.

A direct sequel Drumline: A New Beat, premiered on VH1 on October 27, 2014.

== Plot ==
Upon graduating from high school, Devon Miles heads to Atlanta, Georgia to attend Atlanta A&T University, a historically black college that takes enormous pride in its marching band. Devon was personally invited to attend on a full scholarship by Dr. Lee, head of the band, for his prodigious talents. The A&T band separates itself from its competitors by requiring all members to read music, by focusing on various styles of music rather than what is currently popular on the radio, and by dedication to the teamwork emphasized "one band, one sound" concept. Preseason band camp is physically and mentally challenging, designed to push members past their limits. At the end of preseason, the musicians audition for spots on the field, and Devon is the only freshman to make P1, the highest-level player. Devon finds time to romance an upperclassman dancer, Laila.

Sean, Devon's percussion leader, grows weary of Devon's cockiness and challenges him to take a solo in his first game, believing he will panic and be embarrassed. Sean is shocked and subsequently humiliated when Devon takes the solo, upsetting Dr. Lee. As punishment, Dr. Lee orders Sean to clean the drums. This sets up some tension in the drumline which is exacerbated when Dr. Lee is told by school president Wagner to change his focus from music to entertainment or risk losing funding. Lee does not want to give Devon more playing time because of his lack of respect and selfish attitude. Upon learning he lied on his college application about knowing how to read music, Devon is demoted to P4 by Dr. Lee until he learns, but reluctantly gives him his P1 spot back when Wagner pressures Dr. Lee. Devon inflames a fight with a visiting band at A&T's homecoming game and is expelled from the band by Dr. Lee. The fight also strains his relationship with Laila, as she is embarrassed to introduce him to her parents, who attended the game.

Devon contacts A&T's rival school Morris Brown College, to discuss playing for their band next season. Mr. Wade, Brown's band leader, says that Devon does not need to know how to read music and will likely get a full scholarship and a good position on the drumline. When Wade wants to know what Dr. Lee is planning for the BET Big Southern Classic (a large competition of college bands), Devon realizes Mr. Wade was trying to use him to steal A&T's performance plans, and that his heart and honor are still with the A&T band. He rejects the scholarship offer from Brown and returns to A&T.

Though Devon is still not playing for the band, he refuses to give up his drumming. After receiving cassette tapes from his estranged father, Ray, Devon gets inspiration for new drum arrangements. As Devon goes to present these ideas to the band, he and Sean have a confrontation that clears the air and they begin to work together. The two present their idea for an entrance cadence to Dr. Lee who decides to use them for the Classic. Devon helps the band prepare for the Classic and patches up his relationship with Laila. In appreciation for all his help getting the band ready for the Classic and impressed with Devon's maturing and growth, Dr. Lee tells Devon he can return to the band the following school year.

At the Classic, the bands perform a mixture of popular songs. Morris Brown's band has rapper Petey Pablo perform during their routine. A&T is not fazed by this and performs their mix of retro and current sounds. A tie results in the Morris Brown and A&T drumlines face off. Dr. Lee allows Devon to play for this face-off, showing his faith in Devon's improved character. Morris Brown goes first and A&T responds. Morris Brown's second cadence includes their snares moving forward and playing on the A&T drums (the same move that incited the fight at A&T's homecoming game), then throwing down their sticks. The A&T line holds their composure in the face of the insult. They play their cadence and, in the middle, throw down their sticks, mimicking the Morris Brown actions, but then the entire line pulls out another set of sticks and continues playing. They end their routine in the faces of the Morris Brown drumline, but instead of playing on their drums, the line all drop their sticks onto the other drumline's drums. The judges award the win to A&T.

== Cast ==
- Nick Cannon as Devon Miles
- Zoe Saldaña as Laila
- Orlando Jones as Dr. Lee
- Leonard Roberts as Sean Taylor
- Jason Weaver as Ernest
- J. Anthony Brown as Mr. Wade
- Afemo Omilami as President Wagner
- GQ as Jayson
- Earl Poitier as Charles
- Candace Carey as Diedre
- Angela Gibbs as Dorothy Miles
- Petey Pablo as himself
- Blu Cantrell as herself

== Production ==
Director Stone originally wanted Khalil Kain for the role of Sean. The role of Devon came down between Cannon and Lee Thompson Young. T.I. and Lil Wayne also auditioned. The role of Laila came down to Saldaña and Kerry Washington.

== Release ==
=== Home media ===
The film was released on VHS and in fullscreen and widescreen editions on DVD April 15, 2003. A "special edition" DVD version of the film was later released on December 6, 2011. The film was released in the Blu-ray format on January 27, 2009.

== Critical reception ==
On Rotten Tomatoes, the film has an approval rating of 82% based on reviews from 84 critics. The site's consensus states: "Essentially a sports movie with drums, the energetic Drumline somehow manages to make the familiar seem fresh." At Metacritic, the film has averaged a 63 out of 100 rating from critics, based on 28 reviews. Audiences polled by CinemaScore gave the film a rare "A+" grade.

At Yahoo! Movies, the film has been given a B average based on 14 reviews from critics, and a B− by over 30,000 users. The film was given 3½ stars at Allmovie, where reviewer Josh Ralske gave positive note to the performances of the main cast and Stone's direction but still called the plot "formulaic."

Natasha Grant at BlackFilm.com called the movie "irresistible," "wonderfully crafted," and "fascinating." For the Chicago Sun-Times, Roger Ebert gave the film 3 out of 4 stars, giving the film credit as being "entertaining" and "admirable." At the Los Angeles Times, Kenneth Turan believed the film to be entertaining, although he states that the plot is "way-familiar." Writing for The New York Times, A. O. Scott, while feeling the movie had a "skimpy, hectic plot," still believed the film to be "bouncy, boisterous and charming," and the play of the marching bands to be "downright thrilling." Mike Clark at USA Today awarded the film two and a half of four stars, feeling the film to be conventional but competent, and giving particular positive note to J. Anthony Brown, Orlando Jones, and Leonard Roberts performances. One of the film's negative reviews came courtesy of David Levine at FilmCritic.com. Giving the film 2.5 out of 5 stars, Levine called the screenplay "standard formula" and "predictable," and went on to say that it was unfunny as well as uninspiring, though he gave praise to the precision and artistry of the marching bands.

=== Awards and nominations ===
Year	Award	Category	Recipients	Result
2003	Black Reel Awards	Best Breakthrough Performance, Viewer's Choice	Nick Cannon	Nominated
2003	Black Reel Awards	Best Director (Theatrical)	Charles Stone III	Nominated
2003	Motion Picture Sound Editors, USA	Best Sound Editing in a Feature (Music/Musical)	Bunny Andrews, Mick Gormaley, Nicholas Meyers, Lee Scott	Nominated
2003	MTV Movie Awards	Best Kiss	Nick Cannon, Zoe Saldana	Nominated
2003	MTV Movie Awards	Breakthrough Male Performance	Nick Cannon	Nominated
2003	NAACP Image Awards	Outstanding Motion Picture		Nominated
2003	Phoenix Film Critics Society Awards	Overlooked Film of the Year		Nominated
2003	Teen Choice Awards	Choice Movie, Drama/Action Adventure		Nominated
2003	Teen Choice Awards	Choice Movie Actor, Drama/Action Adventure	Nick Cannon	Nominated
2003	Teen Choice Awards	Choice Movie Breakout Star, Male	Nick Cannon	Nominated

== Soundtrack ==
Drumline (soundtrack)

Soundtrack album by Various Artists
- Released: December 10, 2002
- Genres: Hip hop, R&B
- Length: 61:31
- Label: Jive
- Producers: Dallas Austin (exec.), Big Bob, InfaRed, Jazze Pha, Cliff Jones, Alicia Keys, John Powell

Professional ratings
Review scores
Source	Rating
AllMusic	link

The film's soundtrack was also executive produced by Dallas Austin. Released December 10, 2002, it reached the number 61 spot on Billboard's Top R&B/Hip-Hop Albums chart, number 10 on the Top Soundtracks list, and peaked at 133 on The Billboard 200 in 2003. The tracks "I Want a Girl Like You," "Blowin' Me Up (With Her Love)," and "Club Banger" were all released as singles, with JC Chasez' "Blowin' Me Up..." obtaining the highest level of success, reaching the number 24 spot on the Canadian Singles Chart, number 17 on the Top 40 Tracks chart, and number 14 on the Top 40 Mainstream chart.

#	Title	Performer(s)	Time
1	"D&K Cadence"	A&T Drumline "The Senate"	0:28
2	"Been Away"	Q "The Kid" feat. Jermaine Dupri	3:50
3	"I Want a Girl Like You"*	Joe feat. Jadakiss	3:59
4	"Blowin' Me Up (With Her Love)"*	JC Chasez	4:50
5	"Club Banger"*	Petey Pablo	3:49
6	"Faithful to You"	Syleena Johnson	3:30
7	"Butterflyz [Krucialkeys Remix]"	Alicia Keys	4:12
8	"Uh Oh"	Monica	3:39
9	"My Own Thing"	Raheem DeVaughn	3:58
10	"What You Waitin' For"	Nivea	3:35
11	"Peanuts"	Nappy Roots	4:35
12	"I'm Scared of You"	Nick Cannon	4:00
13	"Shout It Out"	Too $hort & Bun B	4:47
14	"Let's Go"	Trick Daddy feat. Deuce Poppi, Tre + 6, and Unda Presha	4:11
15	"Marching Band Medley" James Brown Petey Pablo	Bethune Cookman College Marching Band, A&T	4:04
16	"The Classic Drum Battle"	Morris Brown College Drumline, A&T Drumline "The Senate"	4:04

(*): Indicates songs were released as singles

== Sequel ==
A direct sequel Drumline: A New Beat, premiered on VH1 on October 27, 2014. Cannon reprises his role as Devon, albeit as a supporting character rather than the protagonist. Roberts also reprises his role of Sean Taylor.

== See also ==
- List of American films of 2002
- Drumline
- Honda Battle of the Bands, the real-life inspiration for the Big Southern Classic in the film
