= Alex Greggs =

Canadian songwriter, record producer, and remixer

Alex Greggs is a Canadian songwriter, record producer, and remixer. He has worked with some of the biggest names in pop and hip hop. He started as a leading producer in the Canadian music scene, notably for Love Inc. Then he branched to more international status with writing for many renowned artists, most notably 'N Sync.

Now based in Hollywood, California, he has also co-written more recently with Beau Dozier and wrote the song "China Funk" for the 2009 film Push.

He is co-owner of South Rakkas Crew record label, along with the label's creator Dennis 'D-Rakkas' Shaw, an influential label in Electro and Dancehall music on Diplo's Mad Decent label. He is also co-founder of Riprock 'n' Alex G Productions with fellow musician Brad Daymond (also known as "Riprock") and a former band member of Love Inc.

MusicFreedom.com, a brainchild of Alex Greggs, was launched in August 2005 as an online music community dedicated to helping unsigned acts get noticed. The privately held company is backed by Greggs with two co-founder partners, Bill Marquez, CEO of search engine Netster.com, and *NSYNC's JC Chasez, as an alternative to iTunes and other music download sites.

Greggs is frequently credited as Alex G, part of the Electro-Dancehall production team South Rakkas Crew, and is also part of the pop dance production team Doman & Gooding.

In February 2009, Greggs signed an international co-publishing deal with ole and its music-publishing co-venture tanjola (also known as ole/tanjola) and soon after an American deal with Universal Republic, home to artists Colbie Caillat, 3 Doors Down, Amy Winehouse and others.

In 2010, Alex signed with New Heights Entertainment and is managed by Alan Melina, who also represents RedOne.

He also worked as a composer of Disney XD's original series, Counterfeit Cat with Drew Snyder.

== Writing credits ==
- 'N Sync most notably co-writing and production of several songs on the albums No Strings Attached and Celebrity
- Keshia Chanté
- JC Chasez
- Paris Hilton
- Blake Lewis
- Love Inc.
- Brandy
- Justin Timberlake
- Ray J
- Lady Gaga
- M.I.A.
- Michael Jackson
- Janet Jackson
- Lil Jon
- T-Pain
- Celine Dion
- John Lennon
- Etta James

== Production and mixing ==
A.D.D. (Audio Day Dream), Christina Aguilera, Lily Allen, Beck, Chris Brown, Duran Duran, Janet Jackson, Michael Jackson, M.I.A., Shakaya, Jessica Simpson, Britney Spears, Pink, Shakira, Justin Timberlake, T-Pain, Tata Young, Tricky.
