= Plug It In (song) =

2004 single by Basement Jaxx

Single by Basement Jaxx featuring JC Chasez

from the album Kish Kash
- B-side: "Rendez-Vu" (remix)
- Released: 29 March 2004
- Studio: Jaxx (Loughborough Junction, London, England)
- Length: 4:51 (album version); 3:20 (single edit)
- Label: XL
- Songwriters: Felix Buxton; Simon Ratcliffe
- Producer: Basement Jaxx

Basement Jaxx singles chronology
"Good Luck" (2004)	"Plug It In" (2004)	"Oh My Gosh" (2005)

JC Chasez singles chronology
"All Day Long I Dream About Sex" (2004)	"Plug It In" (2004)	"Animal" (2012)

Music video
- "Plug It In" on YouTube

"Plug It In" is a song by British electronic music duo Basement Jaxx featuring American singer JC Chasez, formerly of NSYNC. It was released on 29 March 2004 as the third single from their album third studio album, Kish Kash (2003), and debuted at its peak of number 22 in the United Kingdom the following month. The song also charted in Australia and Ireland, reaching numbers 43 and 45 respectively. There are various versions of the song, including a radio edit which was featured on the duo's first greatest-hits album, The Singles (2005).

== Background and development ==
JC Chasez was said to be "in town looking for producers for his own album." Felix Buxton admits to The Scotsman that they initially did not think the collaboration with Chasez would work. "We thought he would be just another puppet who wanted to sound cool so he could be liked by tastemakers. But he was very humble and understood the irony of taking on a song about the masquerade of celebrity because it could have been written about him. And what's more, he's got a great voice."

Lisa Kekaula from Los Angeles, California, planned to sing "Plug It In", but it did not work out, so they wrote a new song for her on the spot: "Good Luck". "We thought we'd better write a song otherwise we've wasted all our money," said Felix.

== Critical reception ==
John Bush from AllMusic picked the song as one of the highlights of Kish Kash, stating that Chasez "is a surprising success" on the song and calling it "beguiling." Paul Mulvey of NME wrote the track, in other hands, "would result in shambles. But Basement Jaxx have a knack of orchestrating wreckage like few other producers, and this is a mighty record: brash, audacious, heroically over-excited." A Pitchfork review said the song "bathes Chasez in a tide of sighs, brutish synths and whipsmart drum breaks."

== Music video ==
The music video, directed by Traktor, takes place at a factory. The factory, called "Second Hand Super Models", manufactures lifelike female robots. Basement Jaxx play two security guards at the facility. The boss of the company hires a salesman played by Chasez to advertise the robots on TV. When Chasez agrees to do the commercial, the boss puts on a pig mask and makes Chasez wear one too. The video shows footage from Chasez's commercials, which are styled like as seen on TV ads. After watching the commercials on their security cameras, the two guards test out the new robots on the factory floor. The guards eventually go too far with the controls, causing the robots to malfunction and catch fire. The boss runs in horrified to see the destruction, and puts his pig mask back on as he mourns what is left of the robots.

== Track listings ==
UK CD single

1. "Plug It In" (featuring JC Chasez)
2. "Rendez-Vu" (Roger's Secret mix)

UK 12-inch single

A1. "Plug It In" (extended club house mix)
A2. "Rendez-Vu" (Roger's Secret mix)
B1. "Plug It In" (Armand van Helden remix)

UK DVD single

1. "Plug It In" (video)
2. "Plug It In" (Tab mix audio)

Australian and New Zealand CD single

1. "Plug It In" (radio edit featuring JC Chasez)
2. "Rendez-Vu" (Roger's Secret mix)
3. "Plug It In" (Tab mix)
4. "Plug It In" (Armand van Helden remix)
5. "Plug It In" (extended house mix)

== Credits and personnel ==
Credits are adapted from the liner notes of Kish Kash.

Recording and management

- Recorded at Jaxx (Loughborough Junction, London)
- Mastered by Mike Marsh at The Exchange (Camden Town, London)
- Published by Universal Music

Personnel

- Felix Buxton – mixing, production, songwriting
- Simon Ratcliffe – mixing, production, songwriting
- JC Chasez – vocals
- Cherokee – backing vocals
- Mandy Senior – backing vocals
- Ty – backing vocals

== Charts ==
=== Weekly charts ===
Chart (2004)	Peak position
Australia (ARIA)	43
Australian Club Chart (ARIA)	2
Australian Dance (ARIA)	6
Ireland (IRMA)	45
Ireland Dance (IRMA)	6
Scotland Singles (OCC)	19
UK Singles (OCC)	22
UK Dance (OCC)	1
UK Indie (OCC)	2

=== Year-end charts ===
Chart (2004)	Position
Australian Club Chart (ARIA)	25

== Release history ==
Region	Date	Format(s)	Label(s)	Ref.
United Kingdom	29 March 2004	12-inch vinyl; CD; DVD	XL	
Australia	3 May 2004	CD	Remote Control; XL	
