= JC Chasez =

American singer (born 1976)

- Chasez in 2026

Background information
- Also known as: JC
- Born: Joshua Scott Chasez; August 8, 1976 (age 50); Washington, D.C., U.S.
- Genres: Pop; R&B; soul
- Occupations: Singer; songwriter; dancer; record producer; actor
- Instrument: Vocals
- Years active: 1991–present
- Labels: RCA; Jive/Zomba; Center Stage Records
- Formerly of: NSYNC

Joshua Scott "JC" Chasez (/ˈʃɑːzeɪ/; born August 8, 1976) is an American singer, songwriter, actor, dancer, and record producer. He started his career as a singer, actor, and dancer on The All-New Mickey Mouse Club before rising to prominence as a member of the boy band NSYNC in the late 90s and early 2000s. The band has sold over 70 million records, becoming one of the best-selling boy bands of all time. Chasez released his debut single "Blowin' Me Up (With Her Love)" in 2002, following NSYNC's decision to go on a hiatus earlier that year. Schizophrenic, his debut solo album, was released in 2004. Chasez has written and produced for a wide variety of music acts such as Liam Payne, Diplo, Backstreet Boys, McFly, The Cheetah Girls, Sugababes, Victoria Duffield, and Matthew Morrison. He also served as a judge on the first seven seasons of America's Best Dance Crew.

== Early life ==
Joshua Scott Chasez was born on August 8, 1976, in Washington, D.C. (Note: "I was born in George Washington [University] Hospital and was raised in the city until I was 5 years old", the former 'N Sync singer told us yesterday, adding that his family then moved to Bowie. "Yeah, man. It was a great childhood. This is the area I know. I'm here every Christmas.") When he was five years old, his biological mother entrusted guardianship of her son to her own former foster parents Roy and Karen Chasez, who worked as a technology company consultant and an editor, respectively. He was adopted by the couple who lived in Bowie, Maryland, and was raised Mennonite along with their own children, Tyler and Heather. Chasez attended the former Robert Goddard Middle School and Bowie High School. He then got transferred to Dr. Phillips High School after moving to Florida to film The All-New Mickey Mouse Club.

== Career ==
As a child, Chasez was extremely shy, but became interested in dance and got involved in competitive dance troupes. When he was 13, he entered a talent contest on a dare from a friend. He sang "Right Here Waiting" by Richard Marx and won first place. In 1990, his mother saw auditions for the Disney movie Newsies advertised in The Washington Post and encouraged him to try out. At the audition, Chasez was told that he was not the correct age for the character role they were casting for that day and was turned down. He was then told that there were auditions for Disney Channel's revival of The Mickey Mouse Club next door. After successfully auditioning for The All-New Mickey Mouse Club, Chasez was cast as a Mouseketeer in the fourth season and subsequently moved to Orlando to film the show. He went by his initials because there was already another cast member named Josh. Chasez was on the show from 1991 to 1995, seasons 4 through 7. During his time on the show, he befriended future bandmate Justin Timberlake and performed alongside Christina Aguilera, Britney Spears, Keri Russell, Ryan Gosling, Rhona Bennett, and Tony Lucca. In 1995, it was announced that the show would not return for a new season.

After The All-New Mickey Mouse Club, Chasez attempted to pursue a solo music career in Los Angeles, but decided to return home to Maryland after he was left feeling cheated. On his drive back he stopped at Justin Timberlake's house in Memphis, Tennessee, where they wrote demos together. Chasez and Timberlake eventually went to Nashville to continue writing songs and demo tracks with Robin Wiley, who had been a songwriter and vocal coach on The-All New Mickey Mouse Club.

Timberlake then got a phone call from Chris Kirkpatrick, who was asking him to join what would become the boy band NSYNC. Timberlake decided to join the group and recommended Chasez as well. Chasez was still back home in Maryland saving up to return to Nashville. Together the three of them then decided to go to Orlando to look for a baritone. There they ran into Joey Fatone, who already knew Kirkpatrick from their time working together at Universal Studios Florida and was already acquainted with Chasez and Timberlake through friends from their time on The All-New Mickey Mouse Club. After several auditions, the group recruited Jason Galasso as their bass singer. Timberlake's mother created the name NSYNC after she took the last letter of each of the initial members' names: JustiN, ChriS, JoeY, JasoN, and JC and commented on how "in sync" the group's singing voices were. After Galasso decided to permanently leave the group, he was soon replaced by Lance Bass.

=== 1995–2002: NSYNC ===
Chasez and Timberlake served as the two lead singers of the boy band NSYNC. The group was formed in 1995 by Chris Kirkpatrick, and they began recording and performing the following year in Europe. In 1998, the band released its debut album *NSYNC which sold 11 million copies, earning them popularity in the United States with four number one singles including "Tearin' Up My Heart" and "(God Must Have Spent) A Little More Time on You". After the band had a series of legal struggles with manager Lou Pearlman, they signed with Jive Records. They released their third studio album No Strings Attached in 2000, which became the fastest-selling album of all time, selling 2.4 million copies in the first week. They held this record until 2015 when Adele surpassed the single-week sales record with her third album 25. Singles from the No Strings Attached album include "Bye Bye Bye", "This I Promise You", and the number one hit "It's Gonna Be Me". The band produced their fourth studio album, Celebrity in 2001, which sold 1.8 million copies in the first week. NSYNC performed at the Academy Awards in 2000, the 2002 Winter Olympics, and the Super Bowl XXXV halftime show. The group sold more than 70 million records globally, making them the fifth-best selling boy band in history.

After their Celebrity Tour in 2002, NSYNC went on an indefinite hiatus but never formally disbanded.

=== 2002–2007: Solo years ===
Chasez signing an autograph

While still a member of NSYNC, Chasez appeared on the remix and album versions of the 1999 single "Bring It All to Me" by the girl group Blaque, though his vocals were credited to NSYNC as a whole. During the band's time Chasez became involved with songwriting and production for his group and other artists, including Wild Orchid.

During NSYNC's hiatus, Chasez continued to work as a songwriter and producer. Producer Dallas Austin asked Chasez to record the song "Blowin' Me Up (With Her Love)" for the Drumline soundtrack, which was later released as a single. Chasez subsequently began work on a solo album with Jive Records, with tracks written and produced by Austin, Basement Jaxx, Robb Boldt and Riprock 'n' Alex G as well as Chasez. After numerous delays, his debut album Schizophrenic was released in February 2004. Promotion for the album was affected by former bandmate Justin Timberlake and Janet Jackson's Super Bowl XXXVIII halftime show controversy, after which Chasez was dropped from performing at half-time at the 2004 Pro Bowl. With the NFL unhappy with the lyrics of the single "Some Girls (Dance with Women)" expressing too much sexuality, Chasez agreed to alter his performance but was met with too much resistance from the organizers, who ultimately replaced Chasez's act with Hawaiian hula dancers.

At the same time, Chasez sang vocals on the Basement Jaxx track, "Plug It In", which reached number one in the UK Dance Charts. Following the release of Schizophrenic, Chasez began work on his second album, The Story of Kate. The album featured production from Chasez's former NSYNC bandmate Timberlake, Timbaland, Dallas Austin, Jimmy Harry, and Emanuel Kiriakou. Timberlake, who produced a few songs for the album, said, "In my opinion, (JC) had the best voice out of all of us...Out of all the boy bands, call 'em what you will, he was the one that could out-sing all of us. And I've known him since I was twelve, so it was fun to sit behind the board and push him."

Though slated for release in 2006, The Story of Kate was delayed to the following year. Chasez performed material from the new album during guests spots on TV shows Ghost Whisperer, Las Vegas, and Pussycat Dolls Present: Girlicious. After the album's release was further stalled, it was effectively cancelled when Chasez and Jive parted ways through mutual decision in September 2007.

=== 2008–2023: America's Best Dance Crew, songwriting, appearances with NSYNC ===
Though the Story of Kate was never released, Chasez continues to work as a songwriter and producer, with songs written for David Archuleta, Matthew Morrison and Backstreet Boys. He has written for Taemin, Liz, and NU'EST. The song "IF U C Kate" written by Dallas Austin, Taio Cruz, Alan Nglish, and Chasez was featured on the British band McFly's 2010 album, Above the Noise. Chasez wrote and produced two songs on AJ McLean's debut album Have It All, released in the US in February 2011. In February 2012, Chasez and producer Jimmy Harry held auditions for an all-girl group which was formed in November the same year under the name Girl Radical. Girl Radical was an eleven-member pop musical act inspired by large Asian pop supergroups.

In 2008 he became a judge on MTV's America's Best Dance Crew, a competition show for dance crews created by Randy Jackson; Chasez served on the panel for the first seven seasons of the show's original run.

At the 2013 MTV Video Music Awards, Chasez reunited with NSYNC for their first time performance since the group's dissolution to mark Timberlake winning the Video Vanguard Award. In 2014, Chasez was selected to join the North American tour of Andrew Lloyd Webber's rock opera Jesus Christ Superstar as Pontius Pilate. Other cast members included Superstar winner Ben Forster and other well-known artists, including Incubus' Brandon Boyd, Destiny's Child's Michelle Williams, and Public Image Ltd's John Lydon. However, on May 30, 2014, the entire North American tour was abruptly canceled, with poor projected ticket sales cited as the reason.

Along with Miguel and Aloe Blacc, Chasez was featured on a new version of "My Girl" with Smokey Robinson on the album Smokey & Friends. In 2015, Chasez appeared, along with 3OH!3, on the title track of the Blues Traveler album Blow Up the Moon, and on the song's accompanying music video. In 2016, Chasez starred in the film Opening Night, in which he played a dramatized version of himself.

In April 2019, Chasez and bandmates Lance Bass, Joey Fatone, and Chris Kirkpatrick performed with Ariana Grande as part of headlining set at Coachella.

=== 2023–present: NSYNC Reunion, Playing with Fire ===
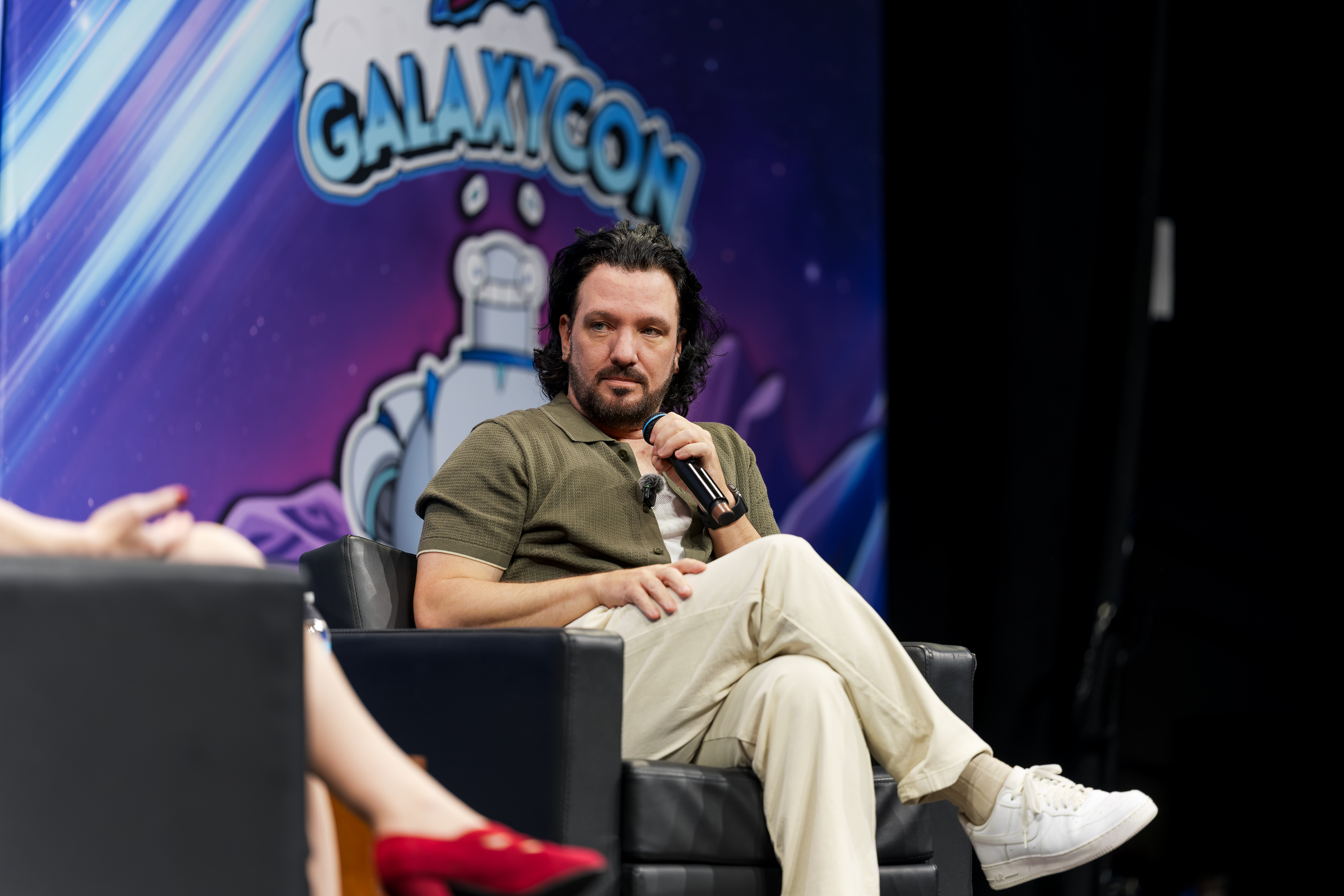
Chasez at GalaxyCon Raleigh in 2026

On September 12, 2023, after some speculation regarding a potential reunion, Chasez and the other four members of NSYNC appeared together at the 2023 MTV Video Music Awards to present the award for Best Pop to Taylor Swift. On September 14, it was confirmed the group recorded a new song titled "Better Place" for the DreamWorks Animation film Trolls Band Together. The song, which was released on September 29, 2023, was the group's first new song in 22 years.

On March 13, 2024, NSYNC reunited and performed live at Justin Timberlake's "One Night Only" show at The Wiltern in Los Angeles. They debuted their new song "Paradise" and performed and previous hits, "Bye Bye Bye" and "It's Gonna Be Me". The performance was the first time all five NSYNC members had performed together since the 2013 MTV Video Music Awards. "Paradise" is one of the tracks from Timberlake's album Everything I Thought It Was.

In January 2023, Chasez appeared as a guest on former bandmate Lance Bass' Frosted Tips podcast, and revealed he was working on a musical. In October the following year, Chasez released Playing with Fire, a musical concept album that he produced with Jimmy Harry. Inspired by Mary Shelley's Frankenstein, the work features Chasez's vocals alongside singers Cardamon Rozzi and Lily Elise.

== Filmography ==
Films
Year	Title	Role	Notes
2000	Longshot	Pizzeria Worker	Along with NSYNC, credited as Joshua Chasez in credits
2008	Killer Movie	Ted Buckley	
2009	21 and a Wake-Up	Dr. Tom Drury	
2014	Red Sky	Alex Cruise	
2017	Opening Night	Himself	
2019	The Boy Band Con: The Lou Pearlman Story	Himself	Documentary film on YouTube
2020	Famous Adjacent	Himself	
2023	Trolls Band Together	Hype	Voice

Television
Year	Title	Role	Notes
1991–1996	The All New Mickey Mouse Club	Himself	Seasons 4–7
2000	Saturday Night Live	Himself / Musical Guest	Along with NSYNC
2000	Live with Regis	Himself / co-host	Along with NSYNC
2000	Billboard Music Awards	Himself / co-host	Along with NSYNC
2001	The Simpsons	Himself	"New Kids on the Blecch" (Season 12, episode 14)
2002	Summer Music Mania	Himself / co-host	Also hosted by Chris Kirkpatrick and Jennifer Love Hewitt
2002	What I Like About You	Himself	"Spa Day" (Season 1, episode 2)
2003	Greetings from Tucson	Jay Dugray	"Home Sweet Home" (Season 1, episode 18)
2004	All That	Himself	"JC Chasez/Drake Bell" (Season 9, episode 7)
2005	What's New, Scooby-Doo?	Himself	"A Scooby-Doo Valentine" (Season 3, episode 3)
2006	Ghost Whisperer	Samson	"The Curse of the Ninth" (Season 2, episode 9)
2007	Britain's Next Top Model	Himself	Week 2 (Cycle 3)
2008	Pussycat Dolls Present: Girlicious	Himself	"Confidence" (Season 1, episode 2)
2008	Las Vegas	William	"I Could Eat a Horse" (Season 5, episode 12)
2008–2012	America's Best Dance Crew	Himself / Judge	Seasons 1–7

== Award nominations ==
Year	Award	Category	Work	Result	Ref.
1993	Young Artist Awards	Outstanding Young Ensemble Cast in a Youth Series or Variety Show	The All New Mickey Mouse Club	Nominated	
2000	Grammy Awards	Best Pop Collaboration with Vocals	"Music of My Heart"	Nominated	
2000	Grammy Awards	Best Country Collaboration with Vocals	"God Must Have Spent a Little More Time on You"	Nominated	
2001	Grammy Awards	Record of the Year	"Bye Bye Bye"	Nominated	
2001	Grammy Awards	Best Pop Performance by a Duo or Group with Vocals	"Bye Bye Bye"	Nominated	
2001	Grammy Awards	Best Pop Vocal Album	No Strings Attached	Nominated	
2002	Grammy Awards	Best Pop Performance by a Duo or Group with Vocals	"Gone"	Nominated	
2002	Grammy Awards	Best Pop Vocal Album	"Celebrity"	Nominated	
2003	Grammy Awards	Best Pop Performance by a Duo or Group with Vocals	"Girlfriend"	Nominated	
2003	Teen Choice Awards	Choice Music – Male Artist		Nominated	
2003	MTV Video Music Awards	Best Video from a Film	"Blowin' Me Up (With Her Love)"	Nominated	
2005	Groovevolt Music and Fashion Awards	Best Deep Cut	"Dear Goodbye"	Nominated	
2025	Grammy Awards	Best Song Written for Visual Media	"Better Place"	Nominated	

== Discography ==
=== Studio albums ===
- Schizophrenic (2004)
- Playing with Fire (2024)

=== With NSYNC ===
- NSYNC (1997)
- Home for Christmas (1998)
- No Strings Attached (2000)
- Celebrity (2001)
