= Lance Bass =

American singer and actor (born 1979)

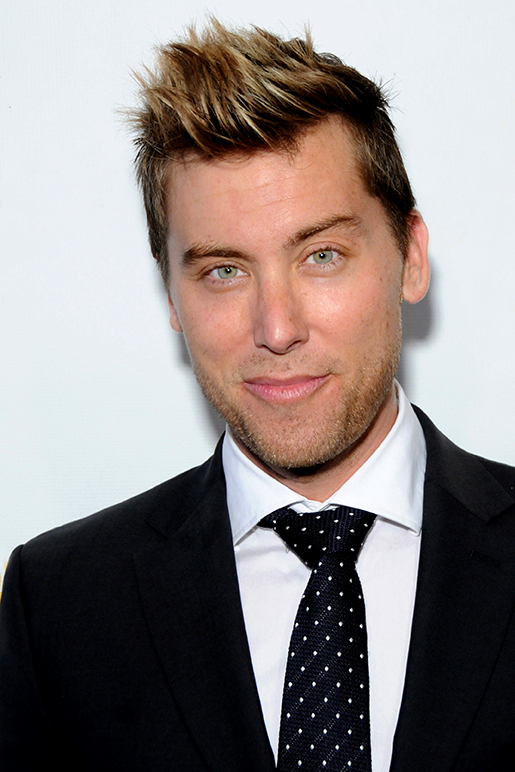
- Bass in 2014
- Born: James Lance Bass; May 4, 1979 (age 47); Laurel, Mississippi, U.S.
- Other name: Lansten
- Occupations: Singer; actor; dancer; producer
- Years active: 1995–present
- Spouse: Michael Turchin (m. 2014)
- Children: 2
- Musical career
- Genre: Pop
- Instruments: Vocals; piano; keyboards
- Formerly of: NSYNC
- Website: LanceBass.com

James Lance Bass (/bæs/; born May 4, 1979) is an American singer, actor, and producer. He grew up in Mississippi and rose to fame as the bass singer for the boy band NSYNC. The band has sold over 70 million records, becoming one of the best-selling boy bands of all time. NSYNC's success led Bass to work in film and television.

He starred in the 2001 film On the Line, which his company, Bacon & Eggs, also produced. Bass later formed a second production company, Lance Bass Productions, as well as a now-defunct music management company, Free Lance Entertainment, a joint venture with Mercury Records.

After NSYNC's PopOdyssey Tour ended in September 2001, Bass moved to Star City, Russia, in a much publicized pursuit of a space tourism seat on a Soyuz space capsule. Bass was certified by both NASA and the Russian Space Program after several months of cosmonaut training and planned to join the TMA-1 mission to the International Space Station. However, after his financial sponsors backed out, Bass was denied a seat on the mission.

In July 2006, Bass came out as gay in a cover story for People magazine. He was awarded the Human Rights Campaign Visibility Award in October 2006 and released an autobiography, Out of Sync, in October 2007, which debuted on the New York Times Best Seller list.

== Early life and education ==
James Lance Bass was born in Laurel, Mississippi, to James Irvin Bass Jr., a medical technologist, and Diane (née Pulliam), a middle school mathematics, English, and career discovery teacher. Along with his older sister, Stacy, Bass grew up in adjacent Ellisville, Mississippi, and was raised as a Southern Baptist. Bass has described his family as devoutly Christian and conservative, and has said that his childhood was "extremely happy".

As a young boy, Bass developed an interest in space, and at age 9 traveled to Cape Canaveral, Florida, with his father to watch his first live Space Shuttle launch. Of this experience, Bass said, "I was certain from then on that my future was to be involved with space." Shortly after, Bass attended space camp in Titusville, Florida, and aspired to attend college and study engineering, with the hope that he would one day work for NASA.

When Bass was 11 years old, his father was transferred to a different hospital, and the family moved to Clinton, Mississippi. Bass began singing in his Baptist church choir and was encouraged to audition for local performance groups by his childhood best friend, Darren Dale, the youngest child of former longtime Mississippi Insurance Commissioner George Dale. Bass joined the Mississippi Show Stoppers, a statewide music group sponsored by the Mississippi Agriculture and Forestry Museum, and the Attaché Show Choir, a national-award-winning competitive show choir group at Clinton High School. He was also a member of a seven-man vocal group named Seven Card Stud, which competed at state fairs and performed at several social and political events for Senator Trent Lott.

At Clinton High School, Bass was elected vice president of his junior class and has said that he performed well in math and science. However, Bass later said that his primary focus during high school was singing, and when reflecting on it, he remembers "hardly anything" about academia.

== Career ==
=== Music ===
==== NSYNC ====
In 1995, during his junior year of high school, Bass received a call from Justin Timberlake and his mother, Lynn Harless, who asked Bass if he would be interested in auditioning for the pop group NSYNC after the group's original bass singer, Jason Galasso, had quit. Timberlake's vocal coach (who had worked with Bass during his time as a Mississippi Show Stopper) recommended Bass as a replacement. Bass was accepted into the group after auditioning in front of the other bandmembers, and soon left school to move to Orlando, Florida and rehearse full-time. Bass has said that he did not know how to dance before he joined NSYNC, and therefore found much of the group's choreography difficult to learn.

According to an episode of VH1's Driven, Jan Bolz, president of BMG's German division, offered NSYNC a recording contract under the condition that they replace Bass, whose dancing, he felt, "wasn't at the same level as all the others." However, Chris Kirkpatrick (who formed the band) refused to accept the contract without Bass. The group's manager, Johnny Wright, convinced Bolz that Bass's dancing would quickly improve. Bolz conceded, and the group soon moved to Munich, Germany to record their first album with BMG. NSYNC began extensive touring in Europe, and Bass's mother quit her job to tour with the group as a chaperone, as Bass was still a minor.

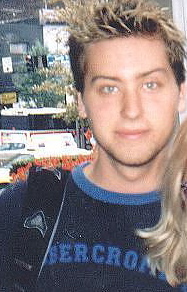
Bass in 2001

After gaining significant notability in Europe, NSYNC was signed to the American record label RCA in 1997. The group's first single, "I Want You Back" began receiving major radio play in the United States, and NSYNC soon found themselves becoming an "overnight sensation", a period which Bass describes in his autobiography as "the death of my own innocence". Along with increasing fame and recognition in the United States, the band also experienced a highly publicized legal battle with Lou Pearlman, who originally put the band together, due to what the group believed were illicit business practices on his part.

NSYNC sued Pearlman and his record company, Trans Continental, for defrauding the group of more than 50% of their earnings, rather than his original promise of receiving only one-sixth of the profits. The group threatened to leave and sign with Jive Records, which prompted Pearlman and RCA to countersue NSYNC for $150 million US, citing breach of contract. The injunction was thrown out of court and, after winning back their earnings, NSYNC signed with Jive.

In March 2000, NSYNC released No Strings Attached, which became the fastest-selling record of all time, selling 1.1 million copies in its first day of release. In 2001, the group followed up with their Celebrity album, which scored the second highest first-week album sales ever, trumped only by the group's previous album. NSYNC went on to sell over 56 million records worldwide. In 2002, the group announced that they would be taking a "hiatus", during which Timberlake began to record solo material. NSYNC has not recorded new material since, and Bass has stated that he feels the group has officially disbanded.

In 2007, Bass said he had faith Timberlake would return after six months off to record another album with NSYNC, and that he felt betrayed by Timberlake's 2004 decision to pursue his solo career instead. Bass has also said he has little hope for a reunion since Timberlake has "made it clear that he wouldn't be interested in discussing another album any time soon." Despite these statements, Bass has denied that he harbors any ill feelings towards Timberlake, saying: "At that time ... it did feel like betrayal. I felt heartbroken. All these emotions went through me. Today, I'm really happy, and Justin and I are really great friends. I don't hate him at all. And I understand what he was going through, and it was as hard for him as it was for any of us."

In September 2023, a new NSYNC song, "Better Place" was announced following a reunion of the band at the MTV Video Music Awards. The song, part of the soundtrack to the film Trolls Band Together, was released September 29.

==== Free Lance Entertainment ====
In 2000, Bass formed a music management company named Free Lance Entertainment, which was a joint venture with Mercury Nashville, a division of Mercury Records. Vowing to keep the company "a strictly family-run operation", Bass employed his parents and sister as talent scouts, and he recruited childhood friend and aspiring country singer Meredith Edwards for the company's first release. Edwards began touring with NSYNC as an opening act in the fall of 2000, and Bass teamed up with MTV to hold a nationwide talent search for more artists later that year. However, Free Lance soon folded after disappointing sales of Edwards's debut album, Reach.

=== Acting ===
==== Film and television ====
Bass guest-starred on The WB drama series 7th Heaven, playing Rick Palmer, a love interest for Beverley Mitchell's character, Lucy. The following year, while NSYNC was in the midst of recording Celebrity, Bass received his first starring role in the 2001 motion picture On the Line. Bass played Kevin, a man who falls in love with a woman on a Chicago train and begins a search to find her again.

The film was produced by Bass's production company, A Happy Place (later renamed Bacon & Eggs), and it featured appearances by Jerry Stiller, Al Green, Bon Jovi guitarist Richie Sambora, former WWE wrestler Chyna, and Bass's bandmates Timberlake, Kirkpatrick and Fatone, the latter in a major role. The film also featured a soundtrack which included previously unreleased songs by NSYNC and Britney Spears. Bass collaborated with Joey Fatone, Mandy Moore, Christian Burns and True Vibe (as the "On the Line Allstars") for the film's theme song, "On the Line".

Despite heavy marketing towards NSYNC teen fans, the film was a commercial failure, grossing only US$4.2 million domestically despite its $10-million budget. The film, along with Bass's acting, was poorly received by critics. Bass later said he felt the film's success was greatly hindered by its release date, which came one week after the World Trade Center attacks of September 11, 2001. In his 2007 autobiography, Bass wrote, "That was it – our film was finished ... once the country went to war, there was no way our film was going to be on anyone's top-priority list."

After On the Line, Bass appeared in Zoolander and Wes Craven's Cursed as himself, and he played a wedding singer in I Now Pronounce You Chuck & Larry. Bass has also lent his voice to several animated television programs, such as Robot Chicken and Disney's Kim Possible, Handy Manny and Higglytown Heroes. Bass made an appearance in the 2008 film Tropic Thunder. As a guest star in the 2013 Gravity Falls episode "Boyz Crazy", Bass plays in the boy band, Sev'ral Timez (which is a parody of NSYNC). In 2014, Bass guest starred on an episode of the Comedy Central series Review, in which he visited space along with the show's lead character.

==== Video games ====
Bass voiced the Final Fantasy VII character Sephiroth in Kingdom Hearts.

==== Broadway ====
On August 14, 2007, Bass began a six-month stint playing Corny Collins in the Broadway musical Hairspray, coinciding with the play's five-year stage anniversary. He ended his run in Hairspray on January 6, 2008.

==== Media personality/game shows, reality shows, and talk shows ====
In 2015, Bass joined season two of The Meredith Vieira Show as a full-time contributing panelist.

Bass and his mother competed in 2017 with other duos in the FOX reality cooking series My Kitchen Rules, and were the runners-up.

In 2020, Lance appeared with friend Joey Fatone on Meredith Vieira's syndicated program, 25 Words or Less (season 1, episodes 121–123).

In April 2021, Bass became a panelist for the new TV series Unicorn Hunters, a business investment show where he and other judges determine whether or not to invest in start-ups and other companies with high valuation potential.

=== Radio ===
Bass hosted Dirty Pop with Lance Bass, a daily evening drive time radio show focusing on pop culture and entertainment news on OutQ, an LGBTQ-geared station on SiriusXM. Bass was also the host of the weekly "Pop2Kountdown" on Pop2K, which counts down the 30 biggest hits from that week from a different year in the 2000s.

=== Podcast ===
On January 3, 2023, Bass released the trailer for his podcast, Frosted Tips with Lance Bass. The first episode aired on January 9, 2023, in which he interviewed former bandmate JC Chasez of NSYNC.

In February, he began releasing episodes for another podcast, The Last Soviet, describing the story of Sergei Krikalev's time on the Mir space station during the collapse of the Soviet Union as well as Bass's own experience training at Star City.

=== Dancing with the Stars ===
Bass was a contestant on season 7 of Dancing with the Stars and was paired with swing dance champ Lacey Schwimmer. Bass and Schwimmer reached the grand finale in competition and finished in third place.

Week #	Dance/Song	Judges' score			Result
Week #	Dance/Song	Inaba	Goodman	Tonioli	Result
1, Night 1	Cha-Cha-Cha/"Jumpin' Jack Flash"	8	6	8	Safe
1, Night 2	Quickstep/"Close to Me"	7	6	8	Safe
2	Paso Doble/"I Kissed a Girl"	7	6	7	Safe
3	Viennese Waltz/"Let Me Leave"	8	7	7	Last to be Called Safe
4	Tango/"Disturbia"	9	8	9	Safe
5	West Coast Swing/"Breakin' Dishes"	7	7	7	Safe
6	Jive/"Tutti Frutti"; Old School Hip Hop/"It Takes Two	9 No	9* Scores	9 Given	Safe
7	Rumba/"Your Body Is A Wonderland"; Team Cha-Cha-Cha/"Mercy"	9; 6	7; 7	9; 7	Safe
8	Foxtrot/"Sweet Pea"; Samba/"1 Thing"	9; 8	8; 7	9; 9	Safe
9 Semi-finals	Mambo/"Straight to Number One'"; Jitterbug/"Jim Dandy"	10; 10	9; 9	9; 10	Safe
10; Finals	Samba/"Blame It on the Boogie"; Freestyle/"It's Tricky"; Jitterbug/"Jim Dandy"	9; 9; 9	8; 9; 9	9; 9; 10	Third place

== Production company ==
In January 2001, Bass formed his first film production company, A Happy Place, with film producers Rich Hull, Wendy Thorlakson and Joe Anderson. The company was geared towards family-friendly films, and received the Movieguide award for "Excellence in Family-Oriented Programming" for its first feature film, On the Line. After On the Line, A Happy Place changed its name to Bacon & Eggs and produced its second feature film, Lovewrecked, in 2005. The film debuted on ABC Family in January 2007, starring Amanda Bynes, Chris Carmack, and Jamie-Lynn Sigler, with Bass in a minor role. This too received mostly negative reviews.

Bass later formed a separate production company named Lance Bass Productions. On May 14, 2007, Brian Graden announced that Lance Bass Productions would be working with the Logo network in executive producing a reality television show about the music business. It was reported that the show will focus on the creation and development of an all-gay boy band. To date no such project has been developed or aired.

In 2008, Bass co-produced The Grand, and Bass' company is reported to be developing a music docudrama about the life of rock bands on tour.

In October 2011, Bass debuted his own boy band called Heart2Heart. In August 2013, Bass became an executive producer of the documentary film Kidnapped for Christ along with Mike C. Manning. The film sheds light on controversial behavior modification methods used on children, sent there by their parents, at an Evangelical Christian reform school in the Dominican Republic. The film was sold to Showtime, to be released on television July 10, 2014.

== Personal life ==
Bass dated actress Danielle Fishel of TV's Boy Meets World throughout 1999 and 2000. Fishel said she was heavily invested in the relationship, commenting that she was "so in love" with Bass. Bass ended the relationship after one year and continued to exclusively date women until he was 22.

In his autobiography, Bass documents two gay relationships that predated media speculation; one with someone from Miami, Florida, named Jesse, with whom Bass lived for two years, and another with an Idaho native named Joe. Bass began dating Amazing Race winner Reichen Lehmkuhl in early 2006, a courtship that garnered tabloid coverage and led to Bass's decision to come out. Bass described his relationship with Lehmkuhl as "very stable"; however, the couple split up several months later. Shortly after his split with Lehmkuhl, Bass briefly dated Brazilian model and LXTV host Pedro Andrade. From August 2007 to March 2008, Bass dated New York-based hairdresser Ben Thigpen. After a year and a half of dating, Bass became engaged to Michael Turchin in September 2013. Bass and Turchin married on December 20, 2014, in Los Angeles.

In a 2006 interview, Bass said he has Attention-Deficit Disorder. In August 2024, he made it known that he has type 1.5 diabetes, which had been misdiagnosed a few years earlier as type 2. Bass's favorite music bands are Aerosmith, the Goo Goo Dolls, and Journey, and his favorite actress is Lucille Ball, whom he grew up watching on I Love Lucy re-runs. He is a self-described "huge Dr. Seuss fan", devoting an entire room in his Jackson, Mississippi, estate to Seuss memorabilia. Bass has said he is a Christian and that he regularly attends church, though he considers himself to be non-denominational. He is the godfather of former bandmate and best friend Joey Fatone's daughters, Briahna and Kloey.

At age 38, Bass was diagnosed with psoriatic arthritis, an inflammatory immune disease, and took part in an ad campaign by Amgen to raise awareness about the disease.

=== Sexual orientation ===
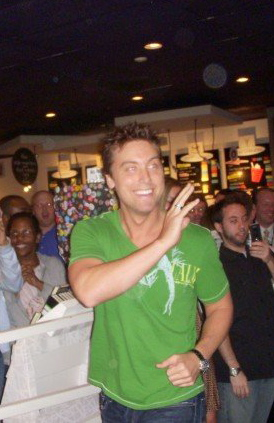
Bass in Atlanta, Georgia, October 2007

Bass came out as gay in a cover story for People magazine on July 26, 2006. There had been considerable media speculation about his orientation due to numerous paparazzi snapshots of him at gay bars and nightclubs, most notably during the preceding Independence Day weekend in Provincetown, Massachusetts. Celebrity gossip blogger Perez Hilton had also been posting items on his website about Bass's orientation since September 2005, and New York gossip column Page Six ran a blurb on July 12, 2006, that reported a sighting of Bass at a gay bar with his then-boyfriend, Lehmkuhl. Bass's publicist, Ken Sunshine, chose to release the story exclusively to People magazine, who bumped actor Johnny Depp off that week's cover in favor of Bass. In his coming out interview, Bass stated,

The thing is, I'm not ashamed – that's the one thing I want to say. I don't think it's wrong, I'm not devastated going through this. I'm more liberated and happy than I've been my whole life. I'm just happy.

Bass's announcement received a large amount of media attention. The American public's reaction was generally positive, with Bass receiving "overwhelming support" from many teenagers and young adults who grew up listening to 'N Sync. However, Bass received criticism from the LGBT community when he referred to himself and his friends as "straight-acting" in his People interview, stating, "I call them the SAGs – the straight-acting gays. We're just normal, typical guys. I love to watch football and drink beer." This comment angered some members of the LGBTQ community, who believed that Bass not only implied that effeminate gay men were not 'normal', but further enforced unneeded stereotypes. In a 2007 interview with The Advocate, Bass called his comment a "mistake" and noted that he was unaware of the negative implications surrounding the term. Bass stated, "Every community is hard to please. Our community is very fickle. It's a touchy community because it's the last civil rights movement we have left here in America. So when someone new like myself comes along and says off-the-mark things, yeah, I can see how people would get pissed."

Bass found himself in the midst of further controversy later that year when he, along with then-boyfriend Reichen Lehmkuhl, was awarded 2006 Human Rights Campaign Visibility Award on October 7, 2006. The Washington Blade printed a guest editorial from a longtime HRC supporter who claimed that neither recipient had done enough to deserve the award and that The Human Rights Campaign was simply capitalizing on Bass's fame to sell tickets. The Human Rights Campaign stood by Bass and defended his award, responding to critics by saying, "Bass is the biggest music star since Melissa Etheridge to come out, and maybe some people think HRC should just ignore these moments of cultural significance, but his declaration did initiate a positive, national conversation that continues today."

=== Marriage and family ===
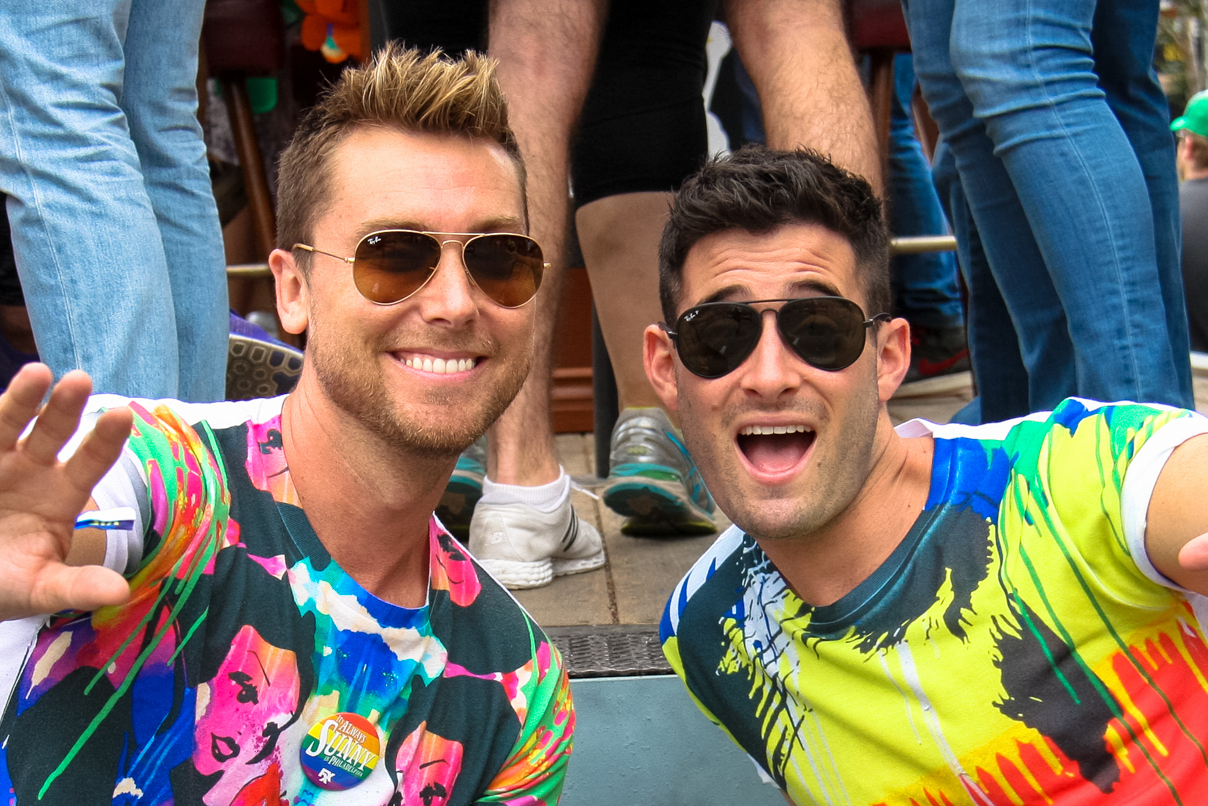
Bass and husband Michael Turchin in 2016

Bass began dating painter and actor Michael Turchin in January 2011 and they became engaged in September 2013. They married on December 20, 2014, at the Park Plaza Hotel in Los Angeles. His former NSYNC bandmates (with the exception of Justin Timberlake, who was then headlining his The 20/20 Experience World Tour) were in attendance. The ceremonial event was filmed and televised in a special E! presentation: Lance Loves Michael: The Lance Bass Wedding that aired on February 5, 2015. Bass and Turchin were the first same-sex couple to exchange vows on cable television. After four years of marriage, the couple decided to extend their family and have a child with the help of a surrogate. In March 2020, Bass announced the couple had lost a baby via the surrogate having a miscarriage at eight weeks. It had been the couple's ninth surrogacy attempt. In June 2021, Bass announced they were expecting twins by early November. Their son and daughter were born in mid-October.

=== Space tourism plans ===
In early 2002, Lena Banks, a space advocate and founder/producer of Think Tank Ink Productions, was developing her Youngest Person in Space project. At one point they had planned for a U.S. version of a space competition show, The Big Mission, that had been successful in Denmark; contestants would go through rigorous training and vie for a seat on a Russian Soyuz space capsule. The project later pivoted to a documentary of a celebrity training and going into space, intended to air on a major network.

When Banks mentioned the space project to a friend, the friend's daughter shouted out, "Lance Bass wants to go into space!" The girl, who was an NSYNC fan, had learned of Bass' lifelong dream of space travel from a promotional online chat. Banks spoke to Bass' management who went to him with the proposal. "At first he thought we were joking," Banks remarked. "I assured him it was for real; he accepted and we moved forward with the project." In August 2002, Bass entered cosmonaut training in Star City, Russia.

To be admitted into training, Bass had to go through strenuous physicals. He had recently discovered a cardiac arrhythmia after a hospital visit while on tour in 1999 for what he thought was a stomach virus. While the condition had been assessed as benign, it was disqualifying for the cosmonaut program, so he agreed to undergo heart surgery to correct it

The Russian space program had agreed to provide an abbreviated four-month training program, but at several points his training was interrupted due to ongoing funding issues, and he finally received cosmonaut certification only after paying the remaining $450,000 himself. He then went on to Houston's Johnson Space Center (JSC) for further training in the astronaut program.

Bass was scheduled to fly into space on the Soyuz TMA-1 mission that would launch on October 30, 2002. The capsule was to fly to the International Space Station and land in a desert in Kazakhstan. However, the original deal to air the documentary about Bass, which was to be a major funding source, fell through in mid-2002. Bass's camp turned instead to MTV, who initially agreed to sponsor the trip but then backed out over financial terms Shortly after, all of Bass's other sponsorships fell through, including one sponsor who pulled out because they worried about their brand being tarnished if Bass were to die on the mission. Bass was eventually rejected from the program, and was replaced on the flight by Russian cosmonauts Yury Lonchakov and Sergei Zalyotin and Belgium's Frank De Winne.

==== Space advocacy ====
In 2003, Bass began serving as World Space Week's Youth Spokesman. Bass has said that he believes young people becoming more interested in space exploration "will help the future of our planet". From 2003 to 2005, Bass spent World Space Week traveling to American high schools speaking with students about space exploration and encouraging them to explore careers in science and mathematics. Bass is a member of the National Space Society, a non-profit educational space advocacy organization founded by Wernher von Braun. Bass has served on the National Space Society's board of governors since October 2004, alongside other space advocates such as actor Tom Hanks and author and futurist Sir Arthur C. Clarke. In a 2007 interview with GQ magazine, Bass said he "absolutely" still intends on going to space, and that he hopes to work on a space documentary. Bass has also retained fluency in Russian, which he was required to learn during his training.

=== Autobiography ===
Following public response surrounding his coming out, Bass announced that he was releasing an autobiography. The book, titled Out of Sync, was published on October 23, 2007. It was co-written by The New York Times best-selling biographer Marc Eliot, who also wrote the book's introduction, and was published by Simon Spotlight Entertainment, a division of Simon & Schuster. The 208-page book covers what Bass describes as "the first chapter" in his life, from his childhood growing up in rural Mississippi, to his efforts to obtain a seat on a Russian space capsule and the proceeding financial issues he had with his sponsors, and culminating with Bass's decision to go public with his sexuality. The book includes details about boyfriends that he kept from family and friends. He recounts NSYNC's 2002 decision to go on an "extended hiatus". Bass said Justin Timberlake was the sole reason NSYNC did not get back together. Out of Sync debuted on the New York Times Best Seller list for the week of November 11, 2007.

=== Philanthropy and causes ===
Bass has been involved with a number of charities. In 2001, he founded The Lance Bass Foundation, a non-profit organization that was designed to meet the health needs of low-income children. In 2003, Bass donated $30,000 US to establish the Amber Pulliam Special Education Endowment at the University of Southern Mississippi. Named for his younger cousin, Amber Pulliam, who has Down syndrome, it serves financial aid students from Mississippi's Pine Belt who plan a career in special education.

After 2005's Hurricane Katrina, Bass launched "uBid For Hurricane Relief", a celebrity auction to benefit victims of the hurricane, with uBid.com. Proceeds from the auction were split between the Child Welfare League of America, The Brett Favre Fourward Foundation, and Ashton Kutcher's RockWorks Foundation. Many of Bass's family members in Mississippi were directly affected by the hurricane. That same year, Bass appeared on an episode of Extreme Makeover: Home Edition with a donation to a Russian woman to save a camp for disabled children in Russia.

Bass is a member of the Environmental Media Association's board of directors. He has also been involved with Animal Avengers, Shannon Elizabeth's animal rescue organization. He has two dogs which he adopted from a rescue shelter, both of whom he posed with in a PETA ad urging people to adopt rather than buy animals. In August 2007, Bass wrote a guest commentary for LOGO's "Visible Vote '08" blog, in which he expressed support for gay marriage. In September 2007, Bass participated in a series of GLAAD television advertisements promoting tolerance for the LGBTQ community. Bass has also been involved in fundraising for the Gay, Lesbian and Straight Education Network.

== Discography ==
=== As a solo artist ===
- "Walking on Air" (2014, single)
- "Perfect This Way" (2023, single with Station Little)

=== NSYNC ===
- NSYNC (1998)
- No Strings Attached (2000)
- Celebrity (2001)

== Filmography ==
=== Film ===
Year	Title	Role	Notes
2001	Zoolander	Himself	Cameo appearance
2001	On the Line	Kevin Gibbons	
2001	Longshot	Flight Engineer	
2005	Cursed	Himself	Cameo appearance
2005	Love Wrecked	Dan	
2007	I Now Pronounce You Chuck & Larry	Himself	
2008	Tropic Thunder	Himself	Cameo appearance
2012	Mississippi I Am	Himself	Cameo appearance
2014	Such Good People	Stuart Hedron	
2014	White Dwarf	Lance	
2015	Hell and Back	Boy Band Demon (voice)	
2019	The Boy Band Con: The Lou Pearlman Story	Himself	Documentary
2023	Trolls Band Together	Boom (voice)	
2023	Baby Shark's Big Movie!	Himself (voice)	

=== Television ===
Year	Title	Role	Notes
1999	Sabrina the Teenage Witch	Himself	Episode: "Sabrina and the Pirates"
1999	Clueless	Himself	Episode: "None for the Road"
1999	Touched by an Angel	Street Performer	Episode: "Voice of an Angel"
2000	7th Heaven	Rick Palmer	Episode: "Who Do You Trust?"
2000	Saturday Night Live	Himself	Episode: "Joshua Jackson/NSYNC"
2000	Sesame Street	Himself	Episode: "Elmo in Numberland"
2001	The Simpsons	Himself (voice)	Episode: "New Kids on the Blecch"
2001	Mad TV	Himself	Episode: "7.4"
2004	Kim Possible	Robby (voice)	Episode: "Oh Boyz"
2004	Higglytown Heroes	Electrician Hero (voice)	2 episodes
2005	Robot Chicken	Himself/Chris Kirkpatrick/Tom Root (voice)	Episode: "S&M Present"
2005–2008	Kathy Griffin: My Life on the D-List	Himself	3 episodes
2006–2012	Handy Manny	Elliot (voice)	8 episodes
2008	Rick and Steve: The Happiest Gay Couple in All the World	Himself (voice)	Episode: "Death of a Lesbian Bed"
2011	Drop Dead Diva	Jamie	Episode: "Prom"
2013	Gravity Falls	Sev'ral Timez (voice)	Episode: "Boyz Crazy"
2014	Review	Himself	Episode: "Best Friend; Space"
2014	Real Husbands of Hollywood	Himself	Episode: "Don't Vote for Nick"
2015	BoJack Horseman	Himself (voice)	Episode: "Out to Sea"
2015	Hand of God	Jerry	Episode: "Your Inside Voice"
2015–2016	The Meredith Vieira Show	Himself	Season 2 panelist
2016	Finding Prince Charming	Host	9 episodes
2016	The Real O'Neals	Himself	Episode: "The Real Thang"
2017	Hollywood Darlings	Himself	Episode: "The Luke Perry Incident"
2017	My Kitchen Rules	Himself	8 episodes
2018	Whose Line is it Anyway?	Himself	Episode: "Lance Bass"
2018	Adam Ruins Everything	Himself	Episode: "Adam Ruins Sleep"
2019	Single Parents	Himself	2 episodes
2019	Insatiable	Brazen Moorehead	Episode: "The Most You Can Be"
2021	The Circle	Himself	Episode: "Bye, Bye, Bye!"
2021	RuPaul's Drag Race	Himself	Episode: "RPDR Reunited"
2021	Bachelor in Paradise	Host	3 episodes
2023	Bossy Bear	Tyler (voice)	5 episodes
2023	The Rookie	Himself	Episode: "Double Trouble"
2023	How I Met Your Father	Himself	Episode: "Out of Sync"
2024	The Tiny Chef Show	Himself	Episode: "Peanut Butter & Jelly"
2024	RuPaul's Drag Race All Stars	Himself	Episode: "Grand Finale Variety Extravaganza: Part 2"
2025	Big Brother: Unlocked	Himself	Season 1 Guest Panelist, Episode: "Big Brother: Unlocked 9/5/25"

=== Video games ===
Year	Title	Voice role	Notes
2002	Kingdom Hearts	Sephiroth	English dub
