= Meredith Edwards =

Meredith Edwards may refer to:

- Meredith Edwards (singer), American singer
- Meredith Edwards (actor), Welsh actor
