= Out of Sync =

Out of Sync may refer to:

- Out-of-Sync, 1995 American film;
- Out of Sync (book), 2007 autobiographical book;
- Out of Sync (film), 2021 Spanish-Lithuanian-French film.
