= Yury Lonchakov =

Russian cosmonaut (born 1965)

- Юрий Лончаков
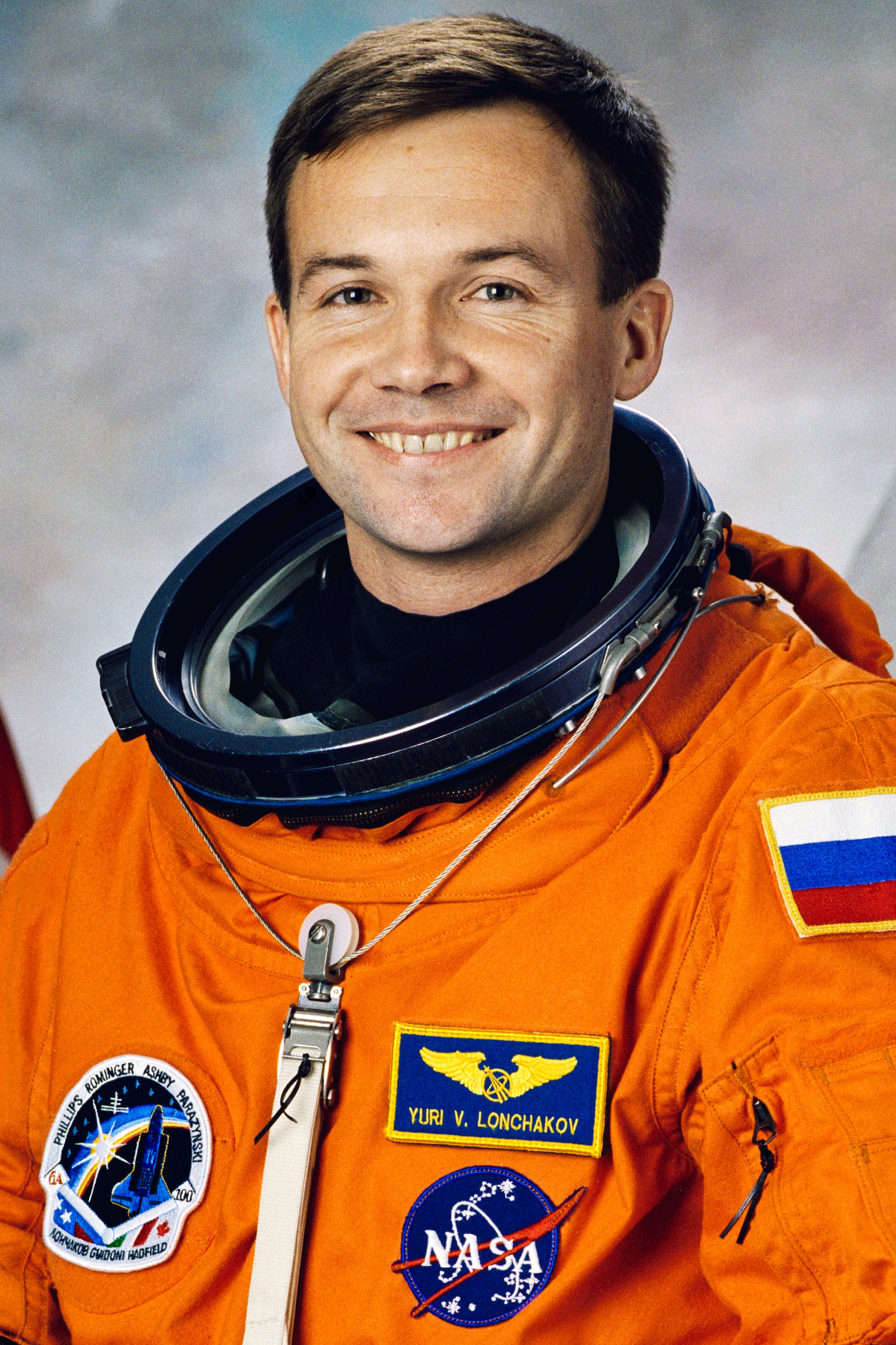
- Lonchakov in 2001
- Born: Yury Valentinovich Lonchakov; 4 March 1965 (age 61); Balqash, Kazakh SSR
- Occupation: Pilot
- Awards: Hero of the Russian Federation
- Space career

Roscosmos cosmonaut
- Status: Resigned
- Rank: Colonel, Russian Air Force
- Time in space: 200d 18h 39m
- Selection: 1997 TsPK Cosmonaut Group
- Total EVAs: 2
- Total EVA time: 10 hours 27 minutes
- Mission: STS-100, Soyuz TMA-1/TM-34, Soyuz TMA-13 (Expedition 18)
- Retired: September 14, 2013

Yury Valentinovich Lonchakov (Russian: Юрий Валентинович Лончаков; born 4 March 1965) is a Russian former cosmonaut and a veteran of three space missions. He has spent 200 days in space and has conducted two spacewalks. From 2014 to 2017, Lonchakov served as head of the Yuri Gagarin Cosmonaut Training Center.

== Personal ==
Lonchakov was born on 4 March 1965, in Balkhash, Dzhezkazkansk Region, Kazakhstan. He considers Aktyubinsk as his native city since he had spent his childhood and youth there. Lonchokov's parents, Lonchakov Valentin Gavrilovich and Galina Vasilyevna were geologists. He is married to Lonchakova (Dolmatova) Tatyana Alexeevna. They have one son, Kirill, born in 1990. His hobbies include books, tourism, auto-tourism, downhill skiing, sport games.

== Education ==
Following graduation from high school in 1982, Lonchakov entered the Orenburg Air Force Pilot School, graduating with honors in 1986 as pilot-engineer. In 1995, Lonchakov entered the Zhukovski Air Force Academy from which he graduated with honors in 1998 as pilot-engineer-researcher.

== Awards and ranks ==
Lonchakov was awarded the Hero of the Russian Federation medal and the honorary title Pilot-Cosmonaut of the Russian Federation. He was decorated with the Order For Merit to the Fatherland IV class, the Medal "For Merit in Space Exploration", and the NASA Space Flight Medal. Lonchokov is a National Prize winner for the Glory of Fatherland in nomination Russia Glory, instituted by the International Academy of Social Sciences and International Academy of Patronage. He is an "Honoured Man of the Aktubinsk region".

== Military career ==
After graduation from pilot school, Lonchakov served as a second crew commander, crew commander, squadron senior pilot, and aviation brigade commander in the Russian Navy. Lonchakov has logged over 1400 hours of flight time, is a Class 1 Air Force pilot, and a paratroop training instructor with 526 jumps.

== Cosmonaut career ==
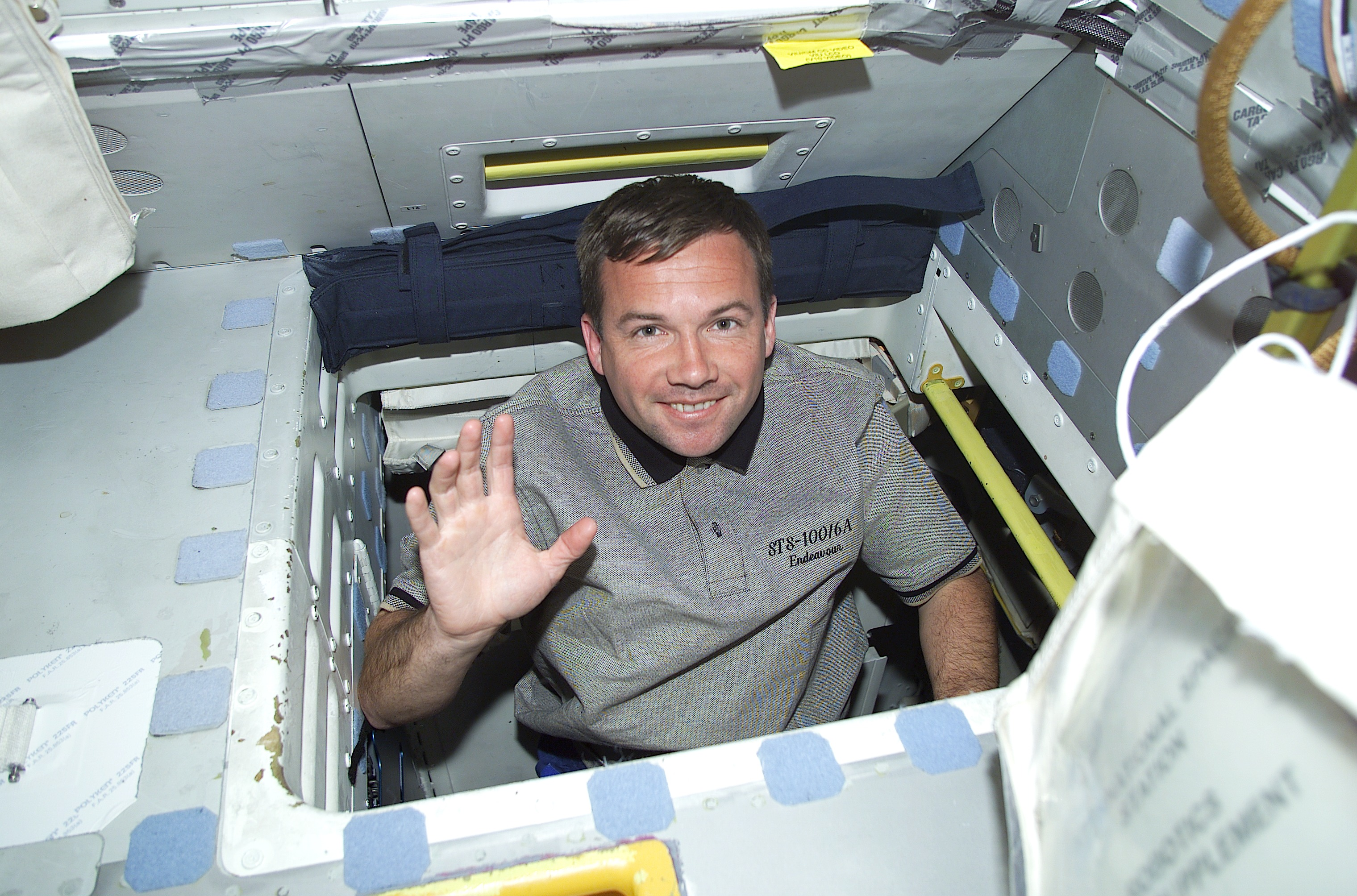
Lonchakov is pictured translating through the passageway between the mid deck and flight deck of Space Shuttle Endeavour.

Lonchakov was selected as a test-cosmonaut candidate of the Gagarin Cosmonaut Training Center Cosmonaut Office in December 1997. In July 2004 he took part in the training for survival in extreme situations at the Baikonur Cosmodrome.

=== STS-100 ===
Lonchakov's first spaceflight was the Space Shuttle mission STS-100 that installed the International Space Station's robotic arm, Canadarm2. Other major objectives for Endeavour's mission were to berth the Raffaello logistics module to the station, activate it, transfer cargo between Raffaello and the station, and reberth Raffaello in the shuttle's payload bay. Space Shuttle Endeavour lifted off from the Kennedy Space Center at 18:40:42 UTC on 19 April 2001. Lonchakov served as a mission specialist. After nearly two days of flight, Endeavour docked with the ISS on 21 April 2001 at 13:59 UTC. After 8 days of docked operations, the shuttle undocked from the ISS at 17:34 UTC on 19 April. Landing was originally planned at KSC however continuing cloud cover, rain showers and gusty winds forced Endeavour to land at Edwards Air Force Base in California. The mission duration of STS-100 was 11 days, 21 hours, 31 minutes, 14 seconds.

=== Soyuz TMA-1/TM-34 ===
On 25 March 2002, Lonchakov passed training for a spaceflight as the backup crew commander of the Soyuz-TM, Soyuz-TMA spacecraft, 4th visiting crew under the ISS program. On 1 October 2002, he was selected for the prime crew as flight engineer-2 and remained the backup crew commander.

Lonchakov returned to the ISS in October 2002 as a crewmember of the Soyuz taxi flight Soyuz TMA-1. The Soyuz spacecraft carrying commander Lonchakov, flight engineer cosmonaut Sergei Zalyotin and ESA astronaut Frank De Winne lifted off from the Baikonour Cosmodrome on 30 October 2002, at 03:11 UTC. Thick fog on the ground obscured the launch from the cameras, which showed only a silhouette of the rocket and the flame exhaust. The successful docking between the Soyuz TMA-1 and the ISS did take place at 05:01 UTC on 1 November 2002. After spending 10 days, 20 hours and 53 minutes in space Lonchakov returned to Earth on Soyuz TM-34. The Soyuz TM-34 spacecraft, undocked from the nadir port of the Zarya module of the ISS on 9 November at 20:44 GMT and landed 100 km north east of Arkalyk on 10 November 2002 at 00:04 UTC. Soyuz TM-34 was the last of the Soyuz-TM spacecraft and was replaced by the Soyuz-TMA.

=== Expedition 18 ===
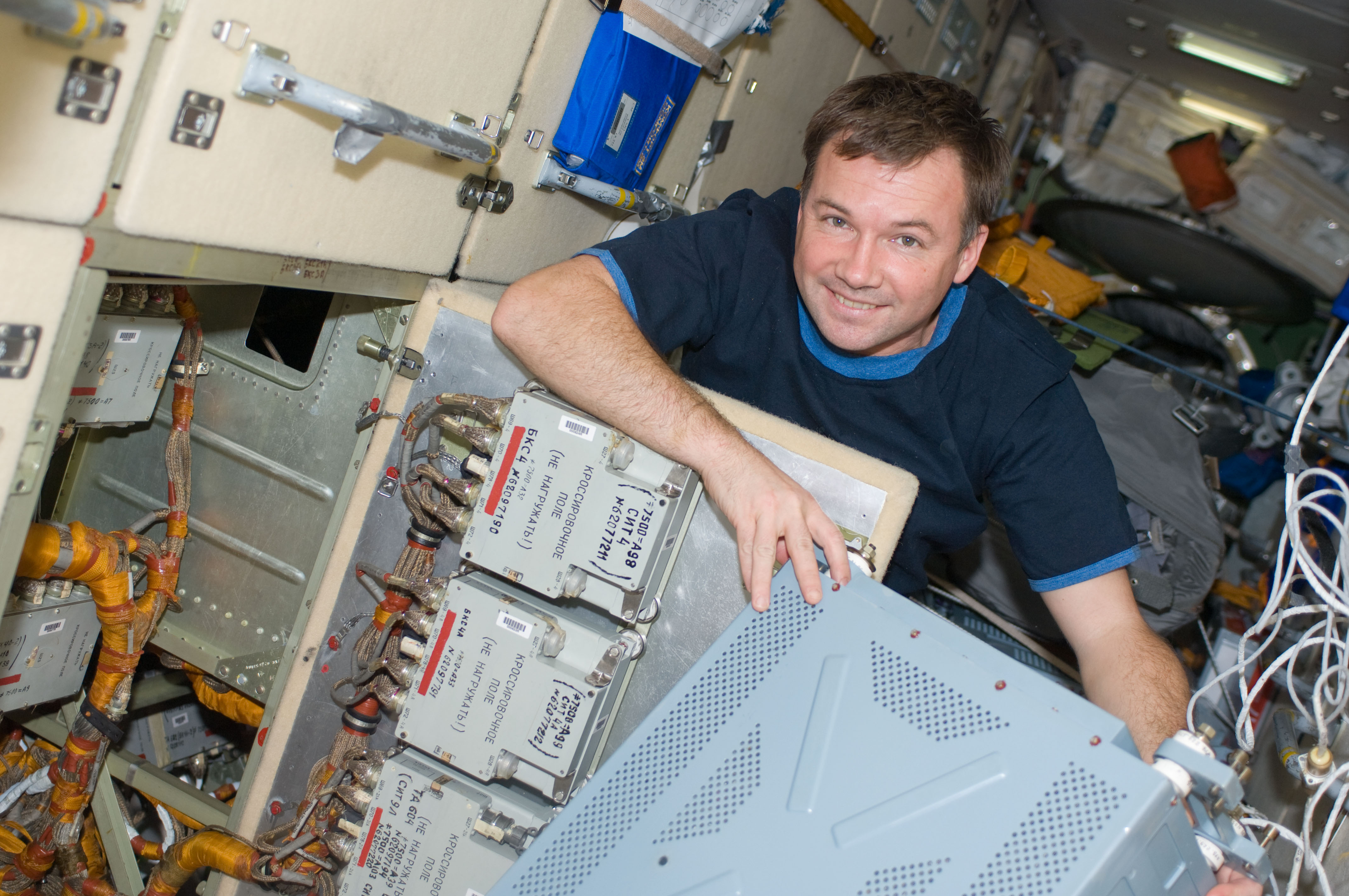
Yury Lonchakov, Expedition 18 flight engineer, in the Zarya module of the ISS.

Lonchakov was originally selected to be a flight engineer on Expedition 19, but was transferred to the Expedition 18 crew as a flight engineer and Soyuz commander, after Salizhan Sharipov was removed from the crew. The Soyuz TMA-13 spacecraft with Lonchakov, Expedition 18 commander Michael Fincke and space tourist Richard Garriott launched on 12 October 2008 at 7:01 UTC. Lonchakov served as the Soyuz commander. After a two-day autonomous flight, Soyuz TMA-13 successfully docked to the Earth-facing docking port of the Zarya module of the ISS on 14 October at 08:26 GMT, seven minutes ahead of schedule. Lonchakov joined the ISS Expedition 18 crew as a flight engineer. While Richard Garriott was aboard, Lonchakov participated during his personal time (along with Michael Fincke, Gregory Chamitoff and Richard Garriott) in filming and starring in a science-fiction movie made in space, Apogee of Fear.

On 12 March 2009, a piece of debris from the upper stage of a Delta II rocket used to launch a GPS satellite in 1993, passed close to the ISS. The Expedition 18 crew prepared to evacuate the ISS by closing hatches between modules, and boarding the Soyuz spacecraft that was docked to provide emergency crew escape. The debris did not hit the space station and safely passed by at 16:38 UTC, and the crew were cleared to resume operations about five minutes later.

Lonchakov returned to Earth with NASA astronaut Michael Fincke and spaceflight participant Charles Simonyi. The Soyuz TMA-13 capsule landed in Kazakhstan on 8 April 2009, at 7:16 UTC.

=== Spacewalks ===
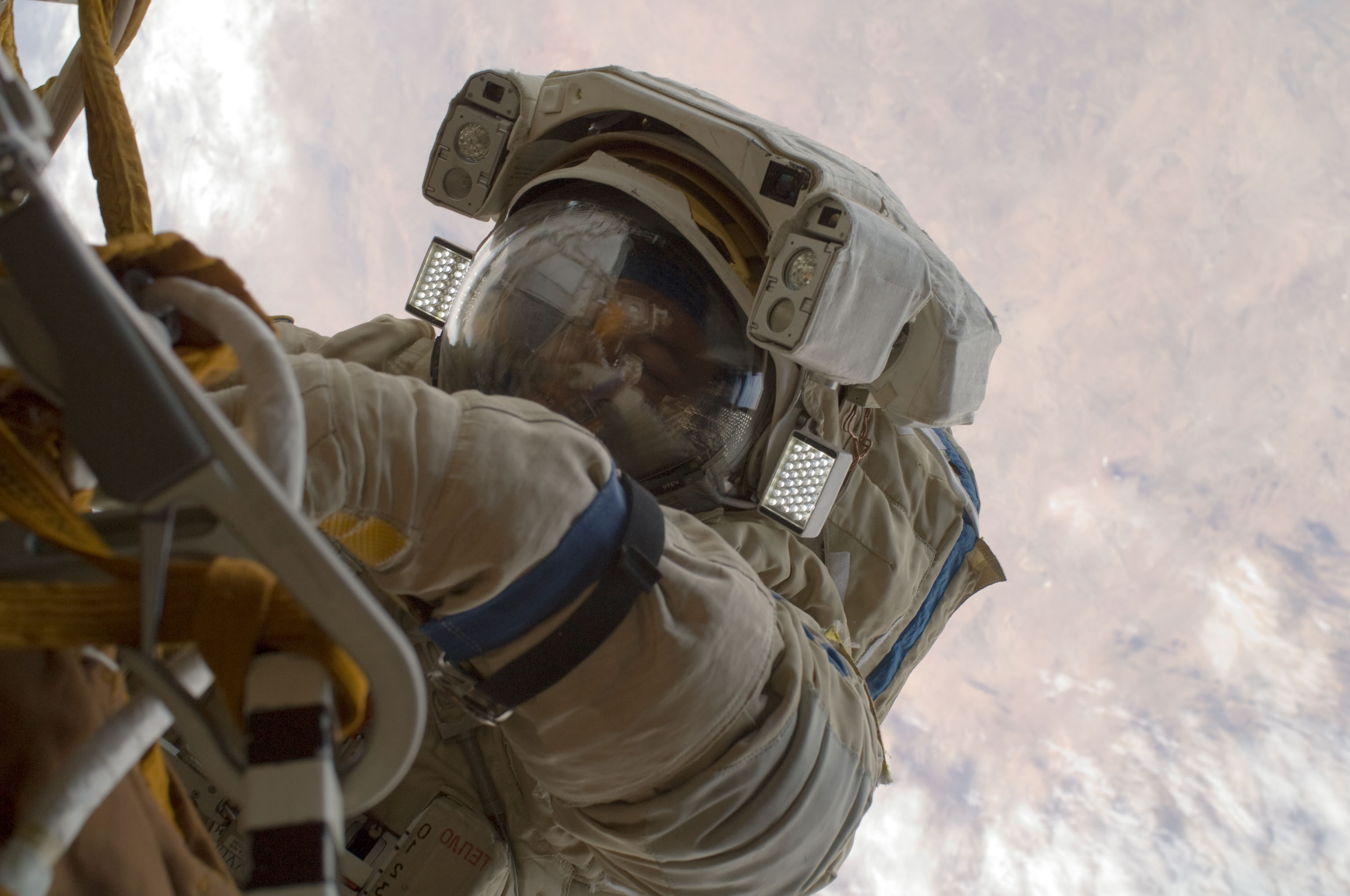
Yuri Lonchakov participates in a spacewalk on 23 December 2008.

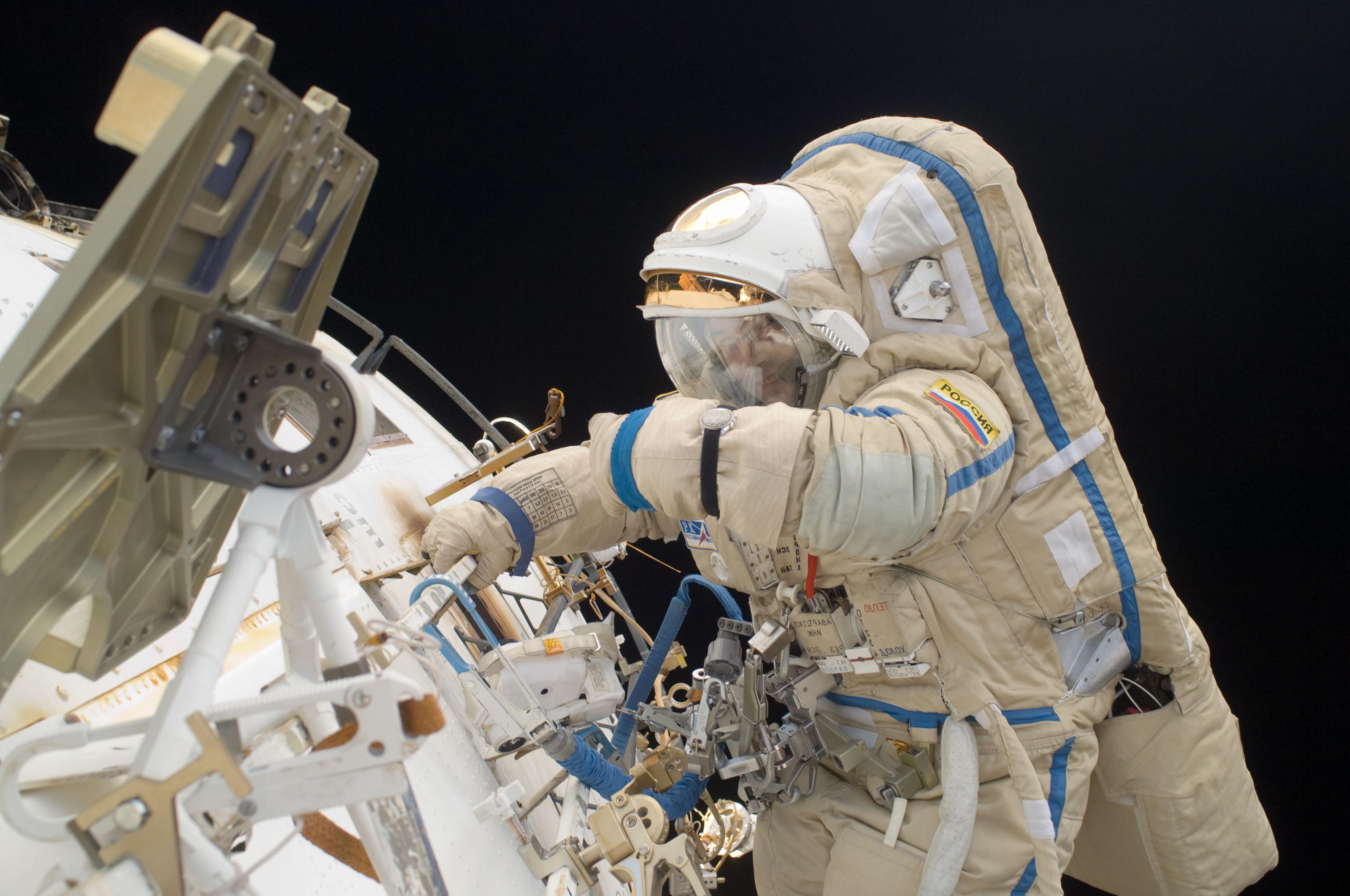
Yuri Lonchakov participates in a spacewalk on 10 March 2009.

Lonchakov has performed two career spacewalks totalling 10 hours and 27 minutes.

On 23 December 2008, Lonchakov performed his first career spacewalk with NASA astronaut Michael Fincke. They installed an electromagnetic energy measuring device, (Langmuir probe) on Pirs, removed the Russian Biorisk long-duration experiment, installed the Exposing Specimens of Organic and Biological Materials to Open Space (Expose-R) experiment package on Zvezda, but subsequently removed it after it failed to activate and transmit telemetry on ground command. The two spacewalkers also installed the Impulse experiment which measures disturbances in the ionosphere around the space station. The EVA was conducted from Pirs airlock in Russian Orlan space suits. The spacewalk lasted 5 hours and 38 minutes.

On 10 March 2009, Lonchakov performed his second career spacewalk, again with Fincke. The two spacewalkers installed the EXPOSE-R experiment onto the universal science platform of the Zvezda module, removed tape straps from the area of the docking target on the Pirs airlock and docking compartment, inspected and photographed the exterior of the Russian portion of the station. The spacewalk was conducted from Pirs Docking Compartment airlock in Russian Orlan space suits. and came to a close at 21:11 UTC when the airlock hatch was closed. The spacewalk lasted 4 hours and 49 minutes and marked the 120th spacewalk in support of space station assembly and maintenance.

=== Resignation ===
In 2013, he submitted his resignation, effective 14 September. It was announced that he was resigning for a more interesting job. Lonchakov had been scheduled to fly on Expedition 44 to the International Space Station, and at the time of announcement, no replacement had been named. Gennady Padalka was his replacement.

== Post-space career ==
Lonchakov resigned from the cosmonaut corps and took up a position at Gazprom. On 31 March 2014 he was appointed acting head of GCTC.

== See also ==
- List of Heroes of the Russian Federation
