= Soyuz TMA-1 =

2002 Russian crewed spaceflight to the ISS

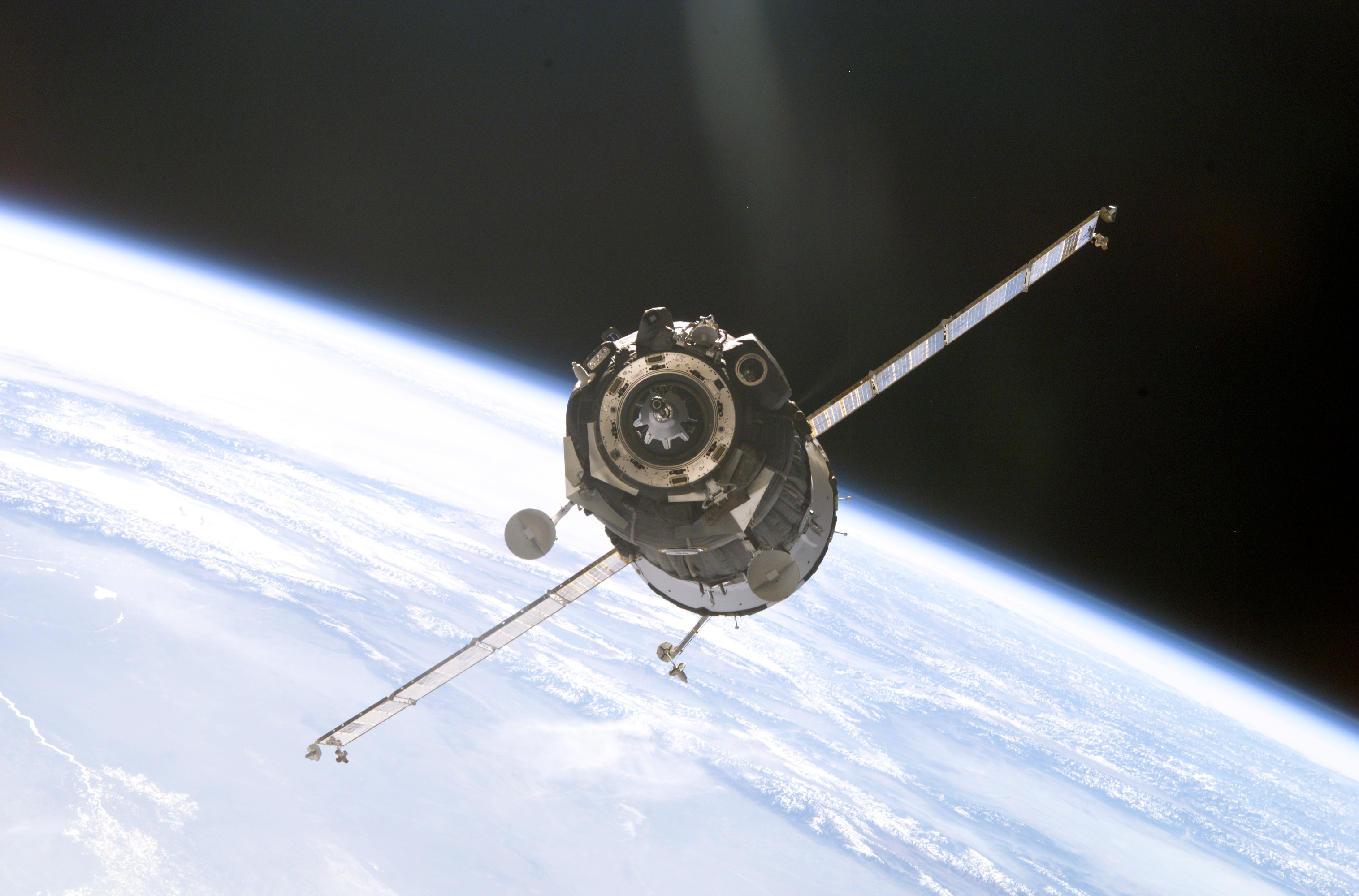
- TMA-1 approaches the ISS
- Mission type: ISS crew transport
- Operator: Russian Space Agency
- COSPAR ID: 2002-050A
- SATCAT no.: 27552
- Mission duration: 185 days, 22 hours, 53 minutes, 14 seconds
- Orbits completed: ~3,020

Spacecraft properties
- Spacecraft: Soyuz-TMA-1 11F732 No. 211
- Spacecraft type: Soyuz-TMA
- Manufacturer: Energia

Crew
- Crew size: 3
- Launching: Sergei Zalyotin; Frank De Winne; Yury Lonchakov
- Landing: Nikolai Budarin; Kenneth Bowersox; Donald Pettit
- Callsign: Yenisey

Start of mission
- Launch date: October 30, 2002, 03:11:11 UTC
- Rocket: Soyuz-FG
- Launch site: Baikonur, Site 1/5
- Contractor: Progress

End of mission
- Landing date: May 4, 2003, 02:04:25 UTC
- Landing site: Kazakh Steppe (49°37′47″N 61°20′36″E)

Orbital parameters
- Reference system: Geocentric orbit
- Regime: Low Earth orbit
- Perigee altitude: 387 km (240 mi)
- Apogee altitude: 395 km (245 mi)
- Inclination: 51.63°
- Period: 92.4 minutes
- Epoch: 6 November 2002

Docking with ISS
- Docking port: Pirs nadir
- Docking date: 1 November 2002, 05:01:20 UTC
- Undocking date: 3 May 2003, 22:43:00 UTC
- Time docked: 183 days, 17 hours, 41 minutes, 40 seconds
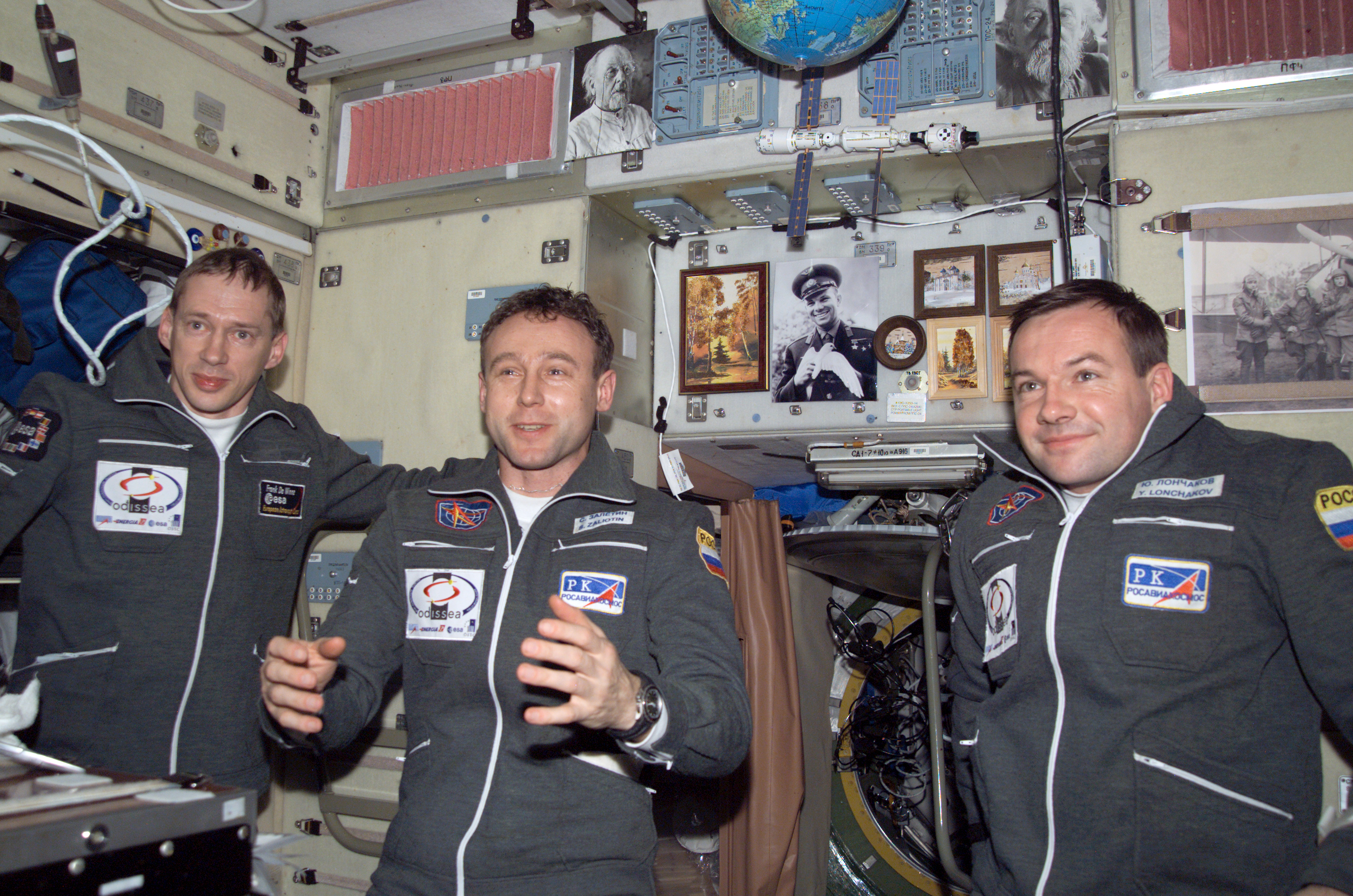
- Launching mission insignia Launching crew, from left: De Winne, Zalyotin and Lonchakov Soyuz programme

Soyuz TMA-1 (Note: T – транспортный – Transportnyi – meaning transport, M – модифицированный – Modifitsirovannyi – meaning modified, A – антропометрический, – Antropometricheskii meaning anthropometric).), also catalogued as Soyuz TM-35, was a 2002 Soyuz mission to the International Space Station (ISS) launched by a Soyuz FG launch vehicle with a Russian-Belgian cosmonaut crew blasted off from the Baikonur Cosmodrome in Kazakhstan. This was the fifth Russian Soyuz spacecraft to fly to the ISS. It was also the first flight of the TMA-class Soyuz spacecraft. Soyuz TM-34 was the last of the prior Soyuz-TM spacecraft to be launched. The European segment of the mission was called "Odissea".

== Crew ==
Position	Launching crew	Landing crew
Commander	(Russia) Sergei Zalyotin, RSA; Second and last spaceflight	(Russia) Nikolai Budarin, RSA; Expedition 6 Soyuz Commander; Third and last spaceflight
Flight Engineer	(Belgium) Frank De Winne, ESA; First spaceflight	(United States) Kenneth Bowersox, NASA; Expedition 6 ISS Commander/Soyuz Flight Engineer; Fifth and last spaceflight
Flight Engineer	(Russia) Yury Lonchakov, RSA; Second spaceflight	(United States) Donald Pettit, NASA; Expedition 6 Flight Engineer; First spaceflight

== Mission parameters ==
- Mass: 7,220 kg (15,910 lb), gross
- Perigee: 193 km
- Apogee: 235 km
- Inclination: 51.6°
- Period: 88.7 minutes

=== Docking with ISS ===
- Docked to ISS: November 1, 2002, 05:01 UTC (to Pirs module)
- Undocked from ISS: May 3, 2003, 22:43 UTC (from Pirs module)

== Specifications ==
Section ref: Astro

- Gross mass: 7,220 kg (15,910 lb).
- Unfuelled mass: 6,320 kg (13,930 lb).
- Height: 6.98 m (22.90 ft).
- Diameter: 2.20 m (7.20 ft).
- Span: 10.70 m (35.10 ft).
- Thrust: 3.92 kN (881 lbf).
- Specific impulse: 305 s.

== Mission highlights ==
In the spring of 2001, a taxi mission to the space station was being scheduled to take place in October 2002. At first the crew was to be commander Sergei Zalyotin and flight engineer Frank De Winne; however, a report released in February 2002 stated that American musician Lance Bass was interested in joining the crew for a one-week mission on board the Russian spacecraft. The mission began to fall through, and by September 2002 they had discontinued the training of Lance Bass due to the mission organizers' failure to meet the terms of the contract. They filled the vacant seat left by Lance Bass with Russian cosmonaut Yuri Lonchakov.

While the Soyuz TMA-1 was on orbit, the Space Shuttle Columbia disaster occurred and required a change in crew changeout process. The Soyuz system became the sole method for crew to launch to and return from the ISS until the space shuttle was returned to service in July 2005.

Soyuz TMA-1 disembarked from ISS on May 4, 2003 and immediately began its return to Earth, marking the first entry and descent for this Soyuz class. A technical malfunction caused the Soyuz control system to abandon the gentler controlled entry and descent and instead fall back to the harsher ballistic reentry and descent. This resulted in a steep and off target landing of the spacecraft. The craft landed 300 miles short of the planned area, and the crew was subjected to severe acceleration loads. Communication with the Soyuz was lost because one antenna was ripped off during descent, and two more did not deploy. The crew regained communications through an emergency transmitter after landing. Due to this event, future crews would be provided with a satellite phone to establish contact with recovery forces.

Subsequent Soyuz TMA missions were able to successfully execute controlled reentries until the Soyuz TMA-10 and Soyuz TMA-11 missions which both also reverted to ballistic descents.

Don Pettit, concerned that the film documenting his science experiments on the ISS would be damaged by space radiation before the next Shuttle could bring it home, decided to secure the film and other items in a 20-kilogram (44 lb) pack he placed on his chest during reentry. While a normal Soyuz entry involves 3 G's, the ballistic reentry subjecting the crew to over 8 G's. This extreme force made the pack feel like a 160-kilogram (350 lb) weight pressing down on Pettit's chest. Pettit was left exhausted and reportedly dislocated a shoulder, but the space agencies downplayed the situation saying the astronauts were in good shape.
