= A Rose Is a Rose =

Single by Meredith Edwards

from the album Reach
- B-side: "Slow Learner"
- Released: February 3, 2001
- Genre: Country
- Length: 3:01
- Label: Mercury
- Songwriters: Deanna Bryant, Sunny Russ, Dave Berg
- Producer: Keith Stegall

Meredith Edwards singles chronology
"A Rose Is a Rose" (2001)	"The Bird Song" (2001)

"A Rose Is a Rose" is a debut song recorded by American country music artist Meredith Edwards. It was released in February 2001 as the first single from the album Reach. The song reached #37 on the Billboard Hot Country Singles & Tracks chart. The song was written by Deanna Bryant, Sunny Russ and Dave Berg.

== Critical reception ==
A review in Billboard was positive, stating that "within a female act the notion as though they are going to great lengths to sound, sound. A sophisticated relay can negate that one can get busy trying to dazzle the listener with their voice. A slight neglect to convey the emotion in the lyric. Not apparent with Edwards."

== Chart performance ==
Chart (2001)	Peak position
US Hot Country Songs (Billboard)	37

== See also ==
- Rose is a rose is a rose is a rose
