= Out of Sync (book) =

Memoir written by Lance Bass

- Author: Lance Bass
- Publisher: Simon & Schuster
- Publication date: October 23, 2007
- Media type: Print (Hardcover)
- Pages: 195
- ISBN: 978-1-4169-4788-2
- OCLC: 154308977
- Dewey Decimal: 782.42164092 B 22
- LC Class: ML420.B1863 A3 2007

Out of Sync: A Memoir is the autobiography of American pop singer Lance Bass, published on October 23, 2007. It features an introduction by Marc Eliot, a New York Times best-selling biographer, and was published by Simon Spotlight Entertainment, a division of Simon & Schuster. The book debuted on The New York Times Best Seller list at #22 for the week of November 11, 2007. Bass dedicated the book to his family, friends, and fans.

The 195-page book is divided into eight chapters followed by an acknowledgment chapter with short passages about important people in Bass's life, including all four of his bandmates in NSYNC and close celebrity friends. The book covers Bass's childhood growing up in rural Mississippi, his rise to fame as a member of the successful pop group *NSYNC, its dissolution, and his efforts to obtain a seat on the Russian TMA-1 mission to the International Space Station. Bass also documents multiple gay relationships, his first sexual experience, and his struggle to keep his sexuality hidden during the height of NSYNC. The memoir details his public coming out via the cover story of People magazine's issue of July 26, 2006.
