= Meredith Edwards (singer) =

American singer

Background information
- Born: Meredith Leigh Edwards; March 15, 1984 (age 42); Clinton, Mississippi, United States
- Genre: Country
- Occupation: Singer
- Instrument: Vocals
- Years active: 2000–2001
- Label: Mercury

Meredith Leigh Edwards (born March 15, 1984) is an American country music singer. She recorded an album, Reach, for Mercury Records Nashville in 2001. This album accounted for two singles on the Billboard country singles charts.

At the age of five, she was a member of the traveling choir the Mississippi Show Stoppers, along with Lance Bass of *NSYNC.

Lance had signed Meredith to his own management called Free Lance Entertainment. In 2001, she released her first CD, Reach, under the Mercury label. The album debuted at No. 24 on the Top Country Albums chart and was produced by Richard Marx. Its singles, "A Rose Is a Rose" and "The Bird Song", both charted on Hot Country Singles & Tracks (now Hot Country Songs) at No. 37 and No. 47 respectively. Edwards has not recorded since Reach.

== Discography ==
=== Albums ===
Title	Album details	Peak chart positions	
Title	Album details	US Country	US Heat
Reach	Release date: June 5, 2001; Label: Free Lance/Mercury Nashville	24	18

=== Singles ===
Year	Single	Peak positions	Album
Year	Single	US Country	Album
2001	"A Rose Is a Rose"	37	Reach
2001	"The Bird Song"	47	Reach

=== Music videos ===
Year	Video	Director
2001	"A Rose Is a Rose"	Deaton-Flanigen Productions
