= Soyuz TM-34 =

2002 Russian crewed spaceflight to the ISS

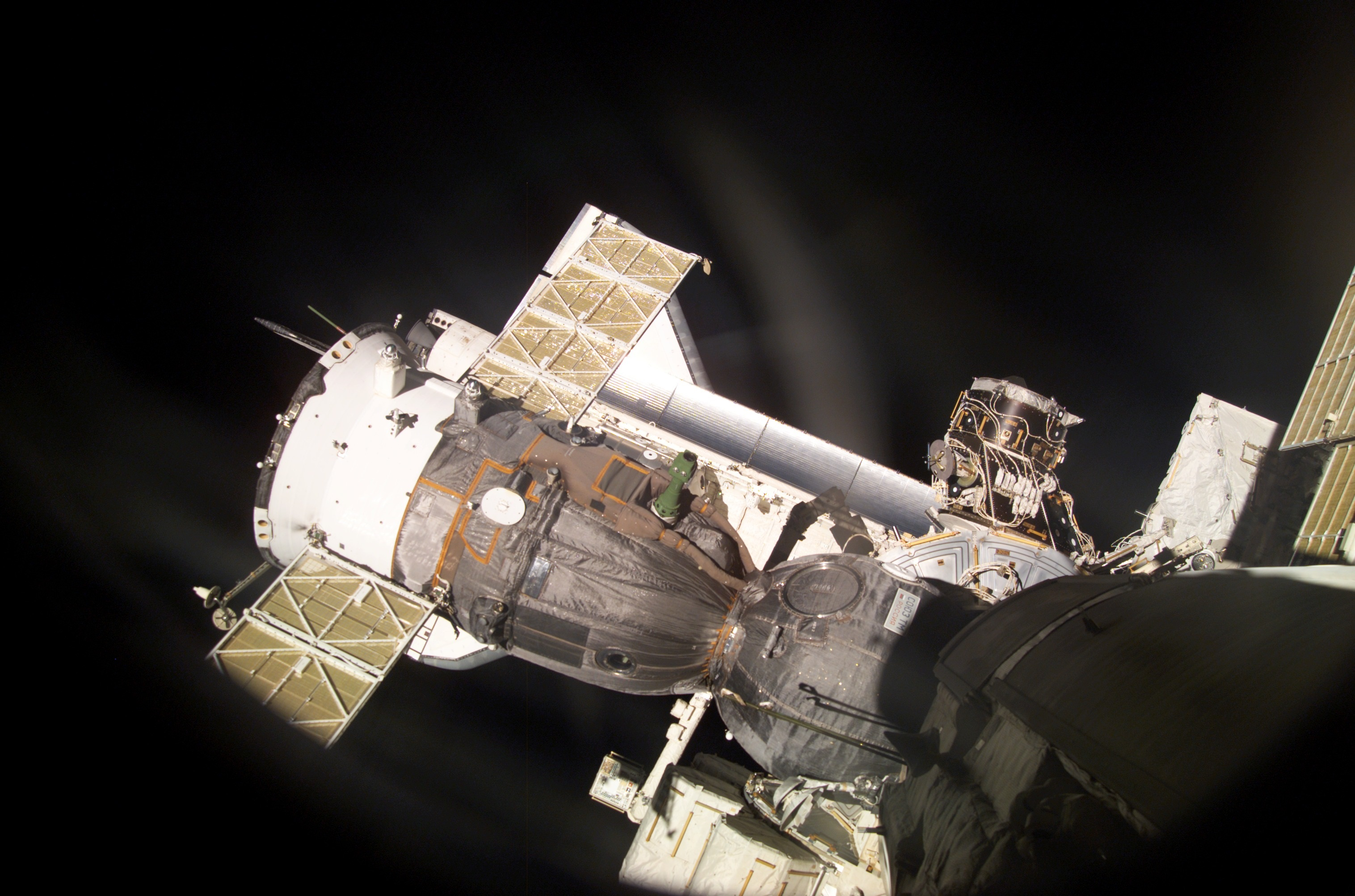
- TM-34 docked to the ISS
- Mission type: ISS crew transport
- Operator: Russian Space Agency
- COSPAR ID: 2002-020A
- SATCAT no.: 27416
- Mission duration: 198 days, 17 hours, 37 minutes, 45 seconds
- Orbits completed: ~3,235

Spacecraft properties
- Spacecraft: Soyuz-TM
- Spacecraft type: Soyuz-TM
- Manufacturer: Energia

Crew
- Crew size: 3
- Launching: Yuri Gidzenko; Roberto Vittori; Mark Shuttleworth
- Landing: Sergei Zalyotin; Frank De Winne; Yury Lonchakov
- Callsign: Uran

Start of mission
- Launch date: April 25, 2002, 06:26:35 UTC
- Rocket: Soyuz-U
- Launch site: Baikonur, Site 1/5
- Contractor: Progress

End of mission
- Landing date: November 10, 2002, 00:04:20 UTC
- Landing site: 80 kilometres (50 mi) NE of Arkalyk

Orbital parameters
- Reference system: Geocentric
- Regime: Low Earth
- Perigee altitude: 193 kilometres (120 mi)
- Apogee altitude: 247 kilometres (153 mi)
- Inclination: 51.6 degrees
- Period: 88.6 minutes

Docking with ISS
- Docking port: Zarya nadir
- Docking date: 27 April 2002; 07:55 UTC
- Undocking date: 9 November 2002; 20:44 UTC
- Time docked: 196d 12h 49m
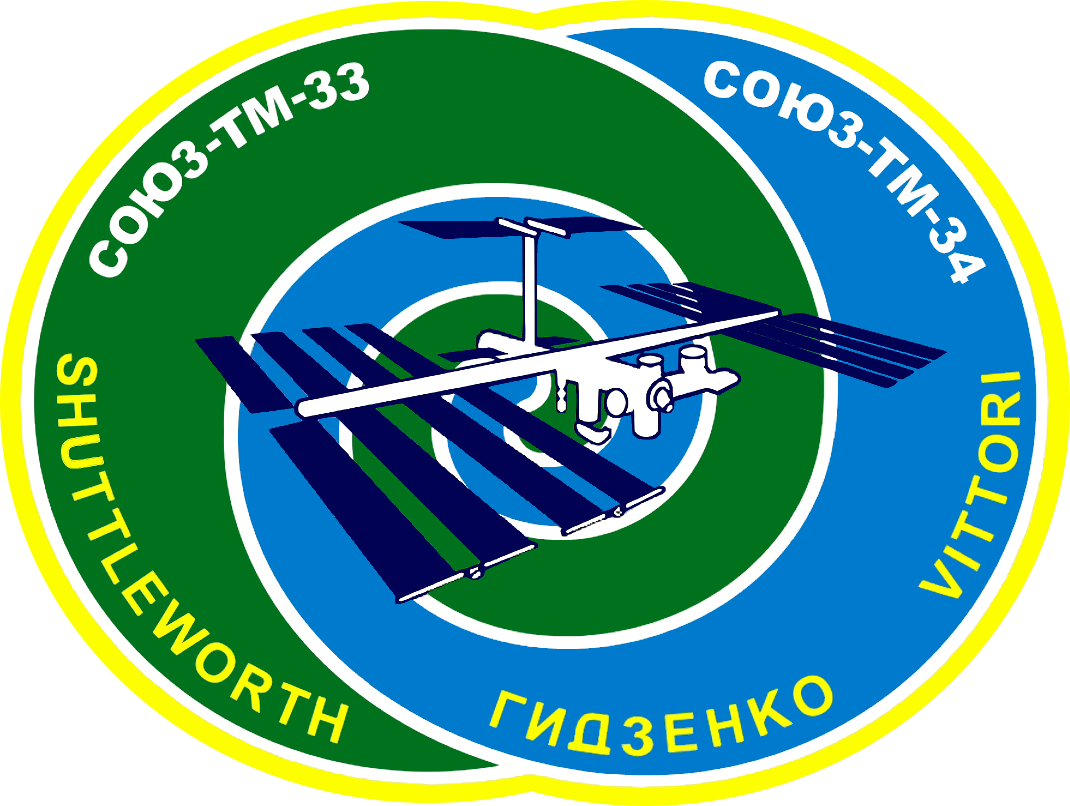
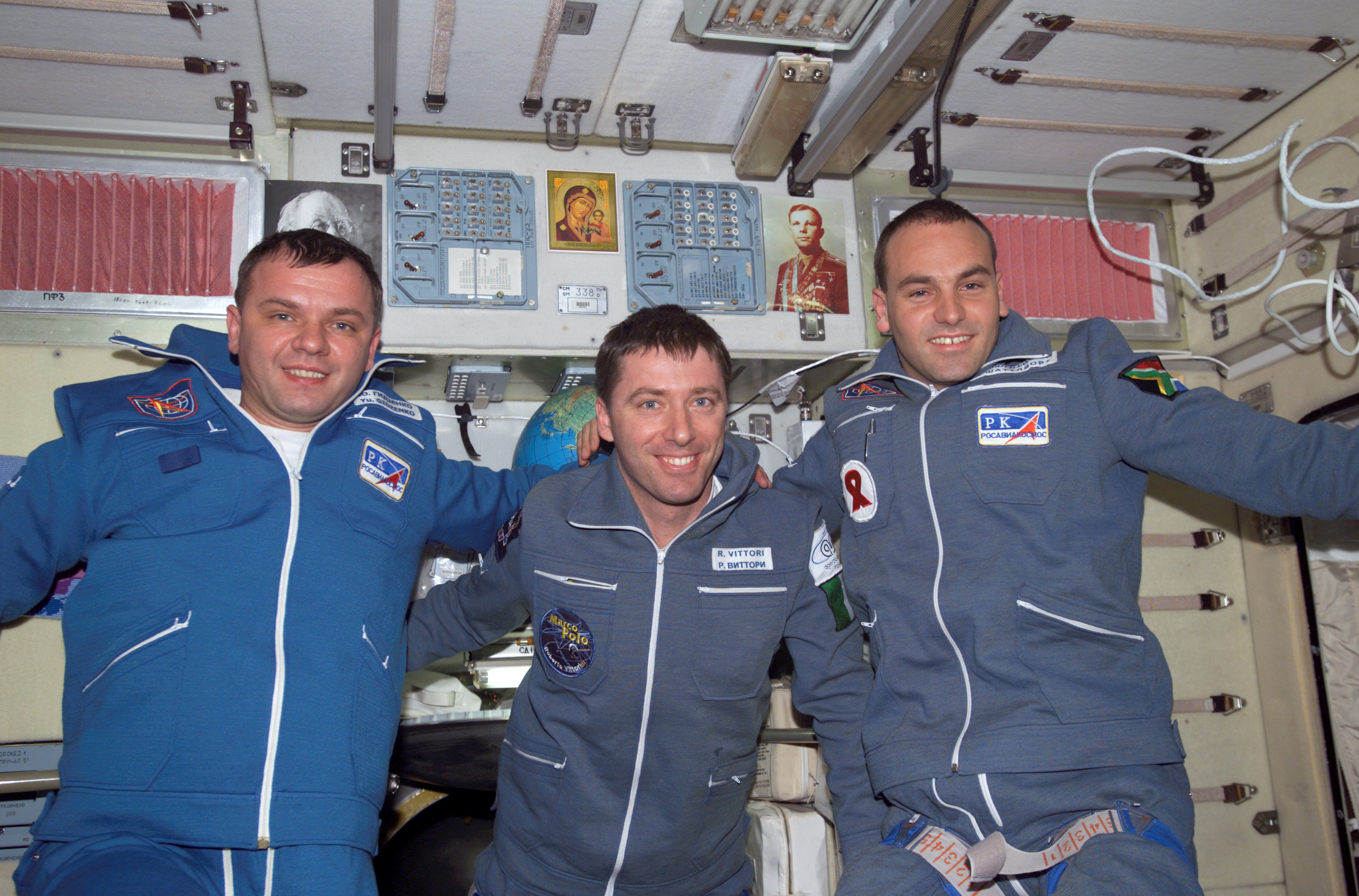
- Soyuz programme (Crewed missions)

Soyuz TM-34 was the fourth Soyuz mission to the International Space Station (ISS). Soyuz TM-34 was launched by a Soyuz-U launch vehicle. The European segment of the mission was called "Marco Polo".

== Crew ==
Position	Launching crew	Landing crew
Commander	(Russia) Yuri Gidzenko, RSA; Third and last spaceflight	(Russia) Sergei Zalyotin, RSA; Second and last spaceflight
Flight Engineer	(Italy) Roberto Vittori, ESA; First spaceflight	(Belgium) Frank De Winne, ESA; First spaceflight
Spaceflight Participant/Flight Engineer	(South Africa) Mark Shuttleworth, SA; Only spaceflight Tourist	(Russia) Yury Lonchakov, RSA; Second spaceflight

== Docking with ISS ==
- Docked to ISS: April 27, 2002, 07:55 UTC (to nadir port of Zarya)
- Undocked from ISS: November 9, 2002, 20:44 UTC (from nadir port of Zarya)

== Mission highlights ==
This was the 17th crewed mission to ISS.

Soyuz TM-34 was a Russian Soyuz TM passenger transportation craft that was launched by a Soyuz-U rocket from Baikonur at 06:26 UT on 25 April 2002. It carried two cosmonauts and a South African tourist, Mark Shuttleworth, to the International Space Station (ISS). Shuttleworth performed some biology experiments, as he carried a live rat and sheep stem cells. All three returned on Soyuz TM-33 after an eight-day mission.

Soyuz TM-34 was the final flight of the Soyuz-TM variant, due to its replacement by the upgraded Soyuz-TMA. It was also the last crewed vehicle to launch atop the Soyuz-U rocket, although the Soyuz-U continued to launch uncrewed vehicles until 2017.
