= Reach (Meredith Edwards album) =

Studio album by Meredith Edwards
- Released: June 5, 2001
- Genre: Country
- Length: 46:33
- Label: Free Lance/Mercury Nashville
- Producer: Richard Marx; Keith Stegall; Robin Wiley

Reach is the only studio album by American country music artist Meredith Edwards. It was released in 2001 by Mercury Nashville and peaked at No. 24 on the Billboard Top Country Albums chart. The album includes the singles "A Rose Is a Rose" and "The Bird Song."

Keith Stegall produced the album, except for "Ready to Fall" (featured on the On the Line soundtrack and in its theatrical trailer) and "This Is the Heartache" (produced by Richard Marx), and "The Bird Song", "You Get to Me", "But I Can't Let You Go", and "You" (produced by Robin Wiley).

== Track listing ==
No.	Title	Writer(s)	Length
1.	"In Any Given Moment"	Daryl Burgess, Tia Sillers	4:11
2.	"A Rose Is a Rose"	Dave Berg, Deanna Bryant, Sunny Russ	3:01
3.	"The Bird Song"	Buzz Cason, Neil Thrasher	3:58
4.	"Ready to Fall"	Richard Marx	3:38
5.	"A Beautiful Mess"	Tony Martin, Bob Regan	2:41
6.	"You Get to Me"	Steve Mandile, Robin Wiley	3:55
7.	"But I Can't Let You Go" (featuring David Nail)	Wiley	4:26
8.	"Slow Learner"	Al Anderson, Regan	3:44
9.	"This Is the Heartache"	Gary Harrison, Marx	4:18
10.	"Reach"	Marx, Keith Stegall	4:46
11.	"You"	Brett James, Troy Verges	4:04
12.	"Places in Your Heart"	Marvin Morrow	3:51

== Personnel ==
- Eddie Bayers - drums
- Tim Buppert - background vocals
- J.T. Corenflos - electric guitar
- Eric Darken - percussion
- Meredith Edwards - lead vocals
- Paul Franklin - steel guitar, lap steel guitar, slide guitar
- Bruce Gaitsch - acoustic guitar
- Aubrey Haynie - fiddle, mandolin
- John Kelton - bass guitar
- Steve Mandile - electric guitar
- Marilyn Martin - background vocals
- Brent Mason - electric guitar
- Joey Miskulin - accordion
- Duncan Mullins - bass guitar
- David Nail - background vocals on "But I Can't Let You Go"
- Lee Roy Parnell - slide guitar
- Gary Prim - keyboards, piano
- Robin Wiley - background vocals
- John Willis - acoustic guitar
- Glenn Worf - bass guitar
- Jonathan Yudkin - fiddle

== Chart performance ==
Chart (2001)	Peak position
U.S. Billboard Top Country Albums	24
U.S. Billboard Top Heatseekers	18
