= Sergey Zalyotin =

Russian cosmonaut (born 1962)

Sergei Zalyotin
- Сергей Залëтин
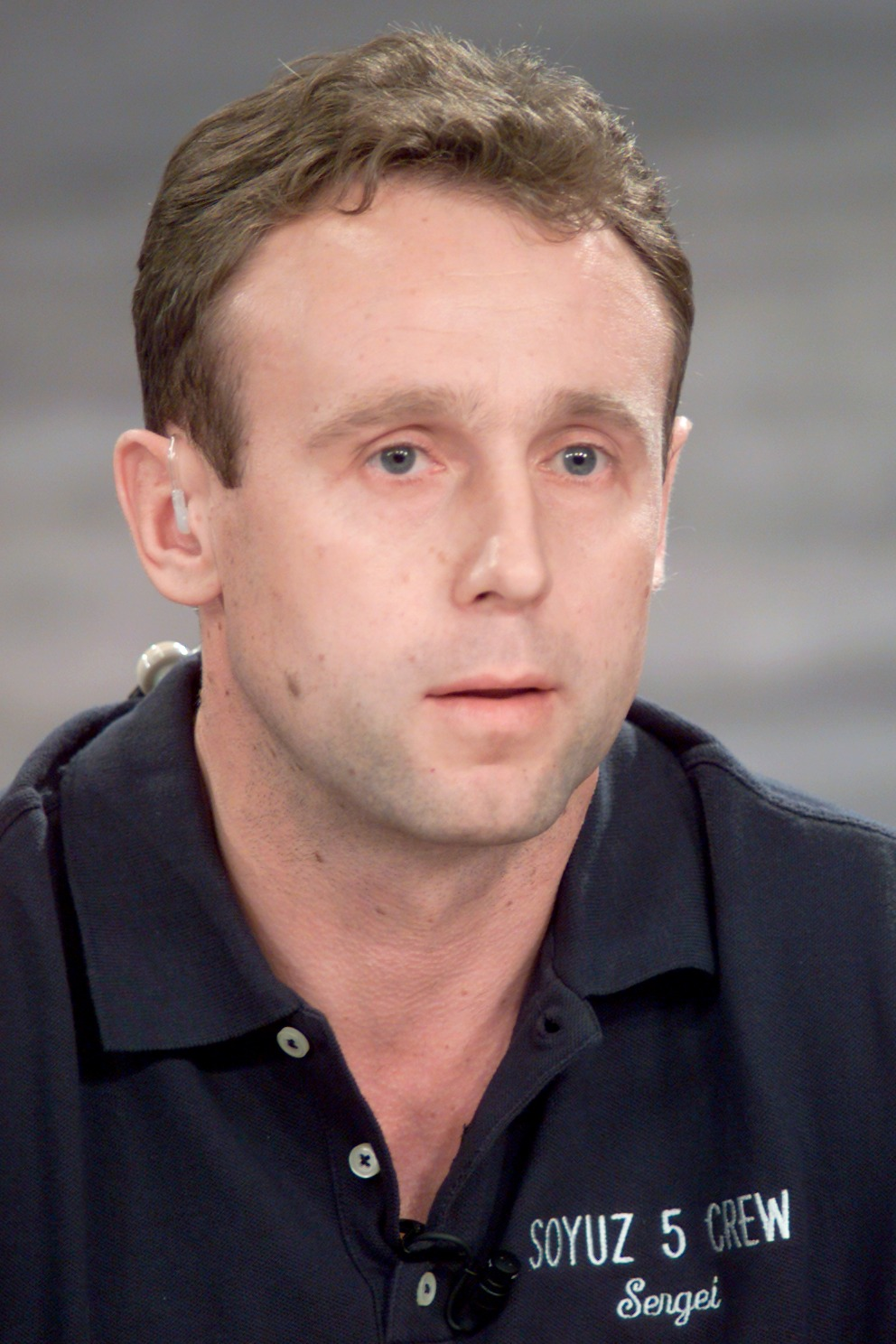
- Born: April 21, 1962 (age 64); Shchyokino, Russian SFSR, Soviet Union
- Occupation: Pilot
- Awards: Hero of the Russian Federation
- Space career

Roscosmos cosmonaut
- Status: Retired
- Rank: Colonel, Russian Air Force
- Time in space: 83d 16h 36m
- Selection: 1990 TsPK Cosmonaut Group
- Total EVAs: 1
- Total EVA time: 5h, 3m
- Missions: Soyuz TM-30 (Mir EO-28), Soyuz TMA-1/Soyuz TM-34 (ISS EP-4)
- Mission insignia

Sergei Viktorovich Zalyotin (Russian: Серге́й Викторович Залётин; born April 21, 1962) is a Russian cosmonaut and a veteran of two space missions.

Zalyotin was born in Tula and attended the Borisoglebsk Higher Military School before becoming a fighter pilot in the Russian Air Force. He also holds a degree in ecological management. Zalyotin was selected as a cosmonaut candidate in 1990. In 2000, Zalyotin was a member of the final resident crew aboard the Mir space station. He briefly visited the International Space Station aboard Soyuz TMA-1 in 2002.

== Personal ==
Born April 21, 1962, Schekino, Tula Area, RF (Russia). Father: Viktor Dmitrievich Zaletin (1930–1988). Mother: Valentina Ivanovna Zaletina (Prokhorova), born in 1926. Married to Elena Mikhailovna Zaletina (Goriacheva), they have one son.

== Education ==
In 1983 he graduated from Borisoglebsk Higher Military Pilot School after V.P. Chkalov and got a diploma of pilot-engineer. In 1994 after tuition by correspondence at the International Center of Training Systems he got a qualification of engineer-ecologist and a degree of Master of ecological management.

== Experience ==
In 1983-1990 he served as a pilot, master pilot and flight leader in Air Force units of Moscow military region and in 1990 he was enlisted in the cosmonaut detachment. From October 1990 to March 1992 he passed a course of general space training at Yu. A. Gagarin Cosmonaut Training Center and on March 11, 1992, the qualification of a test-cosmonaut was conferred on him by decision of the Interdepartmental Qualification Committee. In 1992-1997 he passed training under the programme of flights to the Mir Station. From September 1997 to July 1998 he passed training as the backup crew commander under PC-26 programme on the Mir Station.

From October 1998 to March 1999 he was a co-ordinator of Yu. A. Gagarin Cosmonaut Training Center at NASA.

In March - May 1999 he passed training as the prime crew commander under PC-28 programme on the Mir Station, however because of the lack of the required financing in June 1999 General Designers' Review adopted a decision to cancel launch of PC-28 for a time and shift flight the Mir Station into the unmanned flight mode. From June 1999 to March 2000 he passed training as the commander of the prime crew for PC-28.

From April 4 to June 16, 2000, he performed the first space flight as the commander of the Soyuz TM-30 spacecraft and Mir Orbital Complex under PC-28 programme together with A. Kaleri. In the course of operations on the orbital complex the crew carried out the station activation. During the flight he performed one egress into open space with a duration of 5 hours 3 minutes.

== Special honors ==
Hero of the Russian Federation, Pilot-Cosmonaut of the Russian Federation.

== See also ==
- List of Heroes of the Russian Federation
