= Women of Wrestling seasons =

Women's professional wrestling promotion

Women of Wrestling (WOW!), is a women's professional wrestling television series and promotion created in 2000 by David McLane, the founder of Gorgeous Ladies of Wrestling. The promotion is based in Los Angeles, California, and is owned by McLane and Los Angeles Lakers owner and president Jeanie Buss.

The promotion's eponymous program has aired in eleven "seasons" since 2000.

== WOW Season 1 (2000–2001) ==
=== Superheroes Roster ===
Ring name	Real name	Notes
Beckie The Farmers Daughter	Renee Intlekofer	Episode 2, 7, 14, 18, 22
Boom Boom The Volcano	Patty Bunya-Ananta	Episode 2, 4, 10, 16
Bronco Billie	Lisa Danielle Rachuba	Episode 1, 7, 12, 18, 22
Caliente	Rachel Iverson	Episode 1, 4, 9, 11, 19
Charlie Davidson	Charlie Davidson	Episode 1, 9,
Danger	Elle Alexander	Episode 3, 4, 10, 16, 18 Former WOW World Champion
Delta Lotta Pain	Jwaundace Candece	
The Disciplinarian	Kristen Davidson	Episode 1, 4, 7, 10, 18, 19, 22
EZ Rider	Eleanor Kerrigan	Episode 1
Farah The Persian Princess	Telma Roshanravan	Episode 1, 10
Hammerin' Heather Steele	Christina Tomaziesski Colby	Episode 1, 4, 7, 8, 18, 19, 21, 22
Ice Cold	Inga Waggoner	Episode 1, 2, 4, 8, 15
Jacklyn Hyde	Vasilika Vanya Marinkovic	Episode 4, 9, 14, 18, 19, 22
Jade	Jennifer Lee Chan	Episode 5, 6, 10, 19
Jane Blond	Ella Carter	Episode 1, 3, 5, 10, 11, 17, 18, 20
Jungle Grrrl	Erica Porter	Episode 1, 5, 7, 10, 15, 17, 18, 20, 22
Kristy Order		
Lana Star	Lana Kinnear	Episode 2, 8, 17, 18, 20
Loca	Cher Ferreyra	
Lotus	Jeannie Kim	Episode 1, 5, 17
Misery	Kristen Davidson	She is the secret identity of The Disciplinarian
Mystery	Nicole Ochoa	Episode 6, 8, 9, 11 She is the secret identity of Vendetta
Nicky Law		Episode 18
Paradise	Maria Nunez	Episode 1, 15
Patti Pizzazz		Episode 2, 4, 5, 22 Formerly known as Patti Pep
The Phantom	Lynnette Thredgold	Episode 3, 6
Poison	Kina Van Vleet	Episode 2, 4, 8, 14, 19, 21 Former protege and personal assistant of Lana Star
Randi Rah Rah		Episode 2, 18, 20
Riot	April Kathryn Littlejohn	Episode 2, 4, 5, 6, 10, 12, 16, 17, 18, 20
Roxy Powers	Natalie T. Yeo	Episode 1, 5, 17, 18, 19, 21
Sandy	Tamie Sheffield	Episode 1, 12, 20
Selina Majors	Selina Majors	Episode 1, 8, 9, 12, 15, 18
Slam Dunk	Famisha Jones-Millman	Episode 1, 3, 5, 7, 11, 12, 16, 18, 19, 21
Summer	Bobbi Billard	Episode 6, 7
Tanja The Warrior Woman	Tanja Richter	Episode 1, 3, 5, 16, 18, 22
Terri Gold	Heather Lee-Millard	Episode 1, 3, 4, 9, 14, 15, 16, 18, 21 WOW World Champion
Thug	Peggy Lee Leather	Episode 1, 7, 8, 12, 15, 18, 21, 22
Vendetta	Nicole Ochoa	
Wendi Wheels	Rebecca Gravell	Episode 1, 3, 4, 8, 10, 11, 16, 18, 22 Formerly known as Sunny

=== Tag Team Roster ===
The Official Tag teams The remaining teams were mainly created for WOW's Tag Team Tournament, although some of the teams continued to team with one another until the end of the first season.

Ring names	Team names	Notes
Beckie The Farmers Daughter Bronco Billie		Episode 3, 16
Boom Boom The Volcano Caliente		Episode 15, 18, 21
Charlie Davidson EZ Rider	Harley's Angels	Episode 3, 15, 17, 18, 21
Charlie Davidson EZ Rider Thug	Harley's Angels	Episode 5
Delta Lotta Pain Loca	Caged Heat	Episode 6, 8, 14, 16, 18, 20, 21 WOW World Tag Team Champions
Delta Lotta Pain Loca Vendetta	Caged Heat	
Farah The Persian Princess Paradise		Episode 6, 9, 18, 22
Ice Cold Poison		Episode 9, 10, 18
Jade Lotus	The Asian Invasion	Episode 8, 11, 18, 21, 22
Kristy Nicky Law	Law & Order	
Lana Star Patti Pizzazz		Episode 9, 10, 18
Misery Mystery	The Daughters of Darkness	Episode 14, 20
Roxy Powers Tanja The Warrior Woman		Episode 9, 14
Sandy Summer	The Beach Patrol	Episode 14, 17, 18

The former teams

Ring names	Team names	Notes
Danger Riot		Episode 11
Patti Pep Randi Rah Rah	Team Spirit	
Sandy Sunny	The Beach Patrol	Episode 1

The unofficial or alliance teams

Ring names	Team names	Notes
Beckie The Farmers Daughter Bronco Billie Terri Gold		Episode 5

=== List of episodes (2000–2001) ===
The series is taped aired on Broadcast syndication and lately streaming aired on the social media account YouTube channel.

Below are the results of the matches aired on the WOW TV show and the approximate dates they aired.

Match No.	Episode 1 (taped on September 1, 2000, aired on October 6, 2000)	Stipulations	Times
1	The Beach Patrol (Sandy and Sunny) defeated Caged Heat (Delta Lotta Pain and Loca) by disqualification	Tag team match	4:46
2	Thug (with Charlie Davidson and EZ Rider) defeated Selina Majors	Singles match	9:55
3	Jungle Grrrl defeated Terri Gold	Singles match	4:10
4	Terri Gold won by last eliminating Thug (Note: Participants of the battle royal for the inaugural WOW World Championship: Bronco Billie, Caliente, Charlie Davidson, The Disciplinarian, EZ Rider, Farah the Persian Princess, Hammerin' Heather Steele, Ice Cold, Jane Blond, Jungle Grrrl, Lotus, Paradise, Roxy Powers, Sandy, Selina Majors, Slam Dunk, Sunny (later Wendi Wheels) and Tanja the Warrior Woman.)	Battle royal for the inaugural WOW World Championship	3:55
Match No.	Episode 2 (taped on September 1, 2000, aired on October 13, 2000)	Stipulations	Times
1	Lana Star defeated Patti Pep	Singles match	3:07
2	Riot defeated Beckie the Farmers Daughter (with the company of her Father)	Singles match	5:20
3	Ice Cold defeated Boom Boom the Volcano	Singles match	4:03
4	Poison defeated Randi Rah Rah	Singles match	5:31
Match No.	Episode 3 (taped on September 1, 2000, aired on October 20, 2000)	Stipulations	Times
1	The Phantom defeated Wendi Wheels by submission	Singles match	6:36
2	Terri Gold (c) defeated Jungle Grrrl	Singles match for the WOW World Championship	4:49
3	Slam Dunk defeated Jane Blond	Singles match	4:23
4	Danger defeated Tanja the Warrior Woman	Singles match	3:16
5	Beckie the Farmers Daughter (with the company of her Father) and Bronco Billie defeated Harley's Angels (Charlie Davidson and EZ Rider) (with Thug) by disqualification	Tag team match	5:56
Match No.	Episode 4 (taped on October 7, 2000, aired on October 27, 2000)	Stipulations	Times
1	Patti Pep defeated Poison (with Lana Star)	Singles match	2:37
2	Riot defeated Caliente	Singles match	4:37
3	Jacklyn Hyde (with the company of Nurse Mercy) defeated Boom Boom the Volcano	Singles match	3:15
4	Ice Cold defeated Hammerin' Heather Steele	Singles match	3:24
5	Wendi Wheels defeated Danger by disqualification	Singles match	3:46
6	Terri Gold (c) defeated The Disciplinarian	Singles match for the WOW World Championship	3:01
Match No.	Episode 5 (taped on October 7, 2000, aired on November 3, 2000)	Stipulations	Times
1	Jungle Grrrl defeated Jade	Singles match	2:53
2	Slam Dunk defeated Tanja the Warrior Woman	Singles match	3:26
3	Roxy Powers defeated Jane Blond	Singles match	3:22
4	Riot defeated Lotus	Singles match	3:01
5	The Disciplinarian defeated Patti Pep	Singles match	3:13
6	Beckie the Farmers Daughter, Bronco Billie and Terri Gold defeated Harley's Angels (Charlie Davidson, EZ Rider and Thug)	Six-woman tag team match	5:36
Match No.	Episode 6 (taped on October 7, 2000, aired on November 10, 2000)	Stipulations	Times
1	The Phantom defeated Summer by submission	Singles match	5:42
2	Jade defeated Riot by disqualification	Singles match	4:43
3	Beckie the Farmers Daughter defeated Mystery	Singles match	3:33
4	Caged Heat (Delta Lotta Pain and Loca) defeated Farah the Persian Princess and Paradise	Tag team match	3:33
Match No.	Episode 7 (taped on October 7, 2000, aired on November 17, 2000)	Stipulations	Times
1	Slam Dunk defeated Summer	Singles match	2:55
2	Jungle Grrrl defeated Bronco Billie	Singles match	2:32
3	The Disciplinarian defeated Hammerin' Heather Steele	Singles match	2:54
4	Beckie the Farmers Daughter defeated Thug (with Charlie Davidson and EZ Rider)	Singles match	4:48
Match No.	Episode 8 (taped on November 4, 2000, aired on November 24, 2000)	Stipulations	Times
1	Poison defeated Lana Star by disqualification	Singles match	2:50
2	Ice Cold vs. Wendi Wheels ended in a double count out	Singles match	5:29
3	Caged Heat (Delta Lotta Pain and Loca) defeated The Asian Invasion (Jade and Lotus)	Tag team tournament quarterfinals match for the WOW World Tag Team Championship	3:44
4	Mystery (with the Big Goon) defeated Hammerin' Heather Steele	Singles match	2:43
5	Selina Majors defeated EZ Rider (with Charlie Davidson and Thug)	Singles match	4:32
Match No.	Episode 9 (taped on November 4, 2000, aired on December 1, 2000)	Stipulations	Times
1	Ice Cold and Poison defeated Farah the Persian Princess and Paradise	Tag team tournament quarterfinals match for the WOW World Tag Team Championship	3:28
2	Caliente defeated Jacklyn Hyde (with Dr. Sarah Bellum) by submission	Singles match	3:50
3	Selina Majors defeated Charlie Davidson (with EZ Rider and Thug)	Singles match	3:34
4	Lana Star and Patti Pizzazz defeated Roxy Powers and Tanja the Warrior Woman	Tag team tournament quarterfinals match for the WOW World Tag Team Championship	3:20
5	Terri Gold (c) defeated Mystery (with the Big Goon)	Singles match for the WOW World Championship	4:10
Match No.	Episode 10 (taped on November 4, 2000, aired on December 8, 2000)	Stipulations	Times
1	Wendi Wheels defeated Riot by disqualification	Singles match	4:36
2	The Disciplinarian defeated Jade	Singles match	3:01
3	Jungle Grrrl defeated Farah the Persian Princess	Singles match	3:11
4	Lana Star and Patti Pizzazz defeated Ice Cold and Poison	Tag team tournament semifinals match for the WOW World Tag Team Championship	4:01
5	Jane Blond vs. Boom Boom the Volcano no contest	Singles match	5:22
Match No.	Episode 11 (taped on November 17, 2000, aired on December 15, 2000)	Stipulations	Times
1	Slam Dunk defeated The Asian Invasion (Jade and Lotus)	Handicap match	4:05
2	Jane Blond defeated Caliente	Singles match	3:20
3	Wendi Wheels defeated Mystery (with Misery and the Big Goon) by disqualification	Singles match	5:05
4	Beckie the Farmers Daughter and Bronco Billie defeated Danger and Riot	Tag team tournament quarterfinals match for the WOW World Tag Team Championship	6:48
Match No.	Episode 12 (taped on November 17, 2000, aired on December 22, 2000)	Stipulations	Times
1	Slam Dunk defeated Sandy	Singles match	3:10
2	Riot defeated Bronco Billie	Singles match	3:56
3	Selina Majors defeated Thug	Singles match for the Falls Count Anywhere match	10:01
Episode 13 (taped on December 23, 2000, aired on December 29, 2000) Year in Review Show
Match No.	Episode 14 (taped on December 15, 2000, aired on January 5, 2001)	Stipulations	Times
1	Beckie the Farmers Daughter defeated Jacklyn Hyde (with Dr. Sarah Bellum and Nurse Mercy)	Singles match	4:09
2	The Beach Patrol (Sandy and Summer) defeated The Daughters Of Darkness (Misery and Mystery) (with the Big Goon)	Tag team tournament quarterfinals match for the WOW World Tag Team Championship	6:43
3	Terri Gold (c) defeated Poison	Singles match for the WOW World Championship	3:12
4	Caged Heat (Delta Lotta Pain and Loca) defeated Roxy Powers and Tanja the Warrior Woman	Tag team match	3:50
Match No.	Episode 15 (taped on December 15, 2000, aired on January 12, 2001)	Stipulations	Times
1	Jungle Grrrl defeated Paradise	Singles match	2:13
2	Harley's Angels (Charlie Davidson and EZ Rider) (with Thug) defeated Boom Boom the Volcano and Caliente	Tag team tournament quarterfinals match for the WOW World Tag Team Championship	5:05
3	Terri Gold (c) defeated Ice Cold	Singles match for the WOW World Championship	3:57
4	Selina Majors (with Beckie the Farmers Daughter, Bronco Billie, Farah the Persian Princess, Hammerin' Heather Steele, Jane Blond, Paradise, Roxy Powers, Tanja the Warrior Woman and Wendi Wheels) vs. Thug (with Charlie Davidson, EZ Rider, Ice Cold and Jungle Grrrl) ended in a no contest	Lumberjack match	9:06
Match No.	Episode 16 (taped on December 15, 2000, aired on January 19, 2001)	Stipulations	Times
1	Wendi Wheels defeated Tanja the Warrior Woman	Singles match	2:55
2	Slam Dunk defeated Boom Boom the Volcano	Singles match	3:15
3	Caged Heat (Delta Lotta Pain and Loca) defeated Beckie the Farmers Daughter (with her Father) and Bronco Billie	Tag team tournament semifinals match for the WOW World Tag Team Championship	4:05
4	Terri Gold (c) vs. Riot no contest Danger defeated Terri Gold (c)	Singles match for the WOW World Championship	3:27
Match No.	Episode 17 (taped on December 15, 2000, aired on January 26, 2001)	Stipulations	Times
1	Roxy Powers defeated Lana Star by disqualification	Singles match	0:42
2	Jungle Grrrl defeated Lotus	Singles match	3:22
3	Riot defeated Jane Blond	Singles match	6:29
4	Harley's Angels (Charlie Davidson and EZ Rider) (with Thug) defeated The Beach Patrol (Sandy and Summer)	Tag team tournament semifinals match for the WOW World Tag Team Championship	4:34
Match No.	Episode 18 WOW Unleashed (aired on February 4, 2001)	Stipulations	Times
1	Randi Rah Rah defeated Jacklyn Hyde	Singles match	2:15
2	The Beach Patrol (Sandy and Summer) vs. Farah the Persian Princess and Paradise ended in a draw	Tag team match	2:30
3	Tanja the Warrior Woman defeated Jane Blond	Singles match	2:47
4	Nicky Law (with Kristy Order) defeated Hammerin' Heather Steele	Singles match	2:02
5	Boom Boom the Volcano and Caliente defeated The Asian Invasion (Jade and Lotus)	Tag team match	4:43
6	Bronco Billie defeated The Disciplinarian	Singles match	3:55
7	Roxy Powers vs. Slam Dunk ended in a double disqualification	Singles match	6:16
8	Riot defeated Wendi Wheels	Hardcore match	9:40
9	Jungle Grrrl defeated Beckie the Farmers Daughter	Splash match	9:45
10	Caged Heat (Delta Lotta Pain and Loca) defeated Harley's Angels (Charlie Davidson and EZ Rider) (with Thug)	Tag team tournament final match for the inaugural WOW World Tag Team Championship	5:42
11	Terri Gold defeated Danger (c)	Singles rematch for the WOW World Championship	4:20
12	Lana Star and Patti Pizzazz vs. Ice Cold and Poison no contest Lana Star defeated Ice Cold and Poison	Handicap hair vs. hair match (Since Ice Cold was pinned, she had her head shaved)	5:16
13	Thug (with Charlie Davidson and EZ Rider) defeated Selina Majors	Steel cage match	15:01
Match No.	Episode 19 (taped on January 20, 2001, aired on February 9, 2001)	Stipulations	Times
1	Poison defeated Jade	Singles match	5:05
2	Caliente defeated The Disciplinarian by submission	Singles match	3:48
3	Hammerin' Heather Steele defeated Jacklyn Hyde (with Nurse Mercy)	Singles match	2:48
4	Slam Dunk defeated Roxy Powers	Singles match	5:41
Match No.	Episode 20 (taped on January 20, 2001, aired on February 16, 2001)	Stipulations	Times
1	Randi Rah Rah defeated Lana Star	Singles match	4:47
2	Jungle Grrrl defeated Jane Blond	Singles match	4:26
3	Riot defeated Sandy	Singles Match	5:06
4	Caged Heat (Delta Lotta Pain and Loca) (c) defeated The Daughters Of Darkness (Misery and Mystery) (with the Big Goon)	Tag team match for the WOW World Tag Team Championship	4:33
Match No.	Episode 21 (taped on January 20, 2001, aired on February 23, 2001)	Stipulations	Times
1	Poison defeated Hammerin' Heather Steele	Singles match	3:21
2	Harley's Angels (Charlie Davidson and EZ Rider) (with Thug) defeated The Asian Invasion (Jade and Lotus)	Tag team match	4:38
3	Roxy Powers defeated Slam Dunk	Singles match for the Strap match	5:54
4	Caged Heat (Delta Lotta Pain and Loca) (c) defeated Boom Boom the Volcano and Caliente	Tag team match for the WOW World Tag Team Championship	4:42
5	Terri Gold (c) vs. Thug ended in a no contest	Singles match for the WOW World Championship	7:28
Match No.	Episode 22 (taped on January 20, 2001, aired on March 2, 2001)	Stipulations	Times
1	Wendi Wheels defeated Summer	Singles match	3:36
2	Beckie the Farmers Daughter defeated The Disciplinarian	Singles match	3:52
3	Jungle Grrrl defeated Hammerin' Heather Steele	Singles match	3:12
4	Farah the Persian Princess and Paradise defeated The Asian Invasion (Jade and Lotus)	Tag team match	4:08
5	Jacklyn Hyde (with Dr. Sarah Bellum) defeated Patti Pizzazz	Singles match	2:46
6	Thug (with Charlie Davidson and EZ Rider) defeated Bronco Billie	Singles match	2:30

== WOW Season 2-4 (2013/2016-2017) ==
=== Superheroes Roster ===
The only official rosters that returned to the promotion was Delta Lotta Pain, Jade, Jungle Grrrl, Lana Star, Loca, Paradise, Riot, Selina Majors and Thug.

Ring name	Real name	Notes
Abilene Maverick The Governor's Daughter	Callee Wilkerson	Season 3: Episode 13 Season 4: Episode 2, 8
Azúcar	Vanessa Herrera	Season 2: Episode 2
The Beverly Hills Babe	Kimberly Dawn Davis	Season 2: Episode 6 Season 4: Tag 5 Season 4: Episode 9, 10 Formerly known as Amber O'Neal
Buggy Nova		Season 4: Tag 2
Candice LeRae	Candice Dawson	
Christina Von Eerie		Season 4: Tag 1
The Dagger	Michelle Blanchard	Season 4: Episode 5 Season 4 Tag 5 Formerly known as Dagger The Widow
Delta Lotta Pain	Jwaundace Candece	
Desdemeana The Soldier Of Darkness	Andrea VanEpps	Season 2: Episode 6
Fire	Taylor Lewis	Season 3: Episode 11
Frenchie	Marie Gibeault	Season 3: Episode 12
Frost The Olympian	Janeshia Adams-Ginyard	Season 2: Episode 2 Season 3: Episode 4, 12
Holidead	Camille Ligon	Season 4: Tag 1, 2, 3 Season 4: Episode 5
Ivy Quinn	Season 4: Tag 3	
Jade	Jennifer Lee Chan	Season 2: Episode 6 Season 3: Episode 1
Jessie Jones	Jessie Belle McCoy	Season 4: Tag 5 Season 4: Episode 4
Jungle Grrrl	Erica Porter	Season 2: Episode 6, 10 Season 3: Episode 7, 14 Season 4: Tag 5 Season 4: Episode 1, 9, 10 Former WOW World Champion
Keta Rush	Keta Meggett	Season 4: Tag 4 Season 4: Episode 6
Katarina Waters	Katarina Leigh Waters	Season 4: Tag 4, 5
Kharma		Season 4: Tag 4
Khloe Hurtz	Katie Forbes	Season 4: Tag 2, 4 Season 4: Episode 1, 8
Kiara Dillon		Season 4: Tag 2, 3, 4
La Niña	Melissa Santos	
Lady London	Georgina Rawlings	
Lana Star	Lana Kinnear	Season 2: Episode 3, 9 Season 3: Episode 9, 10, 14 Former WOW World Champion
Loca	Cher Ferreyra	Season 4: Tag 3
Malia Hosaka	Malia Hosaka	Season 4: Tag 4, 5
Paradise	Maria Nunez	
Ray Lyn		Season 4: Tag 4
Razor	Christina Von Eerie	Season 4: Episode 4
Santana Garrett	Santana Garrett	Season 2: Episode 4 Season 4: Episode 9, 10 WOW World Champion
Selina Majors	Selina Majors	Season 4: Tag 1, 2 Season 4: Episode 4
Siren The Voodoo Doll	Nina Monet	Season 4: Tag 3
Spike	Hudson Envy	Season 4: Tag 1, 2 Season 4: Episode 4
Stephy Slays	Stephanie Mason	Season 4: Tag 3, 4 Season 4: Episode 2, 6 Formerly known as Stephanie La Maravillosa
Sunshine	Jamila Griffith	Season 2: Episode 3 Season 3: Episode 3
Tatevik The Gamer	Tatevik Hunanyan	Season 2: Episode 4, 10 Season 3: Episode 4, 7
Thug	Peggy Lee Leather	Season 2: Episode 8 Season 3: Episode 1, 11

=== Tag Team Roster ===
The only official tag teams that returned to the promotion was Caged Heat.

Ring names	Team names	Notes
Abilene Maverick The Governor's Daughter Candice LeRae		Season 3: Episode 5
Delta Lotta Pain Loca	Caged Heat	Season 2: Episode 5, 11 Season 3: Episode 2, 8 Season 4: Episode 3 Former WOW World Tag Team Champions
Ivy Quinn Ray Lyn		Season 4: Tag 5
Jessie Jones Selina Majors	Southern Pride	Season 4: Episode 7
Keta Rush Stephy Slays	The Bully Busters	Season 3: Episode 6 Season 4: Tag 5
La Niña Paradise	Tropical Storm	Season 3: Episode 6
Razor Spike		Season 4: Episode 7

The former teams

Ring names	Team names	Notes
Amber O'Neal Santana Garrett	The All American Girls	Season 2: Episode 11 Season 3: Episode 2, 5, 8 Season 4: Episode 3 Former WOW World Tag Team Champions

=== Other on-air Personnel Roster ===
The original WOW Superhero is only Riot.

Ring name	Real name	Notes
Kitty	Holly Meowy	A personal assistant of Lana Star
Riot	April Littlejohn	Manager of Razor and Spike
Sophia López	Leslie Garza	Manager of Caged Heat (Delta Lotta Pain and Loca)

=== List of episodes (season 2/2013) ===
Episode were air on the promotion's website and YouTube channel.

Below are the results of the matches aired on the WOW website and the approximate dates they aired.

Episode 1: The New Generation (taped on January 19, 2013, aired on February 22, 2016)
Interview with the new generations
Match No.	Episode 2: Cold War (taped on January 19, 2013, aired on March 1, 2016)	Stipulations	Times
1	Azucar defeated Frost the Olympian by disqualification	Singles match	7:59
Match No.	Episode 3: Solar Eclipse (taped on January 19, 2013, aired on March 8, 2016)	Stipulations	Times
1	Lana Star (c) (with her personal assistant Kitty) defeated Sunshine	Singles match for the WOW World Championship	1:52
Match No.	Episode 4: High Expectations (taped on January 19, 2013, aired on March 18, 2016)	Stipulations	Times
1	Tatevik the Gamer defeated Santana Garrett	Singles match	5:54
Match No.	Episode 5: Jailyard Brawl (taped on January 19, 2013, aired on March 24, 2016)	Stipulations	Times
1	Caged Heat (Delta Lotta Pain and Loca) (c) (with the Atty. Sophia Lopez) defeated The Bully Busters (Keta Rush and Stephanie LaMaravillosa)	Tag team match for the WOW World Tag Team Championship	6:23
Match No.	Episode 6: Homecoming (taped on January 19, 2013, aired on April 8, 2016)	Stipulations	Times
1	Jade defeated Desdemeana the Soldier Of Darkness	Singles match	6:45
Match No.	Episode 7: Battle of Queens (taped on January 19, 2013, aired on April 15, 2016)	Stipulations	Times
1	Jungle Grrrl defeated Amber O'Neal	Singles match	5:23
Episode 8: Award Show Shocker (taped on January 19, 2013, aired on April 15, 2016)
Thug being awarded with the Princess Jasmine Trailblazer Award
Match No.	Episode 9: Winning the Lotto (taped on January 19, 2013, aired on April 22, 2016)	Stipulations	Times
1	Lana Star (c) (with her personal assistant Kitty) defeated Spike (with Thug) by disqualification	Singles match for the WOW World Championship	8:44
Match No.	Episode 10: Leaps vs. Kicks (taped on January 19, 2013, aired on April 29, 2016)	Stipulations	Times
1	Jungle Grrrl vs. Tatevik the Gamer ended in a no contest	Singles match	9:49
Match No.	Episode 11: Rule the Roost (taped on January 19, 2013, aired on May 6, 2016)	Stipulations	Times
1	The All American Girls (Amber O'Neal and Santana Garrett) defeated Caged Heat (Delta Lotta Pain and Loca) (c) (with the Atty. Sophia Lopez)	Tag team match for the WOW World Tag Team Championship	7:13

=== List of episodes (season 3/2013) ===
The series is streaming online on wowe.com website and YouTube.

Below are the results of the matches aired on the WOW website and the approximate dates they aired.

Match No.	Episode 1: Redemption (taped on March 9, 2013, aired on June 3, 2016)	Stipulations	Times
1	Jade defeated Thug by disqualification	Singles match	2:19
Episode 2: 9/10 of the Law (taped on March 9, 2013, aired on June 10, 2016)
Interview with the Atty. Sophia Lopez and Caged Heat (Delta Lotta Pain and Loca) against The All American Girls (Amber O'Neal and Santana Garrett) (c)
Match No.	Episode 3: Second Chances (taped on March 9, 2013, aired on June 17, 2016)	Stipulations	Times
1	Spike (with Thug) defeated Sunshine	Singles match	4:43
Match No.	Episode 4: Level Up (taped on March 9, 2013, aired on June 24, 2016)	Stipulations	Times
1	Frost the Olympian vs. Tatevik the Gamer ended in a double countout	Singles match to determine the #1 contender for the WOW World Championship	7:31
Match No.	Episode 5: Indie Battle (taped on March 9, 2013, aired on July 1, 2016)	Stipulations	Times
1	The All American Girls (Amber O'Neal and Santana Garrett) (c) defeated Abilene Maverick the Governor's Daughter and Candice LeRae	Tag team match for the WOW World Tag Team Championship	6:28
Match No.	Episode 6: Hurricane Match (taped on March 9, 2013, aired on July 8, 2016)	Stipulations	Times
1	Tropical Storm (La Niña and Paradise) defeated The Bully Busters (Keta Rush and Stephanie La Maravillosa)	Tag team match	5:08
Match No.	Episode 7: Rival's Rematch (taped on March 9, 2013, aired on July 15, 2016)	Stipulations	Times
1	Jungle Grrrl defeated Tatevik the Gamer	Singles match to determine the #1 contender for the WOW World Championship	6:44
Match No.	Episode 8: Titles on Trial (taped on March 9, 2013, aired on July 22, 2016)	Stipulations	Times
1	The All American Girls (Amber O'Neal and Santana Garrett) (c) defeated (Delta Lotta Pain and Loca) (with the Atty. Sophia Lopez) by disqualification	Tag team match for the WOW World Tag Team Championship	6:07
Episode 9: Spike's Saga (taped on March 9, 2013, aired on July 29, 2016)
In-ring promo that involved Lana Star (c) (with her personal assistant Kitty) vs. Spike (with Thug) for the WOW World Championship title match.
Match No.	Episode 10: The X Factor (taped on March 9, 2013, aired on August 5, 2016)	Stipulations	Times
1	Lana Star (c) (with her personal assistant Kitty) defeated Spike (with Thug)	Singles match for the WOW World Championship	5:56
Episode 11: Family Feuds (taped on March 9, 2013, aired on August 12, 2016)
In-ring promo that involved Fire, Jessie Jones, Selina Majors, Spike and Thug
Episode 12: No Chill (taped on March 9, 2013, aired on August 12, 2016)
Backstage segment where Frost the Olympian attacked Frenchie (postponed match)
Match No.	Episode 13: Real Wrasslin' (taped on March 9, 2013, aired on August 19, 2016)	Stipulations	Times
1	Jessie Jones (with Selina Majors) defeated Abilene Maverick the Governor's Daughter	Singles match	8:27
Match No.	Episode 14: Dangerous Game (taped on March 9, 2013, aired on August 26, 2016)	Stipulations	Times
1	Jungle Grrrl defeated Lana Star (c) (with her personal assistant Kitty)	Singles match for the WOW World Championship	5:59

=== List of episodes (season 4/2016) ===
The series is streaming online on wowe.com website and YouTube.

Below are the results of the matches aired on the WOW website and the approximate dates they aired.

Match No.	Episode 1: A Date with Destiny (taped September 29, 2016, aired on February 28, 2017)	Stipulations	Times
1	Jungle Grrrl defeated Khloe Hurtz (with the Company of her Ring Rats)	Singles match for the WOW World Championship	5:48
Match No.	Episode 2: A Not My Cup Of Tea (taped September 29, 2016, aired on March 7, 2017)	Stipulations	Times
1	Abilene Maverick the Governor's Daughter defeated Stephy Slays	Singles match	5:26
Match No.	Episode 3: Out for Justice (taped September 29, 2016, aired on March 14, 2017)	Stipulations	Times
1	Caged Heat (Delta Lotta Pain and Loca) (with the Atty. Sophia Lopez) defeated The All American Girls (Amber O'Neal and Santana Garrett)	Tag team tournament quarterfinals match for the WOW World Tag Team Championship	8:02
Episode 4: State of Emergency (taped September 29, 2016, aired on March 21, 2017)
The WOW's original Riot made her return as the manager of Razor and Spike, who attacked Santana Garrett. After the attack, Garret was medically escorted
Match No.	Episode 5: Rise from the Dead (taped September 29, 2016, aired on March 28, 2017)	Stipulations	Times
1	Holidead defeated The Dagger	Singles match	6:05
Match No.	Episode 6: Friends or Foes? (taped September 29, 2016, aired on April 4, 2017)	Stipulations	Times
1	Keta Rush defeated Stephy Slays by submission	Singles match	6:26
Match No.	Episode 7: A Matter of Respect (taped September 29, 2016, aired on April 11, 2017)	Stipulations	Times
1	Southern Pride (Jessie Jones and Selina Majors) defeated Razor and Spike (with Riot)	Tag team match	
Match No.	Episode 8: Hung Me Out to Dry! (taped September 29, 2016, aired on April 18, 2017)	Stipulations	Times
1	Khloe Hurtz (with the Company of her Ring Rats) defeated Abilene Maverick the Governor's Daughter	Singles match	6:59
Episode 9: Depths Of Desire (taped September 29, 2016, aired on April 25, 2017)
Jungle Grrrl was booked the defend her WOW World Championship against The Beverly Hills Babe (who was accompanied by Lana Star). However, Santana Garrett made her return and demanded a match for the championship as the rightful #1 contender.
Match No.	Episode 10: Winner Takes All (taped September 29, 2016, aired on May 1, 2017)	Stipulations	Times
1	Santana Garrett defeated The Beverly Hills Babe (with Lana Star) and Jungle Grrrl (c)	Triple threat match for the WOW World Championship	7:37

=== List of episodes (WOW Friday Night Fights Event/2016-2017) ===
The series is streaming online on wowe.com website.

Below are the results of the matches aired on the WOW website and the approximate dates they aired.

Match No.	Tag 1: WOW Friday Night Fights Event (aired on September 4, 2016)	Stipulations	Times
1	Holidead defeated Christina Von Eerie	Singles match	9:17
2	Selina Majors vs. Spike (with Christina Von Eerie) ended in a no contest	Singles match	9:00
Match No.	Tag 2: WOW Friday Night Fights Event (aired on September 16, 2016)	Stipulations	Times
1	Kiara Dillon defeated Buggy Nova	Singles match	
2	Khloe Hurtz defeated Holidead	Singles match to determine the #1 contender for the WOW World Championship	
3	Selina Majors defeated Spike	Singles match	7:55
Match No.	Tag 3: WOW Friday Night Fights Event (aired on November 14, 2016)	Stipulations	Times
1	Kiara Dillon defeated Siren the Voodoo Doll	Singles match	
2	Holidead defeated Ivy Quinn	Singles match	
3	Stephy Slays defeated Loca	Singles match	
Match No.	Tag 4: WOW Friday Night Fights Event (aired on November 18, 2016)	Stipulations	Times
1	Malia Hosaka defeated Ray Lyn	Singles match	
2	Kiara Dillon defeated Kharma	Singles match	
3	Stephy Slays defeated Keta Rush	Singles match	
4	Khloe Hurtz defeated Katarina Waters	Singles match to determine the #1 contender for the WOW World Championship	
Match No.	Tag 5: WOW Friday Night Fights Event (aired on January 27, 2017)	Stipulations	Times
1	Dagger the Widow defeated Katarina Waters	Singles match	
2	Malia Hosaka defeated Jessie Jones	Singles match	
3	The Bully Busters (Keta Rush and Stephy Slays) defeated Ivy Quinn and Ray Lyn	Tag team match	
4	Jungle Grrrl defeated The Beverly Hills Babe (with Lana Star)	Singles match to determine the #1 contender for the WOW World Championship	

=== List of episodes (WOW Live Event/2017) ===
The series is streaming online on wowe.com website.

Below are the results of the matches aired on the WOW website and the approximate dates they aired.

Match No.	Event: WOW Live Event (aired on May 11, 2017)	Stipulations	Times
1	The Beast defeated Stephy Slays	Singles match	
2	Santana Garrett (c) defeated Abilene Maverick the Governor's Daughter	Singles match for the WOW World Championship	
3	Jessie Jones defeated Malia Hosaka	Singles match	
4	Caged Heat (Delta Lotta Pain and Loca) defeated The Bully Busters (Keta Rush and Stephy Slays)	Tag team tournament quarterfinals match for the WOW World Tag Team Championship	
5	Abilene Maverick the Governor's Daughter defeated Khloe Hurtz	Singles match	
6	Malia Hosaka defeated Chantilly Chella	Singles match	
7	The Temptress (with The Dagger) defeated Jessie Jones	Singles match	
8	Santana Garrett (c) defeated The Beverly Hills Babe	Singles match for the WOW World Championship	

== WOW Season 5–7 (2018–2019) ==
=== Superheroes roster ===
The only official rosters that returned to the promotion was Abilene Maverick the Governor's Daughter, Amber O'Neal, The Dagger, Holidead, Jessie Jones, Jungle Grrrl, Keta Rush, Khloe Hurtz, Lana Star, Santana Garrett and Stephy Slays formerly known as Stephanie LaMaravillosa.

Ring name	Real name	Notes
Abilene Maverick The Governor's Daughter	Callee Wilkerson	Season 5: Episode 1, 3 Season 6: Episode 2, 12
Adrenaline	Priscilla Zuniga	Season 6: Episode 2
Adriana Gambino	Valentina Rossi	Season 7: Episode 11
Amber O’Neal	Kimberly Dawn Davis	Season 5: Episode 2, 4, 7 Season 6: Episode 2 Formerly known as The Beverly Hills Babe
The Beast	Twana Barnett Ferguson	Season 5: Episode 1, 3, 6 Season 5: LA Comic Con 1 Season 6: Episode 1, 4, 6, 7, 9, 12 Season 7: Episode 2, 4, 5, 8, 12 Season 7: LA Comic Con 1 WOW World Champion
Brittany Bay		
Cali Ray	Kirsten Young	Season 7: Episode 5, 6, 9
Casey Dakota	Sarah Stallman	Season 7: Episode 7
Chainsaw	Reyna Meree Velarde	Season 7: Episode 12
Chantilly Chella	Rachel Kelvington Bostic	Season 5: Episode 3, 5, 7 Season 6: Episode 4, 8 Season 7: Episode 3, 6, 8
The Dagger	Michelle Blanchard	Season 5: Episode 6 Season 7: Episode 5
The Disciplinarian	Robyn Reid	Season 5: Episode 3, 5 Season 6: Episode 1, 5, 11 Season 7: Episode 2, 4, 6
Eye Candy	Willow Nightingale	Season 5: Episode 1, 4, 7
Exodus	Karen Tran	
Faith The Lioness	Faith Jefferies	Season 5: Episode 3, 5 Season 5: LA Comic Con 1 Season 6: Episode 2, 8, 9, 10 Season 7: Episode 1, 10 Season 7: LA Comic Con 1
Fire	Kiera Hogan	Season 5: Episode 1, 3, 5, 7 Season 5: LA Comic Con 1 Season 6: Episode 1, 4, 7
Fury	Harlow O’Hara	Season 5: Episode 3 Season 6: Episode 4, 6 Season 7: Episode 6, 9
Genesis	Selena O'Sullivan	
Hazard	Elizabeth Crist	
Holidead	Camille Ligon	Season 5: Episode 4, 6, 12 Season 7: Episode 7, 10
Jessicka Havok	Jessica Cricks	Season 5: Episode 5, 7 Season 5: LA Comic Con 1 Season 6: Episode 1
Jessie Jones	Jessie Belle McCoy	Season 5: Episode 2, 4, 7 Season 6: Episode 1 Season 7: Episode 7
Jolene Dixie	Airial Le	Season 7: Episode 2
Jolynn Dixie	Cathy Le	
Jungle Grrrl	Erica Porter	Season 5: Episode 1, 4, 5, 7 Season 6: Episode 1, 4, 5, 7, 9 Season 7: Episode 1, 3 Former WOW World Champion
Keta Rush	Keta Meggett	Season 5: Episode 6
Khloe Hurtz	Katie Forbes	Season 5: Episode 1, 3 Season 6: Episode 8, 10
Krissy Vaine	Kristin Eubanks	Season 7: Episode 3
Malia Hosaka	Malia Hosaka	Season 7: Episode 7, 8, 9
Mezmeriah	Arelys Rodriguez Silva	Season 7: Episode 4,
Nikki Krampus	Ragnhild Bjoerge	Season 5: Episode 6 Season 6: Episode 3, 6
Princess Aussie	Simone Sherie Williams	Season 5: Episode 2, 6 Season 6: Episode 3, 6, 9, 12 Season 7: Episode 2
Razor	Sarah Wolfe	Season 5: Episode 5 Season 7: Episode 7
Reyna Reyes	Gisele Shaw	Season 5: Episode 2, 4, 6, 7 Season 6: Episode 3, 5, 7, 11 Season 7: Episode 1, 2, 4, 6 Formerly known as Azteca
Santana Garrett	Santana Garrett	Season 5: Episode 1, 4 Former WOW World Champion
The Sassy Massy	Alisha Edwards	Season 6: Episode 1, 5, 8 Season 7: Episode 3, 6
Serpentine	Melissa Cervantes	Season 5: Episode 7 Season 6: Episode 2, 7, 9 Season 7: Episode 1, 2, 4, 6, 10, 11 Formerly known as Kobra Moon
Siren The Voodoo Doll	Nina Monet	Season 5: Episode 2 Season 6: Episode 4 Season 7: Episode 9
Spike	Ashley Martinez	Season 7: Episode 10
Stephy Slays	Stephanie Mason	Season 5: Episode 1, 4, 6 Season 6: Episode 5, 12 Season 7: Episode 4, 8, 11, 12
The Temptress	Katarina Leigh Waters	Season 5: Episode 7 Season 6: Episode 3, 8 Season 7: Episode 5, 8, 10
Tessa Blanchard	Tessa Blanchard	Season 5: Episode 2, 4, 5 Season 6: Episode 2, 5, 8, 9, 12 Season 7: Episode 1, 3, 6, 7, 10, 12 Former WOW World Champion
Venomous	Ruby Raze	Season 7: Episode 3, 5, 7, 8, 11

=== Tag Team Roster ===
The only official tag teams that returned to the promotion was The Bully Busters.

Ring names	Team names	Notes
Adrenaline Fire		Season 6: Episode 6, 8, 10, 11 Season 7: Episode 1, 5, 9, 11 WOW World Tag Team Champions
Amber O'Neal Krissy Vaine	Team Blondage	Season 7: Episode 9, 12
Chantilly Chella The Sassy Massy		Season 6: Episode 3, 9 Season 7: Episode 1, 9, 11
The Dagger The Temptress	The Vengeful Vixens	Season 6: Episode 6
The Disciplinarian Samantha Smart		Season 7: Episode 11
Exodus Genesis	Exile	Season 7: Episode 2
Exodus Malia Hosaka	Exile	Season 7: Episode 10
Genesis Malia Hosaka	Exile	Season 7: Episode 3
Fury Mezmeriah Razor	The Psycho Sisters	Season 6: Episode 11 Season 7: Episode 4
Fury Razor	The Psycho Sisters	Season 6: Episode 1, 7 Season 7: Episode 1
Holidead Siren The Voodoo Doll		Season 5: Episode 8 Season 6: Episode 2, 7, 10
Jessicka Havok Hazard	Monsters of Madness	Season 6: Episode 3, 5, 7, 9, 10, 11
Jolene Dixie Jolynn Dixie	The Dixie Darlings	Season 6: Episode 5, 10 Season 7: Episode 5
Keta Rush Stephy Slays	The Bully Busters	Season 6: Episode 2, 7, 10 Season 7: Episode 2

The former teams

Ring names	Team names	Notes
Abilene Maverick The Governor's Daughter The Disciplinarian		Season 6: Episode 3, 10
Amber O’Neal Jessie Jones		Season 6: Episode 4, 6, 8, 10 Season 7: Episode 1, 3, 5
Faith The Lioness Lana Star		Season 6: Episode 4, 6
Princess Aussie Reyna Reyes		Season 5: Episode 8 Season 6: Episode 1

The unofficial or alliance teams

Ring names	Team names	Notes
Amber O’Neal Faith The Lioness		Season 7: Episode 8
The Beast Jungle Grrrl		Season 6: Episode 3
Cali Ray Stephy Slays		Season 7: Episode 10
Chantilly Chella Keta Rush The Sassy Massy		Season 6: Episode 11
Faith The Lioness Krissy Vaine		Season 7: Episode 5
Faith The Lioness Reyna Reyes		Season 7: Episode 12
Fury Mezmeriah Spike	The Psycho Sisters	Season 7: Episode 12
Holidead Princess Aussie Siren The Voodoo Doll		Season 7: Episode 4, 12
Jessie Jones Jolene Dixie		Season 7: Episode 9, 11
Krissy Vaine Lana Star		Season 7: Episode 8

=== Other on-air Personnel Roster ===
The original WOW Superhero is only the former WOW World Champion, Lana Star.

Ring name	Real name	Notes
Angelica Dante	Harley Hurpurr	Manager of Chainsaw
Lana Star	Lana Kinnear	Manager of the Team Blondage (Amber O'Neal and Krissy Vaine) Former protege, Faith the Lioness.
The Papua New Guinea Warrior	Tyrone Evans Clark, Arthur Moore, Kashif Uqdah and Ursa Gifted Major	Associated with Princess Aussie
Samantha Smart	Kirsten Garner	Manager of the Disciplinarian Former protege, Abilene Maverick the Governor's Daughter
Sophia López	Leslie Garza	Manager of Serpentine Former protege, Nikki Krampus
Teal Piper	Ariel Toombs	A field reporter

=== List of episodes (season 5/2018) ===
The series aired on AXS TV.

Below are the results of the matches aired on the WOW TV show and the approximate dates they aired.

Match No.	Episode 1: Making Her Mark (taped on October 11, 2018, aired on January 18, 2019)	Stipulations	Times
1	The Beast defeated Stephy Slays	Singles match	4:38
2	Abilene Maverick the Governor's Daughter defeated Fire	Singles Match	6:38
3	Eye Candy defeated Khloe Hurtz (with the company of her Ring Rats)	Singles Match	4:00
4	Jungle Grrrl defeated Santana Garrett (c) ended in a countout	Singles match for the WOW World Championship	3:38
Match No.	Episode 2: Born Legend (taped on October 11, 2018, aired on January 25, 2019)	Stipulations	Times
1	Princess Aussie (with the Papua New Guinea Warrior) defeated Siren the Voodoo Doll	Singles match	3:58
2	Jessie Jones defeated Azteca by submission	Singles match	6:14
3	Tessa Blanchard defeated The Beverly Hills Babe (with Lana Star)	Singles match	5:07
Match No.	Episode 3: Discipline (taped on October 11, 2018, aired on February 1, 2019)	Stipulations	Times
1	The Beast defeated Faith the Lioness	Singles match	4:30
2	Fire defeated The Disciplinarian (with Samantha Smart)	Singles match	7:13
3	Fury (with Razor) defeated Chantilly Chella	Singles match	6:50
4	Khloe Hurtz (with the company of her Ring Rats) defeated Abilene Maverick the Governor's Daughter	Singles rematch	8:14
Match No.	Episode 4: Triple Threat Main Event (taped on October 11, 2018, aired on February 8, 2019)	Stipulations	Times
1	The Beverly Hills Babe (with Lana Star) defeated Eye Candy	Singles match	3:31
2	Jessie Jones defeated Stephy Slays by submission	Singles match	5:01
3	Azteca defeated Holidead	Singles match	7:53
4	Jungle Grrrl and Santana Garrett (c) defeated Tessa Blanchard	Three-way match for the WOW World Championship	4:46
Match No.	Episode 5: The Resolution (taped on October 11, 2018, aired on February 15, 2019)	Stipulations	Times
1	Jessicka Havok defeated Fire	Singles match	4:50
2	The Disciplinarian (with Samantha Smart) defeated Chantilly Chella	Singles match	6:26
3	Faith the Lioness defeated Razor (with Fury)	Singles match	5:56
4	Tessa Blanchard defeated Jungle Grrrl	Singles match for the vacant WOW World Championship	7:27
Match No.	Episode 6: The Game Changer (taped on October 11, 2018, aired on February 22, 2019)	Stipulations	Times
1	Nikki Krumpus defeated Stephy Slays	Singles match	3:00
2	Princess Aussie (with the Papua New Guinea Warrior) defeated Holidead	Singles match	7:31
3	Keta Rush defeated The Dagger (with The Temptress) by submission	Singles match	4:47
4	The Beast defeated Azteca	Singles match	1:00
Match No.	Episode 7: Make Wrestling Great Again (taped on October 11, 2018, aired on March 1, 2019)	Stipulations	Times
1	Jessicka Havok defeated Eye Candy	Singles match	6:21
2	Jessie Jones defeated Chantilly Chella by submission	Singles match	2:34
3	Kobra Moon (with the Atty. Sophia Lopez) defeated Azteca	Singles match	6:22
4	The Temptress (with The Dagger) defeated Fire	Singles match	9:29
5	Jungle Grrrl defeated The Beverly Hills Babe (with Lana Star) by disqualification	Singles match	5:27
Match No.	Episode 8: Set Goals & Slay 'Em (taped on October 11, 2018, aired on March 8, 2019)	Stipulations	Times
1	Holidead and Siren the Voodoo Doll defeated Azteca and Princess Aussie (with the Papua New Guinea Warrior)	Tag team match	8:29
2	Stephy Slays defeated The Disciplinarian (with Samantha Smart)	Singles match	4:44
3	Kobra Moon (with the Atty. Sophia Lopez) defeated Khloe Hurtz (with the company of her Ring Rats)	Singles match	6:44
4	Tessa Blanchard (c) vs. Jessicka Havok ended in a no contest	Singles match for the WOW World Championship	3:55

=== List of episodes (WOW Live Event LA Comic Con/2018) ===
The series is streaming online on wowe.com website.

Below are the results of the matches aired on the WOW website and the approximate dates they aired.

Match No.	Event: WOW Live Event LA Comic Con (aired on October 27, 2018)	Stipulations	Times
1	The Beast defeated Faith the Lioness	Singles rematch	5:19
Match No.	Event: WOW Live Event LA Comic Con (aired on October 28, 2018)	Stipulations	Times
1	Jessicka Havok defeated Fire	Singles rematch	5:19

=== List of episodes (season 6/2019) ===
The series is taped aired on AXS TV and lately streaming aired on the social media account Facebook and YouTube channel.

Below are the results of the matches aired on the WOW TV show and the approximate dates they aired.

Match No.	Episode 1: Icon's And Legends (taped on May 16, 2019, aired on September 7, 2019)	Stipulations	Times
1	Jessie Jones defeated Fire by submission	Singles match	4:50
2	The Sassy Massy defeated The Disciplinarian (with Samantha Smart)	Singles match	4:35
3	The Psycho Sisters (Fury and Razor) (with Mezmeriah) defeated Princess Aussie (with the Papua New Guinea Warrior) and Reyna Reyes	Tag team tournament quarterfinals match for the WOW World Tag Team Championship	6:30
4	The Beast vs. Jessicka Havok vs. Jungle Grrrl ended in a no contest	Three-way elimination match to determine the #1 contender for the WOW World Championship	4:12
Match No.	Episode 2: The Lurking Serpent (taped on May 16, 2019, aired on September 14, 2019)	Stipulations	Times
1	Faith the Lioness defeated The Beverly Hills Babe (with Lana Star)	Singles match	3:32
2	Adrenaline defeated Abilene Maverick the Governor's Daughter	Singles match	5:36
3	Holidead and Siren the Voodoo Doll defeated The Bully Busters (Keta Rush and Stephy Slays)	Tag team tournament quarterfinals match for the WOW World Tag Team Championship	3:45
4	Tessa Blanchard (c) defeated Serpentine (with the Atty. Sophia Lopez)	Singles match for the WOW World Championship	13:14
Match No.	Episode 3: Welcome To The Jungle, Beast (taped on May 16, 2019, aired on September 28, 2019)	Stipulations	Times
1	Nikki Krampus (with the Atty. Sophia Lopez) defeated Princess Aussie (with the Papua New Guinea Warrior)	Singles match	3:41
2	Reyna Reyes defeated The Temptress (with The Dagger)	Singles match	7:17
3	Chantilly Chella and The Sassy Massy defeated Abilene Maverick the Governor's Daughter and The Disciplinarian (with Samantha Smart)	Tag team tournament quarterfinals match for the WOW World Tag Team Championship	8:13
4	The Beast and Jungle Grrrl defeated Monsters of Madness (Jessicka Havok and Hazard) by disqualification	Tag team match	3:39
Match No.	Episode 4: The Animals Are Unleashed! (taped on May 16, 2019, aired on October 5, 2019)	Stipulations	Times
1	Fire defeated Fury (with Mezmeriah and Razor)	Singles match	8:01
2	Siren the Voodoo Doll (with Holidead) defeated Chantilly Chella (with The Sassy Massy)	Singles match	5:29
3	Amber O'Neal and Jessie Jones defeated Faith the Lioness and Lana Star by submission	Tag team tournament quarterfinals match for the WOW World Tag Team Championship	4:20
4	The Beast defeated Jungle Grrrl	Singles match	7:07
Match No.	Episode 5: A Shot Of A Lifetime (taped on May 16, 2019, aired on October 12, 2019)	Stipulations	Times
1	Jungle Grrrl vs. The Sassy Massy ended in a no contest	Singles match	6:33
2	Abilene Maverick the Governor's Daughter vs. Stephy Slays no contest The Disciplinarian (with Samantha Smart) defeated Stephy Slays	Singles match	5:54
3	Monsters of Madness (Jessicka Havok and Hazard) defeated The Dixie Darlings (Jolene Dixie and Jolynn Dixie)	Tag team tournament quarterfinals match for the WOW World Tag Team Championship	3:37
4	Tessa Blanchard (c) defeated Reyna Reyes	Singles match for the WOW World Championship	7:17
Match No.	Episode 6: The Hunter Has Become The Hunted! (taped on May 16, 2019, aired on October 19, 2019)	Stipulations	Times
1	Amber O'Neal and Jessie Jones defeated Faith the Lioness and Lana Star	Tag team match	6:43
2	Fury (with Mezmeriah and Razor) defeated Princess Aussie (with the Papua New Guinea Warrior)	Singles match	8:47
3	Adrenaline and Fire defeated The Vengeful Vixens (The Dagger and The Temptress)	Tag team tournament quarterfinals match for the WOW World Tag Team Championship	9:36
4	The Beast defeated Nikki Krampus (with the Atty. Sophia Lopez)	Singles match	2:46
Match No.	Episode 7: Battle Of The Giants (taped on May 16, 2019, aired on October 26, 2019)	Stipulations	Times
1	Monsters of Madness (Jessicka Havok and Hazard) defeated The Bully Busters (Keta Rush and Stephy Slays)	Tag team match	5:38
2	Serpentine (with the Atty. Sophia Lopez) defeated Reyna Reyes	Singles rematch	9:40
3	Holidead and Siren the Voodoo Doll defeated The Psycho Sisters (Fury and Razor) (with Mezmeriah)	Tag team tournament semifinals match for the WOW World Tag Team Championship	9:21
4	Jungle Grrrl defeated The Beast by disqualification	Singles match to determine the #1 contender for the WOW World Championship	3:36
Match No.	Episode 8: Into the Lions Den (taped on May 16, 2019, aired on November 2, 2019)	Stipulations	Times
1	The Sassy Massy defeated Khloe Hurtz (with the company of her Ring Rats)	Singles match	4:34
2	Chantilly Chella defeated The Temptress (with The Dagger)	Singles match	6:43
3	Adrenaline and Fire defeated Amber O'Neal and Jessie Jones by submission	Tag team tournament semifinals match for the WOW World Tag Team Championship	8:18
4	Tessa Blanchard (c) defeated Faith the Lioness (with Lana Star)	Singles match for the WOW World Championship	7:05
Match No.	Episode 9: The Predator Is Hungry! (taped on May 16, 2019, aired on November 9, 2019)	Stipulations	Times
1	The Beast defeated Faith the Lioness (with Lana Star)	Singles rematch	0:45
2	Serpentine (with the Atty. Sophia Lopez) defeated Princess Aussie (with the Papua New Guinea Warrior)	Singles match	7:09
3	Monsters of Madness (Jessicka Havok and Hazard) defeated Chantilly Chella and The Sassy Massy	Tag team tournament semifinals match for the WOW World Tag Team Championship	5:31
4	Tessa Blanchard (c) defeated Jungle Grrrl	Singles match for the WOW World Championship	6:38
Match No.	Episode 10: Triple Threat Tag Team Match (taped on May 16, 2019, aired on November 16, 2019)	Stipulations	Times
1	The Bully Busters (Keta Rush and Stephy Slays) defeated Abilene Maverick the Governor's Daughter and The Disciplinarian (with Samantha Smart)	Tag team match	6:42
2	Amber O'Neal and Jessie Jones defeated The Dixie Darlings (Jolene Dixie and Jolynn Dixie) by submission	Tag team match	8:09
3	Faith the Lioness (with Lana Star) defeated Khloe Hurtz	Singles match	4:41
4	Monsters of Madness (Jessicka Havok and Hazard) defeated Adrenaline and Fire defeated Holidead and Siren the Voodoo Doll	Tag team tournament semifinals Three-way elimination match to determine for the finals of WOW World Tag Team Championship	7:54
Match No.	Episode 11: Hour Of Power (taped on May 16, 2019, aired on November 23, 2019)	Stipulations	Times
1	The Psycho Sisters (Razor, Fury, and Mezmeriah) defeated Chantilly Chella, Keta Rush and The Sassy Massy	Six-woman tag team match	6:13
2	Reyna Reyes defeated The Disciplinarian (with Samantha Smart)	Singles match	6:03
3	Adrenaline and Fire defeated Monsters of Madness (Jessicka Havok and Hazard)	Tag team tournament finals match for the WOW World Tag Team Championship	10:12
Match No.	Episode 12: Beast Versus Legend (taped on May 16, 2019, aired on November 23, 2019)	Stipulations	Times
1	Holidead (with Siren the Voodoo Doll) vs. Princess Aussie ended in a no contest	Singles rematch	8:42
2	Stephy Slays defeated Abilene Maverick the Governor's Daughter	Singles rematch	6:20
3	The Beast defeated Tessa Blanchard (c)	Singles match for the WOW World Championship	6:22

=== List of episodes (season 7/2019) ===
The series is taped aired on CW Seed and Pluto TV, lately streaming aired on the social media account Facebook and YouTube channel.

Below are the results of the matches aired on the WOW TV show and the approximate dates they aired.

Match No.	Episode 1 (taped on September 18, 2019, aired on January 22, 2022, re-aired on January 31, 2022)	Stipulations	Times
1	Adrenaline and Fire (c) defeated The Psycho Sisters (Fury and Razor) (with Mezmeriah) by disqualification	Tag team match	5:43
2	Amber O'Neal and Jessie Jones defeated Chantilly Chella and The Sassy Massy by submission	Tag team match	6:23
3	Reyna Reyes defeated Faith the Lioness (with Lana Star)	Singles match	5:13
4	Serpentine (with the Atty. Sophia Lopez) defeated Jungle Grrrl defeated Tessa Blanchard	Triple threat match to determine the #1 contender for the WOW World Championship	5:53
Match No.	Episode 2 (taped on September 18, 2019, aired on January 22, 2022, re-aired on February 7, 2022)	Stipulations	Times
1	The Bully Busters (Keta Rush and Stepy Slays) defeated Exile (Exodus and Genesis) (with Malia Hosaka) by disqualification	Tag team match	10:47
2	Jolene Dixie (with Jolynn Dixie) defeated The Disciplinarian (with Samantha Smart)	Singles match	5:40
3	Reyna Reyes defeated Princess Aussie	Singles match	5:47
4	The Beast (c) vs. Serpentine (with the Atty. Sophia Lopez) ended in a no contest	Singles match for the WOW World Championship	4:44
Match No.	Episode 3 (taped on September 18, 2019, aired on January 22, 2022, re-aired on February 14, 2022)	Stipulations	Times
1	Krissy Vaine (with Lana Star) defeated Chantilly Chella	Singles match	5:44
2	Adrenaline and Fire (c) vs. Amber O'Neal and Jessie Jones no contest Exile (Genesis and Malia Hosaka) (with Exodus) defeated Amber O'Neal and Jessie Jones (with Krissy Vaine and Lana Star)	Tag team match	5:53
3	Venomous defeated The Sassy Massy	Singles match	3:12
4	Jungle Grrrl defeated Tessa Blanchard	Singles match	7:51
Match No.	Episode 4 (taped on September 18, 2019, aired on January 22, 2022, re-aired on February 21, 2022)	Stipulations	Times
1	The Beast (c) defeated The Disciplinarian (with Samantha Smart)	Singles match for the WOW World Championship	2:52
2	Stephy Slays defeated Malia Hosaka (with Exodus and Genesis) by disqualification	Singles match	5:33
3	Reyna Reyes defeated Serpentine (with the Atty. Sophia Lopez)	Singles rematch	5:42
4	Holidead, Princess Aussie and Siren the Voodoo Doll vs. The Psycho Sisters (Fury, Mezmeriah and Razor) ended in a double count out	Six-woman tag team match	7:23
Match No.	Episode 5 (taped on September 18, 2019, aired on January 22, 2022, re-aired on February 28, 2022)	Stipulations	Times
1	Venomous defeated Cali Ray	Singles match	3:30
2	The Dixie Darlings (Jolene Dixie and Jolynn Dixie) defeated Amber O'Neal and Jessie Jones	Tag team match	8:36
3	Adrenaline and Fire (c) defeated Faith the Lioness and Krissy Vaine (with Lana Star)	Tag team match for the WOW World Tag Team Championship	5:08
4	The Beast (c) defeated The Temptress (with The Dagger)	Singles match for the WOW World Championship	3:00
5	The Beast (c) defeated The Dagger	Singles match for the WOW World Championship	1:04
Match No.	Episode 6 (taped on September 18, 2019, aired on January 22, 2022, re-aired on March 7, 2022)	Stipulations	Times
1	Fury (with Mezmeriah and Razor) defeated The Sassy Massy (with Chantilly Chella)	Singles match	4:36
2	Cali Ray defeated The Disciplinarian (with Samantha Smart)	Singles match	5:31
3	Serpentine (with the Atty. Sophia Lopez) defeated Chantilly Chella	Singles match	6:43
4	Tessa Blanchard defeated Reyna Reyes	Singles rematch	7:07
Match No.	Episode 7 (taped on September 19, 2019, aired on January 22, 2022, re-aired on March 14, 2022)	Stipulations	Times
1	Fire (with Adrenaline) defeated Malia Hosaka (with Exodus and Genesis)	Singles match	1:06
2	Jessie Jones defeated Cow Girl, Casey Dakota by submission	Singles match	6:28
3	Holidead (with Princess Aussie and Siren the Voodoo Doll) defeated Razor (with Fury and Mezmeriah)	Singles match	5:59
4	Venomous defeated Tessa Blanchard by disqualification	Singles match	5:19
Match No.	Episode 8 (taped on September 19, 2019, aired on January 22, 2022, re-aired on March 21, 2022)	Stipulations	Times
1	Malia Hosaka (with Exodus and Genesis) defeated Chantilly Chella	Singles match	6:16
2	Stephy Slays defeated The Temptress (with The Dagger)	Singles match	6:20
3	Krissy Vaine and Lana Star defeated Amber O'Neal and Faith the Lioness	Tag team match	4:40
4	The Beast (c) vs. Venomous by double disqualification	Singles match for the WOW World Championship	7:26
Match No.	Episode 9 (taped on September 19, 2019, aired on January 22, 2022, re-aired on March 28, 2022)	Stipulations	Times
1	Jessie Jones and Jolene Dixie (with Jolynn Dixie) defeated Chantilly Chella and The Sassy Massy by submission	Tag team match to determine the #1 contender, for a deal of the WOW World Tag Team Championship	5:59
2	Malia Hosaka (with Exodus and Genesis) defeated Cali Ray	Singles match	4:37
3	Fury (with Mezmeriah) defeated Siren the Voodoo Doll (with Holidead and Princess Aussie) by disqualification	Singles match	06:16
4	Adrenaline and Fire (c) defeated Team Blondage (Amber O'Neal and Krissy Vaine) (with Lana Star)	Tag team match for the WOW World Tag Team Championship	7:05
Match No.	Episode 10 (taped on September 19, 2019, aired on January 22, 2022, re-aired on April 4, 2022)	Stipulations	Times
1	Cali Ray and Stephy Slays defeated Exile (Exodus and Malia Hosaka) (with Genesis)	Tag team match	6:31
2	Holidead (with Princess Aussie and Siren the Voodoo Doll) vs. Spike (with Fury and Mezmeriah) ended in a no contest	Singles match	6:47
3	Faith the Lioness defeated The Temptress (with The Dagger)	Singles match	1:40
4	Tessa Blanchard defeated Serpentine (with the Atty. Sophia Lopez)	Singles match to determine the #1 contender for the WOW World Championship	6:03
Match No.	Episode 11 (taped on September 19, 2019, aired on January 22, 2022, re-aired on April 11, 2022)	Stipulations	Times
1	Stephy Slays defeated Adriana Gambino	Singles match	6:39
2	The Disciplinarian and Samantha Smart defeated Chantilly Chella and The Sassy Massy	Tag team match	5:27
3	Venomous defeated Serpentine (with the Atty. Sophia Lopez)	Singles match	4:27
4	Jessie Jones and Jolene Dixie (with Jolynn Dixie) defeated Adrenaline and Fire (c)	Tag team match for the WOW World Tag Team Championship	4:30
Match No.	Episode 12 (taped on September 19, 2019, aired on January 22, 2022, re-aired on April 18, 2022)	Stipulations	Times
1	Chainsaw (with Angelica Dante) defeated Stephy Slays	Singles match	7:37
2	The Psycho Sisters (Fury, Mezmeriah and Spike) defeated Holidead, Princess Aussie and Siren the Voodoo Doll	Six-woman tag team match	4:52
3	Faith the Lioness and Reyna Reyes defeated Team Blondage (Amber O'Neal and Krissy Vaine) (with Lana Star)	Tag team match	4:25
4	Tessa Blanchard defeated The Beast (c)	Singles match for the WOW World Championship	8:48

=== List of episodes (WOW Live Event LA Comic Con/2019) ===
The series is streaming online on wowe.com website.

Below are the results of the matches aired on the WOW website and the approximate dates they aired.

Match No.	Event: WOW Live Event LA Comic Con (aired on October 12, 2019)	Stipulations	Times
1	The Beast defeated Faith the Lioness	Singles rematch	

== WOW Season 8-11 (2022-current) ==
=== Superheroes Roster ===
The only official rosters, that returned to the promotion was Adriana Gambino, Angelica Dante, The Beast, Chantilly Chella, Chainsaw, The Disciplinarian, Exodus, Fury, Genesis, Holidead, Jessie Jones, Keta Rush, Malia Hosaka, Mezmeriah, Lana Star, Princess Aussie, Razor, Reina Del Rey formerly known as Venomous, Samantha Smart, Siren the Voodoo Doll, Sophia Lopez and Stephy Slays.

The returning of WOW Superheroes are Abilene Maverick the Governor's Daughter, Amber O'Neal formerly known as The Beverly Hills Babe and Santana Garrett.

Ring name	Real name	Notes
Abilene Maverick The Governor's Daughter	Callee Wilkerson	Season 9: Episode 13, 14, 17, 22, 26, 31, 36, 38 Former WOW World Champion
Adriana Gambino	Valentina Rossi	Season 8: Episode 1, 10 Season 9: Episode 1, 5, 8, 10, 13, 15, 20, 24, 26, 30, 35 Season 10: Episode 4, 5, 9, 11, 15, 19, 23, 28, 31, 33, 36, 37, 39, 42, 46, 51 Season 11: Episode 9
Amber O'Neal	Kimberly Dawn Davis	Formerly known as The Beverly Hills Babe
Amber Rodriguez	Amber Rodriguez	Season 8: Episode 3, 8, 11, 19, 32, 37 Formerly known as Sahara Spars
Americana	Samantha Sage	Season 8: Episode 9, 16, 32, 39 Season 9: Episode 20, 31, 35
Angel Rose	Zyra	
Arianna Gambino	Ariana Ferguson	Season 11: Episode 14, 16, 18, 21
Ariel Sky	Nikii Duke	Season 8: Episode 39 Season 9: Episode 32, 37, 41, 47, 48, 50
Ashley Blaze	Camron Clay	Season 10: Episode 6, 10, 14, 17, 19, 21, 23, 25, 27, 29, 31, 38 Season 11: Episode 7, 10, 15, 18, 21
The Beast	Twana Barnett Ferguson	Season 8: Episode 1, 4, 6, 15, 18 Season 9: Episode 3, 7, 10, 13, 14, 19, 26, 31, 33, 38, 42, 45, 47, 49 Season 10: Episode 11 Former WOW World Champion
Big Rig Betty	Maria James	Season 8: Episode 19, 21, 23, 27, 29, 40, 43, 46, 48, 51 Season 9: Episode 5, 7, 9, 12, 17, 19, 22, 24, 26, 27, 29, 32, 35, 39, 44, 46, 48, 51 Season 10: Episode 2, 5, 9, 12, 14, 17, 20, 23, 26, 28, 30, 32, 37, 45, 49, 51 Season 11: Episode 7, 11
BK Rhythm	Killa Kate Folan	Season 8: Episode 1, 7, 9, 12, 16, 20, 26, 27, 31, 34, 36, 39, 41, 44, 46, 49 Season 9: Episode 2, 29, 32, 34, 38, 40, 44, 48, 50 Season 10: Episode 2, 5, 7, 9, 11, 13, 15, 17, 19, 20, 23, 25, 26, 28, 31, 33, 36, 37, 39, 40, 42, 46, 47, 49, 51 Season 11: Episode 7, 9, 10, 14, 16, 18, 21
Brittany Bay	Britny Underwood	Season 10: Episode 5, 7, 17, 25, 28, 33, 38, 40, 41
Chainsaw	Reyna Meree Velarde	Season 10: Episode 7,
Chantilly Chella	Rachel Kelvington Bostic	Season 8: Episode 3, 9, 13, 14, 24, 27, 37, 38, 48, 51 Season 9: Episode 1, 5, 12, 18, 31
The Classmaster	Lois Grain	Season 9: Episode 11, 13, 21, 26, 32, 42, 49, 52 Season 10: Episode 2, 6, 8, 11, 16, 18, 21 Former WOW World Champion
Coach Campanelli	Alyssa Ratto	Season 8: Episode 1, 34, 45 Season 9: Episode 2, 6, 9, 15, 32, 35, 37, 46 Season 10: Episode 10,
Crystal Waters	Susie Crawford	Season 8: Episode 25, 41
Daisy Lane	Alex Underwood	Season 9: Episode 34, 37 Season 10: Episode 4, 7, 14, 18, 22, 24 Formerly known as Pep Riley
The Disciplinarian	Robyn Reid	Season 8: Episode 3, 9, 11, 14, 34 Season 9: Episode 21, 37
Exodus	Karen Tran	Season 9: Episode 12, 14, 34, 36, 41
Foxxy Fierce	Adanna Paul	Season 8: Episode 10, 13, 25, 34, 36, 46, 49 Season 10: Episode 3,
Fury	Harlow O’Hara	Season 8: Episode 26, 33, 35, 39, 42, 45, 47 Season 9: Episode 1, 9, 14, 17, 20, 39, 45, 50 Season 10: Episode 1, 4,
Genesis	Selena O'Sullivan	Season 8: Episode 27, 31 Season 9: Episode 13, 16, 31, 36, 41, 46, 49, 51 Season 10: Episode 3, 5,
GI Jane	Quanice Jackson	Season 8: Episode 12, 38, 45, 47 Season 9: Episode 3, 21, 23, 28, 32, 37, 39, 46
Gigi Gianni	Candace Michel	Season 8: Episode 3, 17, 19, 37, 40, 48, 51 Season 9: Episode 6
Glitch The Gamer	Alicia Vertvixen Bellamy	Season 8: Episode 2, 6, 12
Gloria Glitter	Delilah Doom	Season 9: Episode 5, 7, 10, 12, 16, 18, 21, 24, 34, 48
Goldie Collins	Madelyn Claire Lego	Season 9: Episode 8, 15, 20, 25, 31, 37
Holidead	Camille Ligon	Season 8: Episode 16 Season 9: Episode 2, 4, 9, 16, 25, 29
Holly Swag	Harley James	Season 10: Episode 8, 10,
The Island Girl Kalaki	Tracy Taylor	Season 10: Episode 4,
Jennifer Florez	Jazmin Allure	Season 8: Episode 19, 37, 42, 49 Season 9: Episode 1, 6, 13
Jessie Jones	Jessie Belle McCoy	Season 8: Episode 2, 14, 25, 26, 34 Season 9: Episode 10, 13, 20, 23, 49 Season 10: Episode 3, 6,
Kandi Krush	Amberley Shaw	Season 8: Episode 1, 5, 7, 13, 16, 23, 25, 27, 31, 40, 42, 47 Season 9: Episode 2, 5, 8, 11, 14, 16, 19, 25, 33, 47
Kaoz	Steffanie Manukainiu	
Kara Kai	Aurora Teves	
Katarina Jinx	Ariel de Ment	Season 9: Episode 2, 9, 15, 28, 51
Keta Rush	Keta Meggett	Season 8: Episode 16, 29, 31, 42, 44, 47 Season 9: Episode 7, 12, 41
Kona	Ashley Manukainiu	
Lovely Laurie Carlson	Lovely Laurie Carlson	
Leia Makoa	Reka Tehaka	Season 8: Episode 2, 4, 5, 7, 14, 20, 23, 30, 36
Lil J-Boogie	Jaylen Aguilar	Season 9: Episode 18, 43, 46
Luscious Lindsey Carlson	Luscious Lindsey Carlson	
Malia Hosaka	Malia Hosaka	Season 8: Episode 17, 21
Mezmeriah	Arelys Rodriguez Silva	
Miranda Mirage		
Paola Mayfield	Paola Mayfield	
Penelope Pink	Marina Tucker	Season 8: Episode 3, 5, 8, 10, 13, 24, 25, 30, 35, 42, 51 Season 9: Episode 1, 3, 5, 13, 17, 19, 28, 33, 35, 38, 43, 50, 54 Season 10: Episode 1, 3, 6, 10, Former WOW World Champion
Princess Aussie	Simone Sherie Williams	Season 8: Episode 2, 9, 20, 24, 25, 29, 31, 40, 48, 51 Season 9: Episode 2, 3, 5, 8, 10, 13, 14, 22, 24, 28, 30, 33, 41, 49 Season 10: Episode 1, Former WOW World Champion
Randi Rah Rah	Kelsey Hornack	Season 8: Episode 6, 51
Razor	Sarah Wolfe	Season 8: Episode 33, 37
Rebel Haze	Mandy O'Shaughnessy	Season 9: Episode 4, 13, 21
Reina Del Rey	Ruby Raze	Season 8: Episode 2, 4, 6, 8, 17, 19, 24, 25, 33, 35, 37 Season 9: Episode 30, 40, 50 Season 10: Episode 4, 8, Formerly known as Venomous
Robbie Rocket	Johnnie Robbie	Season 8: Episode 13, 16, 25, 26, 38, 44, 49
Roxxy Fierce	Semira Paul	Season 10: Episode 2,
Sandy Shore	Madisyn Spognola	Season 8: Episode 38, 41, 45 Season 9: Episode 26, 50
Santana Garrett	Santana Garrett	Season 9: Episode 23, 36, 51 Season 10: Episode 8, 10,
Sasha Sparks	Jacey Love	Season 9: Episode 32, 35
Scout Parker	Jennyfer Roberts	Season 8: Episode 5, 13 Season 9: Episode 10, 25, 34, 36, 41, 43, 50 Season 10: Episode 1, 9, Formerly known as Ice Cold
Sierra Breeze	Alexis Gray	Season 9: Episode 38, 45, 49
Siren The Voodoo Doll	Nina Monet	Season 10: Episode 8,
Spice	Valerie Rivera	
Sprout Greens	Alikona Shizue Bradford	
Stephy Slays	Stephanie Mason	Season 8: Episode 10, 23, 26, 32, 38 Season 9: Episode 11, 16, 26, 31, 48
Sugar	Zaida Gonzalez	
Sylvia Sanchez	Myka Madrid	Season 8: Episode 32, 42 Season 10: Episode 2,
Tara Strike	Tootie Lynn Ramsey	
Tiki Chamorro	Billionna Olivia Reyes	Season 8: Episode 12, 21, 25, 27, 35, 42, 48, 49 Season 9: Episode 3, 10, 18, 24, 28, 43 Season 10: Episode 8,
Tormenta	Cristina Ramirez	Season 8: Episode 4, 6, 7, 9, 18, 20, 22, 40, 44, 49, 51 Season 9: Episode 1, 3, 8, 13, 17, 19, 28, 40, 47, 50 Season 10: Episode 2, WOW World Champion
Valentina Diamante		Season 10: Episode 10,
Veronica Varoom	Gabrielle Vargas	
Vickie Lynn McCoy	Kelsey De Journett	Season 8: Episode 14, 23, 29, 34, 36, 41, 48 Season 9: Episode 10: 10,
Vivian Rivera	Everly Rivera	Season 8: Episode 1, 3, 17, 18, 22, 25, 26
Wrecking Ball	Heidi Howitzer	Season 8: Episode 8, 14, 23, 25, 33
Xena Phoenix	Medina Ali	Season 10: Episode 9,

=== Tag Team Roster ===
The only official tag teams that returned to the promotion was The Bully Busters, Exile, The Heavy Metal Sisters formerly known as The Psycho Sisters and The All American Girls.

Ring names	Team names	Notes
BK Rhythm Gigi Gianni Reina Del Rey	The Alliance	Season 10: Episode 11,
Americana Santana Garrett	The All American Girls	Season 9: Episode 16, 18, 25, 29, 33, 42, 46 Season 10: Episode 3, 5,
Big Rig Betty Holly Swag	The Mother Truckers	Season 8: Episode 21, 23, 27, 29, 40, 43, 46, 48, 51 Season 9: Episode 5, 7, 12, 17, 19, 22, 24, 26, 27, 29, 32, 35, 46, 48, 51 Season 10: Episode 2, 5, Former WOW World Tag Team Champions
Big Rig Betty Jessie Jones	Big Rig & Bourbon	Season 10: Episode 9,
BK Rhythm Gigi Gianni	The Brat Pack	Season 9: Episode 4, 8, 12, 17, 40, 44, 48, 50 Season 10: Episode 2, 5, 7,
Chainsaw Siren the Voodoo Doll		Season 8: Episode 3 Season 9: Episode 33, 41, 44, 48 Season 10: Episode 3, 5, 10,
Chantilly Chella Holidead		Season 9: Episode 33, 36, 40, 42, 51 Season 10: Episode 5,
The Classmaster The Disciplinarian	IQ Superior	Season 9: Episode 24, 27, 40
The Classmaster The Disciplinarian Samantha Smart	IQ Superior	Season 9: Episode 34
The Classmaster Samantha Smart	IQ Superior	Season 9: Episode 44
Coach Campanelli Gloria Glitter Kandi Krush	Top Tier	Season 9: Episode 27, 29, 39, 42, 44, 50 Season 10: Episode 1, 4, 6,
Crystal Waters Sandy Shore	Spring Break 24/7	Season 8: Episode 43 Season 9: Episode 1, 7, 12, 36, 41, 48
The Disciplinarian Samantha Smart	IQ Superior	Season 8: Episode 37
Foxxy Fierce Roxxy Fierce	The Fierce Sisters	Season 9: Episode 44, 51 Season 10: Episode 9,
Fury Sylvia Sanchez	Season 10: Episode 6,	
Gloria Glitter Kandi Krush	Top Tier	Season 10: Episode 8,
Goldie Collins Katarina Jinx	Animal Instinct	Season 9: Episode 29, 35, 39, 43, 46, 48, 52 Season 10: Episode 1, 5, 7, 9,
Kara Kai Tara Strike	The Dojo Defenders	Season 9: Episode 30, 40, 44, 47, 50 Season 10: Episode 2, 6, 8,
Lovely Laurie Carlson Luscious Lindsey Carlson	Miami's Sweet Heat The Fabulous 4	Season 8: Episode 2, 5, 8, 10, 11, 21, 24, 28, 38, 39, 43, 46, 50 Season 9: Episode 1, 4, 6, 9, 12, 14, 17, 19, 22, 23, 26, 28, 30, 32, 36, 43, 45, 51 Season 10: Episode 2, 4, 7, 9, WOW World Tag Team Champions
Lovely Laurie Carlson Luscious Lindsey Carlson Penelope Pink	The Fabulous 4	Season 9: Episode 47
Pep Riley Tiki Chamorro		Season 10: Episode 7,
Princess Aussie Tormenta	The Powerhouse Duo	Season 9: Episode 35, 37, 45 Season 10: Episode 4, 7, 10,
Scout Parker Sprout Greens		
Spice Sugar	The Mighty Mights	Season 9: Episode 15, 17, 30, 39, 45, 48 Season 10: Episode 1, 7,

The former teams

Ring names	Team names	Notes
Adriana Gambino Gigi Gianni		Season 8: Episode 6, 9, 12
Amber O'Neal Jessie Jones	Glits & Glam	Season 9: Episode 16, 18, 25
Amber Rodriguez Gigi Gianni		Season 8: Episode 21, 26, 28, 30, 35
Americana Jessie Jones		Season 8: Episode 21, 28, 36 Season 9: Episode 3, 6
Angel Rose Sylvia Sanchez	Las Bandidas	Season 9: Episode 27, 37, 40, 42, 45, 46, 49, 51
Angel Rose Sylvia Sanchez Tormenta	El Clan Latino	Season 9: Episode 30
Ariel Sky Coach Campanelli	Team Spirit	Season 9: Episode 4, 11
Ariel Sky Coach Campanelli Pep Riley	Team Spirit	Season 9: Episode 18, 22
Ariel Sky Coach Campanelli Randi Rah Rah	Team Spirit	Season 8: Episode 43
Ariel Sky Randi Rah Rah	Team Spirit	Season 8: Episode 41, 46
Ariel Sky Pep Riley Sasha Sparks	Team Spirit	Season 9: Episode 22, 27, 29
BK Rhythm Gigi Gianni Lil J-Boogie	The Brat Pack	Season 9: Episode 20, 22, 25, 34, 37
BK Rhythm Glitch The Gamer		Season 8: Episode 11
BK Rhythm Robbie Rocket	The Brat Pack	Season 8: Episode 18, 21, 23, 48
Chantilly Chella Foxxy Fierce		Season 8: Episode 6, 18, 22, 31, 41, 44
Chantilly Chella Randi Rah Rah		Season 8: Episode 1
Chantilly Chella Tiki Chamorro		Season 9: Episode 8, 14
Chainsaw Holidead	The Monsters Of Madness	Season 8: Episode 5, 7, 9, 11, 18
Chainsaw Holidead Siren The Voodoo Doll	The Monsters Of Madness	Season 8: Episode 20, 44
Coach Campanelli Pep Riley Sasha Sparks	Team Spirit	Season 9: Episode 25
Coach Campanelli Randi Rah Rah	Team Spirit	Season 8: Episode 4, 8, 14, 18, 20, 22, 24, 28, 30, 32, 37, 39 Former WOW World Tag Team Champions
The Classmaster The Disciplinarian GI Jane	IQ Superior	Season 9: Episode 18
The Classmaster GI Jane	IQ Superior	Season 9: Episode 9
The Disciplinarian GI Jane		Season 8: Episode 22, 27, 29, 32, 40, 43, 50
The Disciplinarian GI Jane Ice Cold		Season 8: Episode 19
The Disciplinarian Ice Cold Samantha Smart		Season 8: Episode 17
The Disciplinarian Jessie Jones		Season 8: Episode 6, 8
Exodus Genesis	Exile	Season 8: Episode 14, 19, 22
Exodus Genesis	Team Exile	Season 8: Episode 33 Season 9: Episode 3, 6
Exodus Genesis Ice Cold	Team Exile	Season 8: Episode 29, 35, 43, 50 Season 9: Episode 19, 23, 27
Exodus Ice Cold	Team Exile	Season 9: Episode 29
Exodus Genesis Malia Hosaka	Exile	Season 8: Episode 24
Fury Rebel Haze	The Heavy Metal Sisters	Season 9: Episode 24, 28, 36, 42, 47
Fury Mezmeriah Razor	The Heavy Metal Sisters	Season 8: Episode 5, 10
Fury Razor	The Heavy Metal Sisters	Season 8: Episode 2, 7, 17, 19, 22, 28, 30
Genesis Ice Cold	Team Exile	Season 8: Episode 39, 41
Gigi Gianni Lil J-Boogie	The Brat Pack	Season 9: Episode 30
Gigi Gianni Robbie Rocket	The Brat Pack	Season 8: Episode 46
Holidead Siren The Voodoo Doll	The Monsters Of Madness	Season 8: Episode 31, 33, 36, 40, 46, 49
Jennifer Florez Keta Rush		Season 8: Episode 21, 26
Jennifer Florez Stephy Slays		Season 8: Episode 28, 30, 35, 39, 45, 47 Season 9: Episode 4
Kandi Krush Keta Rush		Season 8: Episode 9, 11
Kandi Krush Princess Aussie		Season 8: Episode 33, 45
Kaoz Kona Leia Makoa Tiki Chamorro	The Island Dynasty	Season 8: Episode 32
Kaoz Kona	The Tonga Twins The Island Dynasty	Season 8: Episode 1, 4, 7, 10, 11, 17, 20, 22, 36, 38, 40, 46, 47, 50 Season 9: Episode 2, 4, 6, 9, 11, 15, 21, 23, 27, 43, 52 Former WOW World Tag Team Champions
Kaoz Kona Tiki Chamorro	The Island Dynasty	Season 8: Episode 24, 29, 44 Season 9: Episode 30, 34, 47
Keta Rush Stephy Slays	The Bully Busters	Season 8: Episode 3, 12
Leia Makoa Tiki Chamorro	The Island Dynasty	Season 8: Episode 18, 34
Lovely Laurie Carlson Luscious Lindsey Carlson Penelope Pink Vickie Lynn McCoy	The Fabulous 4	Season 8: Episode 32 Season 9: Episode 39
Penelope Pink Vickie Lynn McCoy	The Fabulous 4	Season 8: Episode 16, 18, 45 Season 9: Episode 24
Pep Riley Sasha Sparks	Team Spirit	Season 9: Episode 43, 49
Princess Aussie Tiki Chamorro		Season 8: Episode 4, 6
Reina Del Rey Wrecking Ball	The Last Call	Season 8: Episode 30, 41, 43, 45, 47, 49 Season 9: Episode 4, 7, 11, 15, 19, 21
Sylvia Sanchez Tormenta Vivian Rivera	El Clan Latino	Season 9: Episode 21, 23
Sylvia Sanchez Vivian Rivera	Las Bandidas	Season 8: Episode 30, 34, 36, 44, 47, 51 Season 9: Episode 2, 5, 7, 9, 11, 15, 19
Tormenta Wrecking Ball		Season 8: Episode 12

The unofficial or alliance teams

Ring names	Team names	Notes
Abilene Maverick Jessie Jones		Season 9: Episode 33
Americana Ariel Sky Santana Garrett		Season 9: Episode 44
Americana Crystal Waters Sandy Shore		Season 8: Episode 50
Americana Jennifer Florez		Season 8: Episode 43
Americana Jessie Jones Sahara Spars		Season 8: Episode 17
Ariel Sky Big Rig Betty Holly Swag		Season 9: Episode 39
Ariel Sky Lil J-Boogie Stephy Slays		Season 9: Episode 50
The Beast Kaoz Kona Tiki Chamorro		Season 9: Episode 39
Big Rig Betty Holly Swag Jessie Jones		Season 8: Episode 19
BK Rhythm Jessie Jones		Season 8: Episode 4
Chainsaw The Classmaster		Season 9: Episode 51
Chainsaw Reina Del Ray		Season 9: Episode 35
Chantilly Chella Coach Campanelli Randi Rah Rah		Season 8: Episode 10
Chantilly Chella Crystal Waters Sandy Shore		Season 9: Episode 20
Chantilly Chella Foxxy Fierce Kandi Krush		Season 8: Episode 20
Chantilly Chella Holidead The Island Girl Kalaki		Season 10: Episode 1, 8,
Chantilly Chella Keta Rush		Season 8: Episode 33
Foxxy Fierce Ice Cold		Season 8: Episode 2
Foxxy Fierce Kandi Krush		Season 8: Episode 50
Foxxy Fierce Tiki Chamorro		Season 8: Episode 16
Fury Genesis Sylvia Sanchez		Season 10: Episode 8,
Fury Holidead Siren The Voodoo Doll		Season 8: Episode 50
Foxxy Fierce Roxxy Fierce Tiki Chamorro		Season 10: Episode 6
Jennifer Florez Keta Rush Stephy Slays		Season 8: Episode 50
Kandi Krush Keta Rush Princess Aussie		Season 8: Episode 35
Keta Rush Spice Sugar		Season 9: Episode 21, 37 Season 10: Episode 4, 11,
Keta Rush Stephy Slays Vivian Rivera		Season 8: Episode 5
Leia Makoa Princess Aussie		Season 8: Episode 12
Lil J-Boogie Stephy Slays		Season 9: Episode 40
Sierra Breeze Kara Kai Tara Strike		Season 9: Episode 42
Spice Stephy Slays Sugar		Season 9: Episode 19, 34
Stephy Slays Vivian Rivera		Season 8: Episode 7

=== Other on-air Personnel Roster ===
The original WOW Superhero is only the former WOW World Champion, Lana Star.

Ring name	Real name	Notes
Abilene Maverick	Calle Wilkerson	Manager of Paola Mayfield the Colombian Goat
Adriana Gambino	Valentina Rossi	Manager of The Alliance (Reina Del Rey and The Brat Pack (BK Rhythm and Gigi Gianni))
Angelica Dante	Harley Hurpurr	Manager of Chainsaw Former team, Holidead and Siren the Voodoo Doll
Lana Star	Lana Kinnear	Manager of The Fabulous 4 (Penelope Pink, Miami's Sweet Heat (Lovely Laurie Carlson and Luscious Lindsey Carlson) and Holly Swag Former protege, Vickie Lynn McCoy
Samantha Smart	Kirsten Garner	Manager of the IQ Superior, The Classmaster Former protege, The Disciplinarian, GI Jane and Ice Cold
Sophia López	Leslie Garza	Manager of Tormenta Former protege, Las Bandidas (Angel Rose and Sylvia Sanchez), Vivian Rivera and Wrecking Ball

Referees

Paige Prinzivalli
Ben Sheinsburg
Jeff McCowan

=== List of episodes (season 8/2022-2023) ===
The series is aired on broadcast syndication and CHCH, and streaming on CW Seed, Pluto TV, Facebook and its YouTube channel.

Below are the results of the matches as aired on the TV show and the approximate airdates.

Match No.	Episode 1: The Battle Begins! (taped on May 5, 2022, aired on September 17, 2022)	Stipulations	Times
1	The Tonga Twins (Kaoz and Kona) (with the Tonga Dancers) defeated Chantilly Chella and Randi Rah Rah	Tag team tournament quarterfinals match for the WOW World Tag Team Championship	4:35
2	Kandi Krush defeated Coach Campanelli	Singles match	4:31
3	Vivian Rivera defeated BK Rhythm	Singles match	3:07
4	The Beast (c) defeated Adriana Gambino	Singles match for the WOW World Championship	3:14
Match No.	Episode 2: Superheroes Attack (taped on May 5, 2022, aired on September 24, 2022)	Stipulations	Times
1	Miami's Sweet Heat (Laurie Carlson and Lindsey Carlson) defeated The Heavy Metal Sisters (Fury and Razor) (with Mezmeriah)	Tag team tournament quarterfinals match for the WOW World Tag Team Championship	5:36
2	Foxxy Fierce vs. Ice Cold no contest Jessie Jones defeated Foxxy Fierce and Ice Cold by submission	Handicap match	3:57
3	Leia Makoa defeated Glitch the Gamer	Singles match	4:52
4	Reina Del Rey defeated Princess Aussie	Singles Match	5:46
Match No.	Episode 3: Tag Me In (taped on May 6, 2022, aired on October 1, 2022)	Stipulations	Times
1	The Monsters Of Madness (Chainsaw and Siren the Voodoo Doll) defeated The Bully Busters (Keta Rush and Stephy Slays)	Tag team tournament quarterfinals match for the WOW World Tag Team Championship	3:57
2	Chantilly Chella defeated The Disciplinarian (with Samantha Smart)	Singles match	4:09
3	Sahara Spars defeated Gigi Gianni	Singles match	4:51
4	Penelope Pink (with Lana Star) defeated Vivian Rivera	Singles match	5:18
Match No.	Episode 4: Fight Fire With Fire (taped on May 7, 2022, aired on October 8, 2022)	Stipulations	Times
1	The Tonga Twins (Kaoz and Kona) defeated Princess Aussie and Tiki Chamorro	Tag team tournament quarterfinals match for the WOW World Tag Team Championship	6:06
2	BK Rhythm vs. Randi Rah Rah no contest Team Spirit (Coach Campanelli and Randi Rah Rah) defeated BK Rhythm and Jessie Jones	Tag team match	4:55
3	Reina Del Rey defeated Leia Makoa	Singles match	3:25
4	The Beast (c) vs. Tormenta (with the Atty. Sophia Lopez) ended in a no contest	Singles match for the WOW World Championship	1:58
Match No.	Episode 5: Double Trouble, Triple Threat (taped on July 13, 2022, aired on October 15, 2022)	Stipulations	Times
1	Miami's Sweet Heat (Laurie Carlson and Lindsey Carlson) defeated The Monsters Of Madness (Chainsaw and Holidead) (with Siren the Voodoo Doll)	Tag team tournament semifinals match for the WOW World Tag Team Championship	5:17
2	Kandi Krush defeated Ice Cold	Singles match	5:49
3	The Heavy Metal Sisters (Fury, Mezmeriah and Razor) defeated The Bully Busters (Keta Rush and Stephy Slays) and Vivian Rivera	Six-woman tag team match	3:09
4	Leia Makoa defeated Penelope Pink (with Lana Star)	Singles match	5:53
Match No.	Episode 6: The Three Way Dance (taped on July 14, 2022, aired on October 22, 2022)	Stipulations	Times
1	Adriana Gambino and Gigi Gianni defeated Chantilly Chella and Foxxy Fierce	Tag team tournament semifinals match for the WOW World Tag Team Championship	6:10
2	Randi Rah Rah defeated Glitch the Gamer	Singles match	5:42
3	The Disciplinarian and Jessie Jones (with Samantha Smart defeated Princess Aussie and Tiki Chamorro by submission	Tag team match	6:29
4	The Beast (c) defeated Reina Del Rey defeated Tormenta	Triple threat match for the WOW World Championship	2:56
Match No.	Episode 7: Battle Against the Odds (taped on July 15, 2022, aired on October 29, 2022)	Stipulations	Times
1	The Tonga Twins (Kaoz and Kona) defeated The Heavy Metal Sisters (Fury and Razor) (with Mezmeriah)	Tag team tournament semifinals match for the WOW World Tag Team Championship	6:27
2	Kandi Krush defeated BK Rhythm	Singles match	4:31
3	The Monsters Of Madness (Chainsaw and Holidead) (with Siren the Voodoo Doll) defeated Stephy Slays and Vivian Rivera	Tag team match	6:38
4	Leia Makoa defeated Tormenta (with the Atty. Sophia Lopez)	Singles match	8:21
Match No.	Episode 8: Shock, Drop and Roll (taped on July 15, 2022, aired on November 5, 2022)	Stipulations	Times
1	Miami's Sweet Heat (Laurie Carlson and Lindsey Carlson) defeated Adriana Gambino and Gigi Gianni	Tag team tournament semifinals match for the WOW World Tag Team Championship	4:44
2	Penelope Pink (with Lana Star) defeated Sahara Spars	Singles match	6:40
3	Team Spirit (Coach Campanelli and Randi Rah Rah) defeated The Disciplinarian and Jessie Jones (with Samantha Smart)	Tag team tournament quarterfinals match for the WOW World Tag Team Championship	4:53
4	Reina Del Rey vs. Wrecking Ball ended in a double count out	Singles match	2:21
Match No.	Episode 9: Out of Control Mayhem (taped on August 26, 2022, aired on November 12, 2022)	Stipulations	Times
1	Americana defeated The Disciplinarian (with Samantha Smart)	Singles match	3:34
2	Chantilly Chella defeated BK Rhythm	Singles match	4:05
3	Kandi Krush and Keta Rush defeated The Monsters Of Madness (Chainsaw and Holidead) (with Siren the Voodoo Doll)	Tag team match	5:25
4	Princess Aussie defeated Tormenta (with the Atty. Sophia Lopez)	Singles match	5:44
Match No.	Episode 10: Twins versus Twins (taped on August 26, 2022, aired on November 19, 2022)	Stipulations	Times
1	The Heavy Metal Sisters (Fury, Mezmeriah and Razor) defeated Chantilly Chella and Team Spirit (Coach Campanelli and Randi Rah Rah)	Six-woman tag team match	5:10
2	Stephy Slays defeated Adriana Gambino	Singles rematch	5:54
3	Penelope Pink (with Lana Star) defeated Foxxy Fierce	Singles match	5:38
4	Miami's Sweet Heat (Laurie Carlson and Lindsey Carlson) vs. The Tonga Twins (Kaoz and Kona) ended in a no contest	Tag team tournament finals match for the WOW World Tag Team Championship	6:54
Match No.	Episode 11: 3, 2, 1, -WOW (taped on August 27, 2022, aired on November 26, 2022)	Stipulations	Times
1	Sahara Spars defeated The Disciplinarian (with Ice Cold and Samantha Smart)	Singles match	4:24
2	BK Rhythm and Glitch the Gamer defeated Kandi Krush and Keta Rush	Tag team match	4:09
3	The Tonga Twins (Kaoz and Kona) defeated Miami's Sweet Heat (Laurie Carlson and Lindsey Carlson) defeated The Monsters Of Madness (Chainsaw and Holidead) (with Siren the Voodoo Doll)	Tag team tournament semifinals Three-way elimination match to determine for the finals of WOW World Tag Team Championship	3:20
Match No.	Episode 12: The Final Countdown (taped on August 28, 2022, aired on December 3, 2022)	Stipulations	Times
1	GI Jane defeated BK Rhythm	Singles match	2:21
2	Adriana Gambino and Gigi Gianni defeated The Bully Busters (Keta Rush and Stephy Slays)	Tag team match	4:43
3	Glitch the Gamer defeated Tiki Chamorro	Singles match	3:21
4	Leia Makoa and Princess Aussie defeated Tormenta and Wrecking Ball (with the Atty. Sophia Lopez)	Tag team match	3:54
Match No.	Episode 13: Too Much WOW to Handle (taped on September 21, 2022, aired on December 10, 2022)	Stipulations	Times
1	Robbie Rocket defeated Kandi Krush	Singles match	6:11
2	Foxxy Fierce defeated Ice Cold	Singles match	6:25
3	Penelope Pink (with Lana Star) defeated Chantilly Chella	Singles match	4:18
4	Miami's Sweet Heat (Laurie Carlson and Lindsey Carlson) defeated The Tonga Twins (Kaoz and Kona)	Tag team tournament finals match for the WOW World Tag Team Championship	7:14
Match No.	Episode 14: Superheroes versus Villains (taped on September 22, 2022, aired on December 17, 2022)	Stipulations	Times
1	Team Spirit (Coach Campanelli and Randi Rah Rah) vs. Adriana Gambino and Gigi Gianni no contest Exile (Exodus and Genesis) (with Malia Hosaka) defeated Team Spirit (Coach Campanelli and Randi Rah Rah)	Tag team match	7:25
2	Vickie Lynn McCoy (with Lana Star) defeated Chantilly Chella	Singles match	4:00
3	Jessie Jones defeated The Disciplinarian (with Samantha Smart) by disqualification	Singles match	3:40
4	Leia Makoa defeated Wrecking Ball	Singles match	5:53
Episode 15: The Champ is Here (taped on September 23, 2022, aired on December 24, 2022)
The tribute of the WOW World Champion, and the host David Mclain he welcoming the Beast for her back!...after suffering two devastating injuries in a raw, first the triple threat championship match against Reina Del Rey and Tormenta could be injured and then at the hands of unknown assailant under the cover of the night all forcing the WOW World Champion the Beast out of action for weeks the Beast has been waiting medical clearance so she can't return to defend the championship title.
Match No.	Episode 16: Chance Encounters (taped on November 10, 2022, aired on December 31, 2022)	Stipulations	Times
1	Americana defeated BK Rhythm	Singles match	4:06
2	Robbie Rocket defeated Keta Rush	Singles match	6:26
3	Holidead defeated Kandi Krush	Singles match	4:53
4	The Fabulous 4 (Penelope Pink and Vickie Lynn McCoy) (with Lana Star) defeated Foxxy Fierce and Tiki Chamorro	Tag team match	7:18
Match No.	Episode 17: Picking Sides: Where is Your Loyalty? (taped on November 10, 2022, aired on January 7, 2023)	Stipulations	Times
1	The Tonga Twins (Kaoz and Kona) defeated The Heavy Metal Sisters (Fury and Razor) (with Mezmeriah)	Tag team match	5:48
2	Malia Hosaka (with Exodus and Genesis) defeated Gigi Gianni	Singles match	4:16
3	Reina Del Rey defeated Vivian Rivera	Singles match	5:01
4	Americana, Jessie Jones and Sahara Spars defeated The Disciplinarian, Ice Cold and Samantha Smart by submission	Six-woman tag team match	3:51
Match No.	Episode 18: Return of the Beast (taped on November 11, 2022, aired on January 14, 2023)	Stipulations	Times
1	Team Spirit (Coach Campanelli and Randi Rah Rah) defeated BK Rhythm and Robbie Rocket	Tag team match	4:33
2	Chantilly Chella and Foxxy Fierce defeated The Monsters Of Madness (Chainsaw and Holidead) (with Siren the Voodoo Doll)	Tag team match	5:00
3	Vivian Rivera defeated Tormenta (with the Atty. Sophia Lopez)	Singles match	3:45
4	The Fabulous 4 (Penelope Pink and Vickie Lynn McCoy) (with Lana Star, Laurie Carlson and Lindsey Carlson) defeated The Island Dynasty (Leia Makoa and Tiki Chamorro)	Tag team match	6:47
Match No.	Episode 19: Determination and Destruction (taped on November 11, 2022, aired on January 21, 2023)	Stipulations	Times
1	Exile (Exodus and Genesis) (with Malia Hosaka defeated The Heavy Metal Sisters (Fury and Razor) (with Mezmeriah)	Tag team match	6:57
2	Gigi Gianni defeated Jennifer Florez	Singles match	5:35
3	Reina Del Rey defeated Sahara Spars	Singles match	3:47
4	The Mother Truckers (Big Rig Betty and Holly Swag) and Jessie Jones defeated The Disciplinarian, GI Jane and Ice Cold (with Samantha Smart) by submission	Six-woman tag team match	5:01
Match No.	Episode 20: Hunt for Score (taped on November 12, 2022, aired on January 28, 2023)	Stipulations	Times
1	Princess Aussie defeated BK Rhythm	Singles match	5:32
2	The Monsters Of Madness (Chainsaw, Holidead and Siren the Voodoo Doll) defeated Chantilly Chella, Foxxy Fierce and Kandi Krush	Six-woman tag team match	4:21
3	Team Spirit (Coach Campanelli and Randi Rah Rah) defeated The Tonga Twins (Kaoz and Kona)	Tag team match	4:18
4	Leia Makoa defeated Tormenta (with the Atty. Sophia Lopez)	Singles match	3:31
Match No.	Episode 21: Curveball Contenders (taped on November 12, 2022, aired on February 4, 2023)	Stipulations	Times
1	Jennifer Florez and Keta Rush defeated BK Rhythm and Robbie Rocket	Tag team match	5:06
2	Malia Hosaka (with Exodus and Genesis) defeated Tiki Chamorro	Singles match	4:16
3	Americana and Jessie Jones defeated Amber Rodriguez and Gigi Gianni	Tag team match	5:18
4	Miami's Sweet Heat (Laurie Carlson and Lindsey Carlson) (c) (with Lana Star, Penelope Pink and Vickie Lynn McCoy) defeated The Mother Truckers (Big Rig Betty and Holly Swag)	Tag team match for the WOW World Tag Team Championship	8:36
Match No.	Episode 22: Dancing to a Different Drum (taped on December 2, 2022, aired on February 11, 2023)	Stipulations	Times
1	Chantilly Chella and Foxxy Fierce defeated The Heavy Metal Sisters (Fury and Razor) (with Mezmeriah)	Tag team match	5:52
2	Team Spirit (Coach Campanelli and Randi Rah Rah) defeated The Disciplinarian and GI Jane (with Ice Cold and Samantha Smart)	Tag team match	6:04
3	Tormenta (with the Atty. Sophia Lopez) defeated Vivian Rivera	Singles rematch	3:41
4	The Tonga Twins (Kaoz and Kona) defeated Exile (Exodus and Genesis) (with Malia Hosaka)	Tag team match	6:58
Match No.	Episode 23: Evening the Score (taped on December 2, 2022, aired on February 18, 2023)	Stipulations	Times
1	The Mother Truckers (Big Rig Betty and Holly Swag) defeated BK Rhythm and Robbie Rocket	Tag team match	4:39
2	Vickie Lynn McCoy (with Lana Star) defeated Stephy Slays	WOW World Championship qualifying Gauntlet match	4:02
3	Leia Makoa defeated Wrecking Ball	WOW World Championship qualifying Gauntlet match	3:36
4	Chainsaw (with Holidead and Siren the Voodoo Doll) defeated Kandi Krush	Singles match	4:06
Match No.	Episode 24: Unlikely Teams (taped on December 3, 2022, aired on February 25, 2023)	Stipulations	Times
1	The Island Dynasty (Kaoz, Kona and Tiki Chamorro) defeated Exile (Exodus, Genesis and Malia Hosaka)	Six-woman tag team match	1:30
2	Princess Aussie defeated Penelope Pink (with Lana Star)	WOW World Championship qualifying Gauntlet match	7:22
3	Reina Del Rey defeated Chantilly Chella	WOW World Championship qualifying Gauntlet match	4:41
4	Team Spirit (Coach Campanelli and Randi Rah Rah) defeated Miami's Sweet Heat (Laurie Carlson and Lindsey Carlson) (c) (with Lana Star, Penelope Pink and Vickie Lynn McCoy)	Tag team match for the WOW World Tag Team Championship	5:57
Match No.	Episode 25: Wild Card (taped on December 4, 2022, aired on March 4, 2023)	Stipulations	Times
1	Miami's Sweet Heat (Laurie Carlson and Lindsey Carlson) (with Lana Star) defeated Team Spirit (Coach Campanelli and Randi Rah Rah) (c)	Tag team rematch for the WOW World Tag Team Championship	6:43
2	Kandi Krush defeated Chainsaw (with Angelica Dante)	Singles rematch	3:27
3	Penelope Pink won by last eliminating Foxxy Fierce (the other participants are Crystal Waters, Jessie Jones, Princess Aussie, Reina Del Rey, Robbie Rocket, Tiki Chamorro, Vivian Rivera and Wrecking Ball)	Gauntlet match for the vacant WOW World Championship	4:46
Match No.	Episode 26: Collision Course (taped on December 3, 2022, aired on March 11, 2023)	Stipulations	Times
1	Robbie Rocket defeated Vivian Rivera	Singles match	4:21
2	Stephy Slays defeated BK Rhythm	Singles match	3:58
3	Jennifer Florez and Keta Rush defeated Amber Rodriguez and Gigi Gianni	Tag team match	6:09
4	Jessie Jones defeated Fury (with Mezmeriah and Razor) by submission	Singles match	5:49
Match No.	Episode 27: Fans Want Answers (taped on February 24, 2023, aired on March 18, 2023)	Stipulations	Times
1	Tiki Chamorro defeated Genesis (with Exodus and Ice Cold)	Singles match	5:35
2	BK Rhythm defeated Chantilly Chella	Singles rematch	5:19
3	The Disciplinarian and GI Jane (with Samantha Smart) defeated The Mother Truckers (Big Rig Betty and Holly Swag)	Tag team match	5:36
4	Kandi Krush defeated Siren the Voodoo Doll	Singles match	3:19
Match No.	Episode 28: Never Take a Loss Lying Down (taped on February 24, 2023, aired on March 25, 2023)	Stipulations	Times
1	Jennifer Florez and Stephy Slays defeated Amber Rodriguez and Gigi Gianni	Tag team match	4:36
2	The Heavy Metal Sisters (Fury and Razor) (with Mezmeriah) defeated Americana and Jessie Jones	Tag team match	4:41
3	Foxxy Fierce defeated Holidead	Singles match	5:10
4	Miami's Sweet Heat (Laurie Carlson and Lindsey Carlson) (c) (with Lana Star and Vickie Lynn McCoy) defeated Team Spirit (Coach Campanelli and Randi Rah Rah) by disqualification	Tag team rematch for the WOW World Tag Team Championship	7:35
Match No.	Episode 29: Rulebooks & Rematches (taped on February 25, 2023, aired on April 1, 2023)	Stipulations	Times
1	Keta Rush defeated Chainsaw (with Angelica Dante) by disqualification	Singles match	3:58
2	The Island Dynasty (Kaoz, Kona and Tiki Chamorro) defeated Team Exile (Exodus, Genesis and Ice Cold)	Six-woman tag team match	5:39
3	The Mother Truckers (Big Rig Betty and Holly Swag) defeated The Disciplinarian and GI Jane (with Samantha Smart)	Tag team rematch	5:54
4	Vickie Lynn McCoy (with Lana Star) defeated Princess Aussie	Singles match	6:38
Match No.	Episode 30: Defending the Title (taped on February 25, 2023, aired on April 8, 2023)	Stipulations	Times
1	Las Bandidas (Sylvia Sanchez and Vivian Rivera) (with the Atty. Sophia Lopez) defeated Jennifer Florez and Stephy Slays	Tag team match	6:33
2	The Heavy Metal Sisters (Fury and Razor) (with Mezmeriah) vs. The Last Call (Reina Del Rey and Wrecking Ball) by a double disqualification	Tag team match	5:45
3	Team Spirit (Coach Campanelli and Randi Rah Rah) defeated Amber Rodriguez and Gigi Gianni	Tag team match	5:47
4	Penelope Pink (c) (with Lana Star) defeated Leia Makoa	Singles match for the WOW World Championship	6:49
Match No.	Episode 31: Unruly Souls (taped on February 26, 2023, aired on April 15, 2023)	Stipulations	Times
1	BK Rhythm defeated Keta Rush	Singles match	4:27
2	Kandi Krush defeated Genesis (with Exodus and Ice Cold)	Singles match	6:18
3	The Monsters Of Madness (Holidead and Siren the Voodoo Doll) defeated Chantilly Chella and Foxxy Fierce	Tag team match	5:59
4	Princess Aussie defeated Chainsaw (with Angelica Dante) by disqualification	Singles match	4:56
Match No.	Episode 32: Even the Score (taped on February 26, 2023, aired on April 22, 2023)	Stipulations	Times
1	Stephy Slays defeated Amber Rodriguez	Singles match	4:16
2	The Disciplinarian and GI Jane (with Samantha Smart) defeated Team Spirit (Coach Campanelli and Randi Rah Rah) by submission	Tag team rematch	5:12
3	Americana and Jessie Jones defeated Las Bandidas (Sylvia Sanchez and Vivian Rivera) (with the Atty. Sophia Lopez) no contest Sylvia Sanchez (with Vivian Rivera and the Atty. Sophia Lopez) defeated Americana (with Jessie Jones)	Singles match	4:08
4	The Island Dynasty (Kaoz, Kona, Leia Makoa and Tiki Chamorro) defeated The Fabulous 4 (Laurie Carlson, Lindsey Carlson, Penelope Pink and Vickie Lynn McCoy) (with Lana Star)	Eight-woman tag team match	6:40
Match No.	Episode 33: Sister Collide (taped on March 1, 2023, aired on April 29, 2023)	Stipulations	Times
1	Jennifer Florez defeated Gigi Gianni	Singles rematch	4:48
2	Team Exile (Exodus and Genesis) (with Ice Cold) defeated Kandi Krush and Princess Aussie	Tag team match	6:03
3	The Monsters Of Madness (Holidead and Siren the Voodoo Doll) defeated Chantilly Chella and Keta Rush	Tag team match	5:47
4	Reina Del Rey defeated Fury defeated Razor defeated Wrecking Ball	Fatal 4-way match for the No disqualification	5:58
Match No.	Episode 34: Spacial Stipulations (taped on March 1, 2023, aired on May 6, 2023)	Stipulations	Times
1	Vickie Lynn McCoy (with Lana Star) defeated Foxxy Fierce	Singles match	5:20
2	The Island Dynasty (Leia Makoa and Tiki Chamorro) defeated Las Bandidas (Sylvia Sanchez and Vivian Rivera) (with the Atty. Sophia Lopez)	Tag team match	6:36
3	BK Rhythm defeated Jessie Jones	Singles match	0:55
4	Coach Campanelli (with Randi Rah Rah) defeated The Disciplinarian (with Samantha Smart)	Singles match	4:15
Match No.	Episode 35: The Underdog (taped on March 2, 2023, aired on May 13, 2023)	Stipulations	Times
1	Amber Rodriguez and Gigi Gianni defeated Jennifer Florez and Stephy Slays	Tag team rematch	5:21
2	Kandi Krush, Keta Rush and Princess Aussie defeated Team Exile (Exodus, Genesis and Ice Cold)	Six-woman tag team match	6:17
3	Reina Del Ray defeated Fury	Singles match	1:44
4	Penelope Pink (c) (with Lana Star) defeated Tiki Chamorro	Singles match for the WOW World Championship	6:00
Match No.	Episode 36: Warriors and Monsters (taped on March 2, 2023, aired on May 20, 2023)	Stipulations	Times
1	The Tonga Twins (Kaoz and Kona) defeated Las Bandidas (Sylvia Sanchez and Vivian Rivera) (with the Atty. Sophia Lopez)	Tag team match	4:19
2	Foxxy Fierce defeated BK Rhythm	Singles match	5:29
3	The Monsters Of Madness (Holidead and Siren the Voodoo Doll) defeated Americana and Jessie Jones	Tag team match	6:11
4	Vickie Lynn McCoy (with Lana Star) defeated Leia Makoa	Singles match	2:08
Match No.	Episode 37: School Yard Brawl (taped on March 3, 2023, aired on May 27, 2023)	Stipulations	Times
1	Chantilly Chella defeated Gigi Gianni	Singles match	6:13
2	Razor (with Fury) defeated Amber Rodriguez	Singles match	4:37
3	Reina Del Rey defeated Jennifer Florez	Singles match	3:43
4	Coach Campanelli and Randi Rah Rah defeated The Disciplinarian and Samantha Smart	Tag team match for the No disqualification School Yard Brawl	4:10
Match No.	Episode 38: No More Running (taped on March 3, 2023, aired on June 3, 2023)	Stipulations	Times
1	Sandy Shore defeated Robbie Rocket	Singles match	2:15
2	GI Jane defeated Chantilly Chella	Singles match	4:02
3	Chainsaw (with Angelica Dante) defeated Stephy Slays	Singles rematch	4:33
4	The Tonga Twins (Kaoz and Kona) defeated Miami's Sweet Heat (Laurie Carlson and Lindsey Carlson) (c) (with Lana Star) by disqualification	Tag team match for the WOW World Tag Team Championship	6:58
Match No.	Episode 39: Brocken and Blindsided (taped on April 28, 2023, aired on June 10, 2023)	Stipulations	Times
1	Ariel Sky defeated BK Rhythm	Singles match	4:07
2	Americana vs. Fury (with Mezmeriah and Razor) no contest	Singles match	0:19
3	Team Spirit (Coach Campanelli and Randi Rah Rah) defeated Team Exile (Genesis and Ice Cold)	Tag team match	5:49
4	Miami's Sweet Heat (Laurie Carlson and Lindsey Carlson) (c) (with Lana Star) defeated Jennifer Florez and Stephy Slays	Tag team match for the WOW World Tag Team Championship	6:14
Match No.	Episode 40: Welcomings and Whoopings (taped on April 28, 2023, aired on June 17, 2023)	Stipulations	Times
1	The Tonga Twins (Kaoz and Kona) defeated The Monsters Of Madness (Holidead and Siren the Voodoo Doll)	Tag team match	3:58
2	Kandi Krush defeated Gigi Gianni	Singles match	5:34
3	Princess Aussie defeated Tormenta (with the Atty. Sophia Lopez)	Singles match	5:20
4	The Mother Truckers (Big Rig Betty and Holly Swag) defeated The Disciplinarian and GI Jane (with Samantha Smart)	Tag team rematch	5:04
Match No.	Episode 41: Newcomes (taped on April 29, 2023, aired on June 24, 2023)	Stipulations	Times
1	The Last Call (Reina Del Rey and Wrecking Ball) defeated Chantilly Chella and Foxxy Fierce	Tag team match	3:44
2	BK Rhythm defeated Crystal Waters	Singles match	3:41
3	Team Exile (Genesis and Ice Cold) defeated Team Spirit (Ariel Sky and Randi Rah Rah) (with Coach Campanelli)	Tag team match	4:57
4	Vickie Lynn McCoy (with Lana Star) defeated Sandy Shore	Singles match	3:16
Match No.	Episode 42: Manipulative Maneuvers (taped on April 29, 2023, aired on July 1, 2023)	Stipulations	Times
1	Chainsaw (with Angelica Dante) defeated Tiki Chamorro	Singles match	4:58
2	Sylvia Sanchez (with Vivian Rivera and the Atty. Sophia Lopez) defeated Keta Rush by submission	Singles match	5:29
3	Fury (with Mezmeriah and Razor) defeated Jennifer Florez	Singles match	5:29
4	Penelope Pink (c) (with Vickie Lynn McCoy and Lana Star) defeated Kandi Krush	Singles match for the WOW World Championship	6:50
Match No.	Episode 43: Tag Team Only! (taped on April 30, 2023, aired on July 8, 2023)	Stipulations	Times
1	The Last Call (Reina Del Rey and Wrecking Ball) defeated Spring Break 24/7 (Crystal Waters and Sandy Shore)	Tag team match	5:01
2	Team Spirit (Ariel Sky, Coach Campanelli and Randi Rah Rah) defeated Team Exile (Exodus, Genesis and Ice Cold)	Six-woman tag team match	5:18
3	The Disciplinarian and GI Jane (with Samantha Smart) defeated Americana and Jennifer Florez	Tag team match	6:11
4	The Mother Truckers (Big Rig Betty and Holly Swag) defeated Miami's Sweet Heat (Laurie Carlson and Lindsey Carlson) (c) (with Lana Star)	Tag team match	6:15
Match No.	Episode 44: Summoning the Monsters (taped on April 30, 2023, aired on July 15, 2023)	Stipulations	Times
1	Keta Rush defeated BK Rhythm	Singles match	2:52
2	Las Bandidas (Sylvia Sanchez and Vivian Rivera) (with the Atty. Sophia Lopez) defeated Chantilly Chella and Foxxy Fierce	Tag team match	4:45
3	Tormenta (with the Atty. Sophia Lopez) defeated Robbie Rocket	Singles match	4:09
4	The Island Dynasty (Kaoz, Kona and Tiki Chamorro) defeated The Monsters Of Madness (Chainsaw, Holidead and Siren the Voodoo Doll) (with Angelica Dante)	Six-woman tag team match	4:01
Match No.	Episode 45: Queens Of Mean (taped on June 23, 2023, aired on July 22, 2023)	Stipulations	Times
1	The Last Call (Reina Del Rey and Wrecking Ball) defeated Jennifer Florez and Stephy Slays	Tag team match	4:05
2	Coach Campanelli defeated GI Jane	Singles match	3:50
3	Fury (with Mezmeriah and Razor) defeated Sandy Shore	Singles match	4:10
4	Kandi Krush and Princess Aussie defeated The Fabulous 4 (Penelope Pink (c) and Vickie Lynn McCoy) (with Lana Star)	Tag team match	6:26
Match No.	Episode 46: When Opportunity Knocks (taped on June 23, 2023, aired on July 29, 2023)	Stipulations	Times
1	The Tonga Twins (Kaoz and Kona) defeated Gigi Gianni and Robbie Rocket	Tag team match	4:32
2	BK Rhythm defeated Foxxy Fierce	Singles match	3:27
3	The Mother Truckers (Big Rig Betty and Holly Swag) defeated The Monsters Of Madness (Holidead and Siren the Voodoo Doll)	Tag team match	5:30
4	Miami's Sweet Heat (Laurie Carlson and Lindsey Carlson) (c) (with Lana Star) defeated Team Spirit (Ariel Sky and Randi Rah Rah) (with Coach Campanelli)	Tag team match for the WOW World Tag Team Championship	5:07
Match No.	Episode 47: Living It All in the Ring (taped on June 24, 2023, aired on August 5, 2023)	Stipulations	Times
1	Las Bandidas (Sylvia Sanchez and Vivian Rivera) (with the Atty. Sophia Lopez) defeated Jennifer Florez and Stephy Slays	Tag team match	5:02
2	Kandi Krush defeated GI Jane	Singles match	5:23
3	Fury (with Mezmeriah and Razor) defeated Keta Rush	Singles match	5:41
4	The Tonga Twins (Kaoz and Kona) defeated The Last Call (Reina Del Rey and Wrecking Ball)	Tag team match to determine the #1 contender's for the WOW World Tag Team Championship	3:41
Match No.	Episode 48: The Last Stand (taped on June 24, 2023, aired on August 12, 2023)	Stipulations	Times
1	Chainsaw (with Angelica Dante) defeated Chantilly Chella	Singles match	4:17
2	Gigi Gianni defeated Tiki Chamorro	Singles match	3:35
3	The Mother Truckers (Big Rig Betty and Holly Swag) defeated BK Rhythm and Robbie Rocket	Tag team match	6:11
4	Princess Aussie defeated Vickie Lynn McCoy (with Lana Star)	Singles rematch	4:13
Match No.	Episode 49: Leaps, Luchadoras and Monsters Clash (taped on June 25, 2023, aired on August 19, 2023)	Stipulations	Times
1	Tiki Chamorro defeated BK Rhythm	Singles match	3:39
2	Foxxy Fierce defeated Robbie Rocket	Singles match	5:45
3	Tormenta (with the Atty. Sophia Lopez) defeated Jennifer Florez	Singles match	5:38
4	The Last Call (Reina Del Rey and Wrecking Ball) vs. The Monsters Of Madness (Holidead and Siren the Voodoo Doll) ended in a no contest	Tag team match	5:11
Match No.	Episode 50: Falls Count Anywhere Championship (taped on June 25, 2023, aired on August 26, 2023)	Stipulations	Times
1	Team Exile (Exodus, Genesis and Ice Cold) defeated Jennifer Florez and The Bully Busters (Keta Rush and Stephy Slays)	Six-woman tag team match	5:30
2	Foxxy Fierce and Kandi Krush defeated The Disciplinarian and GI Jane (with Samantha Smart)	Tag team match	4:45
3	Americana and Spring Break 24/7 (Crystal Waters and Sandy Shore) defeated Fury and The Monsters Of Madness (Holidead and Siren the Voodoo Doll)	Six-woman tag team match	3:49
4	The Tonga Twins (Kaoz and Kona) defeated Miami's Sweet Heat (Laurie Carlson and Lindsey Carlson) (c)	Tag team match for the No disqualification WOW World Tag Team Championship Falls Count Anywhere match	7:45
Match No.	Episode 51: Light At The End Of The Tunnel (taped on June 26, 2023, aired on September 2, 2023)	Stipulations	Times
1	Chantilly Chella defeated Tormenta (with the Atty. Sophia Lopez)	Singles match	5:40
2	The Brat Pack (BK Rhythm, Gigi Gianni and Robbie Rocket) vs. Team Spirit (Ariel Sky, Coach Campanelli and Randi Rah Rah) no contest Gigi Gianni (with BK Rhythm and Robbie Rocket) defeated Randi Rah Rah	Singles match	2:26
3	The Mother Truckers (Big Rig Betty and Holly Swag) defeated Las Bandidas (Sylvia Sanchez and Vivian Rivera) (with the Atty. Sophia Lopez and the Policeman)	Tag team match	4:18
4	Penelope Pink (c) (with Lana Star) defeated Princess Aussie	Singles match for the WOW World Championship	8:54
Episode 52: Season Recap, Championship Nights (taped on June 26, 2023, aired on September 9, 2023)
AJ Mendez, Stephen Dickey and David McLane announce all the action in this very special episode of WOW – Women Of Wrestling as the two WOW World Championship matches that the industry cannot stop talking about are showcased. Revisit the championship highlights of WOW's season of battles. We kick the weekend off with a hard hitting Tag Team Championship match as Miami's Sweet Heat, Laurie and Lindsey Carlson leaves it all in the purple ring, defending their faction's titles against The Tonga Twins, Kona and Kaoz. And in the final showdown on this special episode we will relive the spectacular Princess Aussie battling Penelope Pink for the singles WOW World Championship. Witness all of the drama and action leading up to the matches and prepare to be WOW’d by the history making outcomes.

=== List of episodes (season 9/2023-2024) ===
The series is aired on broadcast syndication and CHCH, and streaming on CW Seed, Pluto TV, Facebook and its YouTube channel.

Below are the results of the matches as aired on the TV show and approximate airdates.

Match No.	Episode 1: The Beast Returns! (taped on August 2, 2023, aired on September 16, 2023)	Stipulations	Times
1	Adriana Gambino defeated Jennifer Florez	Singles match	4:19
2	Tormenta (with the Atty. Sophia Lopez) defeated Fury	Singles match	4:31
3	Miami's Sweet Heat (Lovely Laurie Carlson and Luscious Lindsey Carlson) defeated Spring Break 24/7 (Crystal Waters and Sandy Shore)	Tag team match	4:49
4	Penelope Pink (c) (with Lana Star, Vickie Lynn McCoy, Lovely Laurie Carlson and Luscious Lindsey Carlson) defeated Chantilly Chella	Singles match for the WOW World Championship	5:50
Match No.	Episode 2: Opportunity Is Knocking (taped on August 2, 2023, aired on September 23, 2023)	Stipulations	Times
1	Princess Aussie defeated Holidead	Singles rematch	7:08
2	Kandi Krush defeated Katarina Jinx	Singles match	5:04
3	Coach Campanelli (with Ariel Sky) defeated BK Rhythm (with Gigi Gianni)	Singles match	5:05
4	The Tonga Twins (Kaoz and Kona) (c) defeated Las Bandidas (Sylvia Sanchez and Vivian Rivera) (with the Atty. Sophia Lopez)	Tag team match for the WOW World Tag Team Championship	3:32
Match No.	Episode 3: Sign The Dotted Line (taped on August 3, 2023, aired on September 30, 2023)	Stipulations	Times
1	The Beast defeated Chainsaw (with Angelica Dante)	Singles match	2:01
2	Tiki Chamorro defeated GI Jane (with Samantha Smart)	Singles match	3:33
3	Team Exile (Exodus and Genesis) (with Ice Cold) defeated Americana and Jessie Jones	Tag team match	5:06
4	Princess Aussie defeated Penelope Pink (c) (with Lana Star) defeated Tormenta (with the Atty. Sophia Lopez and the musico's)	Triple threat match for the WOW World Championship	5:44
Match No.	Episode 4: The Deal Is Off (taped on August 3, 2023, aired on October 7, 2023)	Stipulations	Times
1	The Last Call (Reina Del Rey and Wrecking Ball) defeated Jennifer Florez and Stephy Slays	Tag team rematch	4:22
2	Holidead defeated Rebel Haze	Singles match	4:56
3	The Brat Pack (BK Rhythm and Gigi Gianni) defeated Team Spirit (Ariel Sky and Coach Campanelli)	Tag team match	6:40
4	The Tonga Twins (Kaoz and Kona) (c) defeated Miami's Sweet Heat (Lovely Laurie Carlson and Luscious Lindsey Carlson) (with Lana Star) ended in a no contest	Tag team rematch for the WOW World Tag Team Championship	7:35
Match No.	Episode 5: The Flash Drive Surprise? (taped on August 4, 2023, aired on October 14, 2023)	Stipulations	Times
1	Adriana Gambino defeated Chantilly Chella	Singles match	3:39
2	Kandi Krush defeated Gloria Glitter	Singles match	6:41
3	The Mother Truckers (Big Rig Betty and Holly Swag) defeated Las Bandidas (Sylvia Sanchez and Vivian Rivera) (with the Atty. Sophia Lopez) by disqualification	Tag team rematch	2:51
4	Princess Aussie (c) defeated Penelope Pink (with Vickie Lynn McCoy and Lana Star)	Singles match for the WOW World Championship	7:43
Match No.	Episode 6: The Landscape Shifts (taped on August 4, 2023, aired on October 21, 2023)	Stipulations	Times
1	Chainsaw (with Angelica Dante) defeated Jennifer Florez	Singles match	3:18
2	Americana and Jessie Jones defeated Team Exile (Exodus and Genesis) (with Ice Cold)	Tag team rematch	4:37
3	Coach Campanelli (with Ariel Sky) defeated Gigi Gianni (with BK Rhythm)	Singles match	5:55
4	The Tonga Twins (Kaoz and Kona) (c) defeated Miami's Sweet Heat (Lovely Laurie Carlson and Luscious Lindsey Carlson)	Tag team match for the No disqualification WOW World Tag Team Championship	7:46
Match No.	Episode 7: Why, Vickie? Why? (taped on August 17, 2023, aired on October 28, 2023)	Stipulations	Times
1	The Last Call (Reina Del Rey and Wrecking Ball) defeated Spring Break 24/7 (Crystal Waters and Sandy Shore)	Tag team rematch to determine the #1 contender's for the WOW World Tag Team Championship	3:02
2	Gloria Glitter defeated Keta Rush	Singles match	4:33
3	The Mother Truckers (Big Rig Betty and Holly Swag) defeated Las Bandidas (Sylvia Sanchez and Vivian Rivera) (with the Atty. Sophia Lopez)	Tag team rematch for the No disqualification	5:15
4	The Beast vs. Vickie Lynn McCoy (with Lana Star) ended in double count out	Singles match	1:57
Match No.	Episode 8: The World's Greatest Opportunity (taped on August 17, 2023, aired on November 4, 2023)	Stipulations	Times
1	Adriana Gambino defeated Stephy Slays	Singles rematch	6:28
2	Chantilly Chella and Tiki Chamorro defeated The Brat Pack (BK Rhythm and Gigi Gianni)	Tag team match	5:18
3	Kandi Krush defeated Goldie Collins	Singles match	6:16
4	Princess Aussie (c) vs. Tormenta (with the Atty. Sophia Lopez) ended in a no contest	Singles match for the WOW World Championship	5:16
Match No.	Episode 9: Night Of Hundcuffs! (taped on August 18, 2023, aired on November 11, 2023)	Stipulations	Times
1	The Tonga Twins (Kaoz and Kona) (c) defeated The Classmaster and GI Jane (with Samantha Smart)	Tag team match for the WOW World Tag Team Championship	4:47
2	Coach Campanelli defeated Katarina Jinx	Singles match	5:07
3	Fury defeated Holidead	Singles match	5:28
4	Miami's Sweet Heat (Lovely Laurie Carlson and Luscious Lindsey Carlson) (with Penelope Pink, Vickie Lynn McCoy and Lana Star) defeated Las Bandidas (Sylvia Sanchez and Vivian Rivera) (with the Atty. Sophia Lopez)	Tag team match for the Special Stipulation (The Mother Truckers (Big Rig Betty and Holly Swag) are pleased to offer their services to WOW Owner David McLane as he strives to return order to WOW by volunteering to handcuff themselves to managers)	6:44
Match No.	Episode 10: Unsanctioned (taped on August 18, 2023, aired on November 18, 2023)	Stipulations	Times
1	Princess Aussie (c) defeated Gloria Glitter	Singles match for the WOW World Championship	5:48
2	Adriana Gambino defeated Tiki Chamorro	Singles match	3:27
3	Jessie Jones (with Americana) defeated Ice Cold (with Exodus and Genesis) by submission	Singles match	3:59
4	The Beast defeated Vickie Lynn McCoy	Singles rematch for the No disqualification Unsanctioned match Falls count anywhere match	9:26
Match No.	Episode 11: Last Call for The Tonga Twins? (taped on August 19, 2023, aired on November 25, 2023)	Stipulations	Times
1	Chainsaw (with Angelica Dante) defeated Stephy Slays	Singles rematch	3:06
2	Team Spirit (Ariel Sky and Coach Campanelli) defeated Las Bandidas (Sylvia Sanchez and Vivian Rivera) (with the Atty. Sophia Lopez)	Tag team match	5:51
3	Kandi Krush defeated The Classmaster (with Samantha Smart)	Singles match	5:22
4	The Tonga Twins (Kaoz and Kona) (c) defeated The Last Call (Reina Del Rey and Wrecking Ball)	Tag team match for the WOW World Tag Team Championship	5:30
Match No.	Episode 12: Truck Stop Justice (taped on August 19, 2023, aired on December 2, 2023)	Stipulations	Times
1	The Brat Pack (BK Rhythm and Gigi Gianni) defeated Spring Break 24/7 (Crystal Waters and Sandy Shore)	Tag team match	5:41
2	Gloria Glitter defeated Chantilly Chella	Singles match	5:16
3	Keta Rush vs. Exodus (with Genesis and Ice Cold) ended in a draw	Singles match	4:15
4	The Mother Truckers (Big Rig Betty and Holly Swag) defeated Miami's Sweet Heat (Laurie Carlson and Lindsey Carlson) (with Lana Star)	Tag team rematch	5:47
Match No.	Episode 13: The Championship Challenge (taped on August 19, 2023, aired on December 9, 2023)	Stipulations	Times
1	Genesis (with Exodus and Ice Cold) defeated Jessie Jones (with Americana)	Singles match	4:11
2	Jennifer Florez defeated The Classmaster (with Samantha Smart)	Singles match	4:33
3	Adriana Gambino defeated Rebel Haze	Singles match	5:18
4	Abilene Maverick the Governor's Daughter defeated Princess Aussie (c) defeated The Beast defeated Penelope Pink defeated Tormenta	Fatal 5-way Championship Challenge match for the WOW World Championship	8:28
Match No.	Episode 14: Everyone Wants the Champion (taped on December 11, 2023, aired on December 16, 2023)	Stipulations	Times
1	Kandi Krush defeated Exodus	Singles match	4:43
2	Miami's Sweet Heat (Lovely Laurie Carlson and Luscious Lindsey Carlson) (with Lana Star) defeated Chantilly Chella and Tiki Chamorro	Tag team match	5:30
3	Princess Aussie defeated Fury	Singles match	3:37
4	The Beast defeated Abilene Maverick the Governor's Daughter (c) by disqualification	Singles match for the WOW World Championship	3:23
Match No.	Episode 15: What's in the Box? (taped on December 11, 2023, aired on December 23, 2023)	Stipulations	Times
1	Adriana Gambino defeated Katarina Jinx	Singles match	4:04
2	Coach Campanelli (with Ariel Sky) defeated Goldie Collins	Singles match	4:02
3	The Last Call (Reina Del Rey) defeated The Mighty Mights (Spice and Sugar)	Tag team match	4:41
4	The Tonga Twins (Kaoz and Kona) (c) defeated Las Bandidas (Sylvia Sanchez and Vivian Rivera) (with the Atty. Sophia Lopez)	Tag team rematch for the WOW World Tag Team Championship	4:17
Match No.	Episode 16: Welcome Back (taped on December 11, 2023, aired on December 30, 2023)	Stipulations	Times
1	Gloria Glitter defeated Stephy Slays	Singles match	2:38
2	Holidead defeated Chainsaw (with Angelica Dante)	Singles match	3:13
3	Genesis defeated Kandi Krush	Singles match	4:42
4	The All American Girls (Americana and Santana Garrett) vs. Amber O'Neal and Jessie Jones ended in a double count out	Tag team match	6:08
Match No.	Episode 17: The WOW Factor (taped on December 11, 2023, aired on January 6, 2024)	Stipulations	Times
1	Tormenta (with the Atty. Sophia Lopez) defeated Fury	Singles rematch	3:29
2	Miami's Sweet Heat (Lovely Laurie Carlson and Luscious Lindsey Carlson) (with Lana Star) defeated The Mighty Mights (Spice and Sugar)	Tag team match	5:38
3	The Mother Truckers (Big Rig Betty and Holly Swag) defeated The Brat Pack (BK Rhythm and Gigi Gianni)	Tag team match	4:00
4	Abilene Maverick the Governor's Daughter (c) defeated Penelope Pink (with Lana Star)	Singles match for the WOW World Championship	4:01
Match No.	Episode 18: Trios Tournament Turmoil (taped on December 11, 2023, aired on January 13, 2024)	Stipulations	Times
1	Team Spirit (Ariel Sky, Coach Campanelli and Pep Riley) defeated IQ Superior (The Classmaster, The Disciplinarian and GI Jane) (with Samantha Smart)	Trios tournament turmoil quarterfinals match for the WOW World Trios Championship	5:25
2	Gloria Glitter defeated Tiki Chamorro	Singles match	5:31
3	Lil J-Boogie defeated Chantilly Chella	Singles match	5:05
4	Amber O'Neal and Jessie Jones defeated The All American Girls (Americana and Santana Garrett)	Tag team match	5:48
Match No.	Episode 19: Who Gets The Tongas? (taped on December 11, 2023, aired on January 20, 2024)	Stipulations	Times
1	Team Exile (Exodus, Genesis and Ice Cold) defeated The Mighty Mights (Spice and Sugar) and Stephy Slays	Trios tournament turmoil quarterfinals match for the WOW World Trios Championship	5:25
2	Penelope Pink (with Lana Star) defeated Kandi Krush	Singles rematch	4:50
3	The Beast defeated Tormenta (with the Atty. Sophia Lopez)	Singles rematch	2:56
4	Miami's Sweet Heat (Lovely Laurie Carlson and Luscious Lindsey Carlson) (with Lana Star) defeated Las Bandidas (Sylvia Sanchez and Vivian Rivera) (with the Atty. Sophia Lopez) defeated The Last Call (Reina Del Rey and Wrecking Ball) defeated The Mother Truckers (Big Rig Betty and Holly Swag)	Fatal 4-way match to determine the #1 contender's for the WOW World Tag Team Championship	5:16
Match No.	Episode 20: The Only I Know How to Fight (taped on December 11, 2023, aired on January 27, 2024)	Stipulations	Times
1	The Brat Pack (BK Rhythm, Gigi Gianni and Lil J-Boodie) defeated Chantilly Chella, Crystal Waters and Sandy Shore	Trios tournament turmoil quarterfinals match for the WOW World Trios Championship	4:47
2	Adriana Gambino defeated Goldie Collins	Singles match	5:10
3	Chainsaw (with Angelica Dante) defeated Fury	Singles match	4:09
4	Jessie Jones defeated Americana by submission	Singles match	4:56
Match No.	Episode 21: We Kidnapped Tiki (taped on December 11, 2023, aired on February 3, 2024)	Stipulations	Times
1	El Clan Latino (Sylvia Sanchez, Tormenta and Vivian Rivera) (with the Atty. Sophia Lopez) defeated Keta Rush and The Mighty Mights (Spice and Sugar)	Trios tournament turmoil quarterfinals match for the WOW World Trios Championship	4:39
2	Rebel Haze defeated Gloria Glitters	Singles match	5:12
3	GI Jane defeated The Classmaster defeated The Disciplinarian (with Samantha Smart)	Triple threat match for the Leader of The Pack match second command behind Samantha Smart	4:42
4	The Tonga Twins (Kaoz and Kona) (c) defeated The Last Call (Reina Del Rey and Wrecking Ball)	Tag team rematch for the WOW World Tag Team Championship	5:12
Match No.	Episode 22: Aussie Aussie Aussie Oi Oi Oi (taped on December 11, 2023, aired on February 10, 2024)	Stipulations	Times
1	Team Spirit (Ariel Sky, Pep Riley and Sasha Sparks) (with Coach Campanelli) defeated The Brat Pack (BK Rhythm, Gigi Gianni and Lil J-Boodie) ended in a no contest	Trios tournament turmoil semifinals match for the WOW World Trios Championship	4:47
2	The Mother Truckers (Big Rig Betty and Holly Swag) defeated Miami's Sweet Heat (Lovely Laurie Carlson and Luscious Lindsey Carlson) (with Lana Star, Penelope Pink and Vickie Lynn McCoy)	Tag team rematch for the No disqualification	6:46
3	Abilene Maverick the Governor's Daughter (c) defeated Princess Aussie	Singles match for the WOW World Championship	8:27
Match No.	Episode 23: Put Me in Coach (taped on December 11, 2023, aired on February 17, 2024)	Stipulations	Times
1	Team Exile (Exodus, Genesis and Ice Cold) defeated El Clan Latino (Sylvia Sanchez, Tormenta and Vivian Rivera) (with the Atty. Sophia Lopez)	Trios tournament turmoil semifinals match for the WOW World Trios Championship	4:06
2	GI Jane defeated Chainsaw (with Angelica Dante)	Singles match	3:07
3	Jessie Jones (with Amber O'Neal) defeated Santana Garrett (with Americana)	Singles match	5:23
4	Miami's Sweet Heat (Lovely Laurie Carlson and Luscious Lindsey Carlson) (with Lana Star, Penelope Pink and Vickie Lynn McCoy) defeated The Tonga Twins (Kaoz and Kona) (c)	Tag team rematch for the WOW World Tag Team Championship	5:37
Match No.	Episode 24: Be Careful What You Sow (taped on December 12, 2023, aired on February 24, 2024)	Stipulations	Times
1	Adriana Gambino defeated Princess Aussie	Singles match	5:20
2	IQ Superior (The Classmaster and The Disciplinarian) (with Samantha Smart) defeated The Heavy Metal Sisters (Fury and Rebel Haze)	Tag team match	5:36
3	Tiki Chamorro (with Kaoz and Kona) defeated Gloria Glitter	Singles rematch	4:14
4	The Mother Truckers (Big Rig Betty and Holly Swag) defeated Fabulous 4 (Penelope Pink and Vickie Lynn McCoy) (with Lana Star, Lovely Laurie Carlson and Luscious Lindsey Carlson)	Tag team match	6:22
Match No.	Episode 25: The All American Girls (taped on December 12, 2023, aired on March 2, 2024)	Stipulations	Times
1	Team Spirit (Coach Campanelli, Pep Riley and Sasha Sparks) (with Ariel Sky) defeated The Brat Pack (BK Rhythm, Gigi Gianni and Lil J-Boodie)	Trios tournament turmoil semifinals rematch for the WOW World Trios Championship	5:01
2	Holidead defeated Goldie Collins	Singles match	5:45
3	Kandi Krush defeated Ice Cold	Singles rematch	3:41
4	The All American Girls (Americana and Santana Garrett) defeated Glits & Glam (Amber O'Neal and Jessie Jones)	Tag team rematch	7:05
Match No.	Episode 26: A Very Important Main Event (taped on December 12, 2023, aired on March 9, 2024)	Stipulations	Times
1	The Mother Truckers (Big Rig Betty and Holly Swag) defeated Miami's Sweet Heat (Lovely Laurie Carlson and Luscious Lindsey Carlson) (c)	Tag team match for the No disqualification Hardcore match, for the WOW World Tag Team Championship	6:04
2	Adriana Gambino defeated Sandy Shore (with Crystal Waters)	Singles match	2:55
3	The Classmaster (with Samantha Smart) defeated Stephy Slays	Singles match	3:11
4	Abilene Maverick the Governor's Daughter (c) defeated The Beast by disqualification	Singles rematch for the WOW World Championship	4:46
Match No.	Episode 27: Finals and Follies (taped on December 12, 2023, aired on March 16, 2024)	Stipulations	Times
1	The Mother Truckers (Big Rig Betty and Holly Swag) (c) defeated IQ Superior (The Classmaster and The Disciplinarian) (with Samantha Smart)	Tag team match for the WOW World Tag Team Championship	5:41
2	The Tonga Twins (Kaoz and Kona) defeated Las Bandidas (Angel Rose and Sylvia Sanchez) (with the Atty. Sophia Lopez)	Tag team match	4:08
3	Team Spirit (Ariel Sky, Pep Riley and Sasha Sparks) (with Coach Campanelli) vs. Team Exile (Exodus, Genesis and Ice Cold) no contest Coach Campanelli, Gloria Glitter and Kandi Krush (with Ariel Sky, Pep Riley and Sasha Sparks) defeated Team Exile (Exodus, Genesis and Ice Cold)	Trios tournament turmoil finals match for the WOW World Trios Championship	6:32
Match No.	Episode 28: Dominance Declaired (taped on December 12, 2023, aired on March 23, 2024)	Stipulations	Times
1	Princess Aussie defeated Katarina Jinx	Singles match	3:26
2	Miami's Sweet Heat (Lovely Laurie Carlson and Luscious Lindsey Carlson) (with Lana Star) defeated The Heavy Metal Sisters (Fury and Rebel Haze)	Tag team match	7:37
3	Tiki Chamorro defeated Tormenta (with the Atty. Sophia Lopez)	Singles match	3:21
4	Penelope Pink (with Lana Star and Vickie Lynn McCoy) defeated GI Jane	Singles match	4:42
Match No.	Episode 29: Sky's the Limit (taped on December 12, 2023, aired on March 30, 2024)	Stipulations	Times
1	The All American Girls (Americana and Santana Garrett) defeated Team Exile (Exodus and Ice Cold) (with Genesis)	Tag team match	5:09
2	Holidead defeated BK Rhythm (with Gigi Gianni and Lil J-Boogie)	Singles match	6:34
3	The Mother Truckers (Big Rig Betty and Holly Swag) (c) defeated Animal Instinct (Goldie Collins and Katarina Jinx)	Tag team match for the WOW World Tag Team Championship	4:27
4	Top Tier (Coach Campanelli, Gloria Glitter and Kandi Krush) defeated Team Spirit (Ariel Sky, Pep Riley and Sasha Sparks)	Six-woman tag team match for the WOW World Trios Championship	5:49
Match No.	Episode 30: Injured or Insidious (taped on December 12, 2023, aired on April 6, 2024)	Stipulations	Times
1	Reina Del Rey (with Adriana Gambino) defeated Princess Aussie	Singles rematch	6:16
2	The Mighty Mights (Spice and Sugar) defeated The Brat Pack (Gigi Gianni and Lil J-Boogie) (with BK Rhythm)	Tag team match	7:15
3	Miami's Sweet Heat (Lovely Laurie Carlson and Luscious Lindsey Carlson) (with Lana Star) defeated The Dojo Defenders (Kara Kai and Tara Strike)	Tag team match	6:41
4	The Island Dynasty (Kaoz, Kona and Tiki Chamorro) defeated El Clan Latino (Angel Rose, Sylvia Sanchez and Tormenta) (with the Atty. Sophia Lopez)	Six-woman tag team match	3:28
Match No.	Episode 31: Nothing Is As It Appears (taped on December 12, 2023, aired on April 13, 2024)	Stipulations	Times
1	The Beast defeated Goldie Collins	Singles match	3:50
2	Genesis defeated Stephy Slays	Singles match	4:09
3	Chantilly Chella defeated Chainsaw (with Angelica Dante)	Singles rematch	3:45
4	Abilene Maverick the Governor's Daughter (c) vs. Americana ended in a count out	Singles match for the WOW World Championship	5:42
Match No.	Episode 32: Friend To Foe (taped on December 12, 2023, aired on April 20, 2024)	Stipulations	Times
1	Coach Campanelli defeated Ariel Sky	Singles match	4:06
2	The Classmaster (with Samantha Smart) defeated GI Jane	Singles match	4:10
3	BK Rhythm (with Gigi Gianni and Lil J-Boogie) defeated Sasha Sparks (with Pep Riley)	Singles match	4:03
4	The Mother Truckers (Big Rig Betty and Holly Swag) (c) defeated Miami's Sweet Heat (Laurie Carlson and Lindsey Carlson) (with Lana Star, Penelope Pink and Vickie Lynn McCoy) by disqualification	Tag team match for the WOW World Tag Team Championship	6:02
Match No.	Episode 33: Shattered Sisterhood (taped on December 12, 2023, aired on April 27, 2024)	Stipulations	Times
1	Abilene Maverick and Jessie Jones defeated The All American Girls (Americana and Santana Garrett)	Tag team match	4:58
2	Chantilly Chella and Holidead (with Foxxy Fierce) defeated The Monsters Of Madness (Chainsaw and Siren the Voodoo Doll) (with Angelica Dante)	Tag team match	4:28
3	Kandi Krush (with Ariel Sky, Coach Campanelli and Gloria Glitter) defeated Princess Aussie	Singles match	5:13
4	The Beast defeated Penelope Pink (with Lana Star and Vickie Lynn McCoy)	Singles match	8:55
Match No.	Episode 34: Battle Of Supremacy (taped on December 13, 2023, aired on May 4, 2024)	Stipulations	Times
1	The Mighty Mights (Spice and Sugar) and Stephy Slays defeated The Brat Pack (BK Rhythm, Gigi Gianni and Lil J-Boogie)	Six-woman tag team match	7:41
2	Exodus defeated Ice Cold (with Genesis) ended in a no contest	Singles match	4:31
3	Gloria Glitter (with Ariel Sky, Coach Campanelli and Kandi Krush) defeated Pep Riley	Singles match	3:30
4	The Island Dynasty (Kaoz, Kona and Tiki Chammoro) defeated IQ Superior (The Classmaster, The Disciplinarian and Samantha Smart)	Six-woman tag team match	4:38
Match No.	Episode 35: Facing The Boss (taped on December 13, 2023, aired on May 11, 2024)	Stipulations	Times
1	The Mother Truckers (Big Rig Betty and Holly Swag) (c) defeated Animal Instinct (Goldie Collins and Katarina Jinx)	Tag team rematch for the WOW World Tag Team Championship	4:55
2	Penelope Pink (with Lana Star and Vickie Lynn McCoy) defeated Americana	Singles match	5:25
3	Coach Campanelli (with Ariel Sky, Gloria Glitter and Kandi Krush) defeated Sasha Sparks	Singles match	3:37
4	Princess Aussie and Tormenta defeated Chainsaw and Reina Del Rey (with Adriana Gambino)	Tag team match	5:59
Match No.	Episode 36: A Long Road Back (taped on December 13, 2023, aired on May 18, 2024)	Stipulations	Times
1	The Heavy Metal Sisters (Fury and Rebel Haze) defeated Spring Break 24/7 (Crystal Waters and Sandy Shore)	Tag team match	5:25
2	Genesis defeated Exodus defeated Ice Cold	Triple threat match for the true leader of Exile	3:52
3	Miami's Sweet Heat (Laurie Carlson and Lindsey Carlson) (with Lana Star) defeated Chantilly Chella and Holidead	Tag team match	6:38
4	Santana Garrett defeated Abilene Maverick the Governor's Daughter (c) (with Jessie Jones) by disqualification	Singles match for the WOW World Championship	6:35
Match No.	Episode 37: Contracts and Chaos (taped on December 13, 2023, aired on May 25, 2024)	Stipulations	Times
1	Ariel Sky defeated Coach Campanelli (Gloria Glitter and Kandi Krush banned from ringside)	Singles rematch for a Freedom match	6:08
2	The Disciplinarian (with Samantha Smart) defeated GI Jane	Singles match	5:43
3	Goldie Collins defeated Pep Riley	Singles match	2:57
4	Princess Aussie and Tormenta defeated Las Bandidas (Angel Rose and Sylvia Sanchez) (with the Atty. Sophia Lopez)	Tag team match	7:29
Match No.	Episode 38: True Courage (taped on December 13, 2023, aired on June 1, 2024)	Stipulations	Times
1	Penelope Pink (with Lana Star and Vickie Lynn McCoy) defeated Sierra Breeze	Singles match	4:20
2	We hear a special message from an emotional the Atty. Sophia Lopez, due to stage 4 cancer, including Tormenta and former WOW World Champion, Princess Aussie with the former wow superhero and WOW World Champion, Jungle Grrrl.	Special segment	6:01
3	Keta Rush and The Mighty Mights (Spice and Sugar) defeated The Brat Pack (BK Rhythm, Gigi Gianni and Lil J-Boogie)	Six-woman tag team match	6:14
4	The Beast defeated Abilene Maverick the Governor's Daughter (c)	Singles rematch for the WOW World Championship	5:12
Match No.	Episode 39: Champions Rise (taped on December 13, 2023, aired on June 8, 2024)	Stipulations	Times
1	Ariel Sky and The Mother Truckers (Big Rig Betty and Holly Swag) defeated Top Tier (Coach Campanelli, Gloria Glitter and Kandi Krush)	Non-title Six-woman tag team match	6:44
2	Fury (with Rebel Haze) defeated GI Jane	Singles match	4:24
3	The Mighty Mights (Spice and Sugar) defeated Animal Instinct (Goldie Collins and Katarina Jinx)	Tag team match	4:33
4	The Beast and The Island Dynasty (Kaoz, Kona and Tiki Chammoro) defeated The Fabulous 4 (Laurie Carlson, Lindsey Carlson, Penelope Pink and Vickie Lynn McCoy) (with Lana Star)	Eight-woman tag team match	4:22
Match No.	Episode 40: Dangerous Divas (taped on December 13, 2023, aired on June 15, 2024)	Stipulations	Times
1	Lil J-Boogie and Stephy Slays defeated The Brat Pack (BK Rhythm and Gigi Gianni)	Tag team match	5:22
2	Chantilly Chella and Holidead defeated Las Bandidas (Angel Rose and Sylvia Sanchez)	Tag team match	6:28
3	IQ Superior (The Classmaster and The Disciplinarian) (with Samantha Smart) defeated The Dojo Defenders (Kara Kai and Tara Strike)	Tag team match	5:35
4	Tormenta defeated Reina Del Rey	Singles match	6:12
Match No.	Episode 41: New Predators (taped on December 13, 2023, aired on June 22, 2024)	Stipulations	Times
1	Chainsaw and Siren the Voodoo Doll (with Angelica Dante) defeated Spring Break 24/7 (Crystal Waters and Sandy Shore)	Tag team match	5:22
2	Ariel Sky defeated Ice Cold	Singles match	4:58
3	Keta Rush defeated Exodus	Singles match	4:06
4	Princess Aussie defeated Genesis	Singles match	6:12
Match No.	Episode 42: Outsmarting the Champion (taped on December 13, 2023, aired on June 29, 2024)	Stipulations	Times
1	Top Tier (Coach Campanelli, Gloria Glitter and Kandi Krush) defeated The Dojo Defenders (Kara Kai and Tara Strike) and Sierra Breeze	Non-title Six-woman tag team match	5:21
2	The All American Girls (Americana and Santana Garrett) defeated Las Bandidas (Angel Rose and Sylvia Sanchez)	Tag team match	5:16
3	Chantilly Chella and Holidead defeated The Heavy Metal Sisters (Fury and Rebel Haze)	Tag team match	5:49
4	The Beast (c) defeated The Classmaster (with Samantha Smart)	Singles match for the WOW World Championship	7:25
Match No.	Episode 43: Twin Turmoil (taped on December 13, 2023, aired on July 6, 2024)	Stipulations	Times
1	Penelope Pink (with Lana Star and Vickie Lynn McCoy) defeated Tiki Chamorro	Singles match	5:36
2	Lil J-Boogie defeated Ice Cold	Singles match	3:50
3	Animal Instinct (Goldie Collins and Katarina Jinx) defeated Team Spirit (Pep Riley and Sasha Sparks)	Tag team match	4:30
4	The Tonga Twins (Kaoz and Kona) defeated Miami's Sweet Heat (Lovely Laurie Carlson and Luscious Lindsey Carlson) by disqualification	Tag team match.	7:09
Match No.	Episode 44: Breaking Coach's Grip (taped on December 14, 2023, aired on July 13, 2024)	Stipulations	Times
1	The Fierce Sisters (Foxxy Fierce and Roxxy Fierce) defeated Chainsaw and Siren the Voodoo Doll (with Angelica Dante)	Tag team match	2:26
2	The Brat Pack (BK Rhythm and Gigi Gianni) vs. The Dojo Defenders (Kara Kai and Tara Strike) ended in a no contest	Tag team match	1:35
3	Ariel Sky and The All American Girls (Americana and Santana Garrett) defeated Top Tier (Coach Campanelli, Gloria Glitter and Kandi Krush)	Non-title Six-woman tag team match	5:19
4	The Mother Truckers (Big Rig Betty and Holly Swag) (c) defeated The Classmaster and Samantha Smart	Tag team match for the WOW World Tag Team Championship	5:15
Match No.	Episode 45: Championship Fury (taped on December 14, 2023, aired on July 20, 2024)	Stipulations	Times
1	Miami's Sweet Heat (Lovely Laurie Carlson and Luscious Lindsey Carlson) (with Lana Star and Vickie Lynn McCoy) defeated Princess Aussie and Tormenta (with Sophia Lopez)	Tag team match	8:59
2	Sierra Breeze defeated Fury (with Rebel Haze)	Singles match	4:29
3	Las Bandidas (Angel Rose and Sylvia Sanchez) defeated The Mighty Mights (Spice and Sugar)	Tag team match	4:08
4	The Beast (c) defeated Penelope Pink (with Lana Star and Vickie Lynn McCoy)	Singles match for the WOW World Championship	6:49
Match No.	Episode 46: Time To Shine (taped on December 14, 2023, aired on July 27, 2024)	Stipulations	Times
1	The All American Girls (Americana and Santana Garrett) defeated Animal Instinct (Goldie Collins and Katarina Jinx)	Tag team match	6:47
2	GI Jane defeated Genesis	Singles match	4:23
3	Coach Campanelli (with Gloria Glitter and Kandi Krush) defeated Lil J-Boogie	Singles match	5:30
4	The Mother Truckers (Big Rig Betty and Holly Swag) (c) defeated Las Bandidas (Angel Rose and Sylvia Sanchez)	Tag team match for the WOW World Tag Team Championship	4:10
Match No.	Episode 47: Last Superhero Standing (taped on December 14, 2023, aired on August 3, 2024)	Stipulations	Times
1	The Island Dynasty (Kaoz, Kona and Tiki Chamorro) defeated The Fabulous 4 (Lovely Laurie Carlson, Luscious Lindsey Carlson and Penelope Pink) (with Lana Star)	Six-woman tag team match	5:08
2	Kandi Krush (with Coach Campanelli and Gloria Glitter) defeated Ariel Sky	Singles match	5:43
3	The Dojo Defenders (Kara Kai and Tara Strike) defeated The Heavy Metal Sisters (Fury and Rebel Haze)	Tag team match	4:44
4	The Beast (c) defeated Tormenta (with the Atty. Sophia Lopez)	Singles match for the WOW World Championship	3:27
Match No.	Episode 48: Demonic Duo (taped on December 14, 2023, aired on August 10, 2024)	Stipulations	Times
1	The Brat Pack (BK Rhythm and Gigi Gianni) defeated Spring Break 24/7 (Crystal Waters and Sandy Shore)	Tag team match	5:56
2	Gloria Glitter (with Coach Campanelli and Kandi Krush) defeated Stephy Slays (with Ariel Sky and Lil J-Boogie)	Singles match	4:34
3	Animal Instinct (Goldie Collins and Katarina Jinx) defeated The Mighty Mights (Spice and Sugar)	Tag team match	5:44
4	The Mother Truckers (Big Rig Betty and Holly Swag) (c) defeated Chainsaw and Siren the Voodoo Doll (with Angelica Dante)	Tag team match for the WOW World Tag Team Championship	5:50
Match No.	Episode 49: Jessie's Dream (taped on December 14, 2023, aired on August 17, 2024)	Stipulations	Times
1	The Classmaster (with Samantha Smart) defeated Sierra Breeze	Singles match	4:34
2	Las Bandidas (Angel Rose and Sylvia Sanchez) defeated Team Spirit (Pep Riley and Sasha Sparks)	Tag team match	3:50
3	Princess Aussie defeated Genesis	Singles rematch	4:54
4	The Beast (c) vs. Jessie Jones did not start due to attack on the Beast	Singles match for the WOW World Championship	0:00
Match No.	Episode 50: Grudges, Embarrassment and Rematches (taped on December 14, 2023, aired on August 24, 2024)	Stipulations	Times
1	Ariel Sky, Lil J-Boogie and Stephy Slays defeated Top Tier (Coach Campanelli, Gloria Glitter and Kandi Krush)	Non-title Six-woman tag team match	4:53
2	Ice Cold defeated Fury (with Rebel Haze)	Singles match	3:31
3	The Dojo Defenders (Kara Kai and Tara Strike) defeated The Brat Pack (BK Rhythm and Gigi Gianni)	Tag team rematch	5:17
4	Reina Del Rey defeated Sandy Shore (with Crystal Waters)	Singles match	2:56
5	Penelope Pink (with Lana Star and Vickie Lynn McCoy) defeated Tormenta (with the Atty. Sophia Lopez)	Singles match	5:06
Match No.	Episode 51: Bills VS Belts (taped on December 14, 2023, aired on August 31, 2024)	Stipulations	Times
1	The Fierce Sisters (Foxxy Fierce and Roxxy Fierce) defeated The Classmaster and Chainsaw (with Samantha Smart) by disqualification	Tag team match	4:35
2	Chantilly Chella and Holidead defeated Las Bandidas (Angel Rose and Sylvia Sanchez)	Tag team match	4:23
3	Genesis defeated Katarina Jinx	Singles match	5:00
4	Miami's Sweet Heat (Lovely Laurie Carlson and Luscious Lindsey Carlson) (with Lana Star, Penelope Pink and Vickie Lynn McCoy) defeated The Mother Truckers (Big Rig Betty and Holly Swag) (c)	Tag team match for the WOW World Tag Team Championship	6:49
Match No.	Episode 52: Clash Of Fates (taped on December 14, 2023, aired on September 7, 2024)	Stipulations	Times
1	The Tonga Twins (Kaoz and Kona) defeated Animal Instinct (Goldie Collins and Katarina Jinx)	Tag team match	4:01
2	Abilene Maverick the Governor's Daughter (c) defeated The Beast by disqualification	Singles for the WOW World Championship, (rebroadcast from March 9, 2024)	4:46
3	Santana Garrett (with Americana) defeated The Classmaster (with Samantha Smart)	Singles match	5:43
4	The Mother Truckers (Big Rig Betty and Holly Swag) defeated Miami's Sweet Heat (Lovely Laurie Carlson and Luscious Lindsey Carlson) (c)	No disqualification Hardcore tag team match for the WOW World Tag Team Championship, (rebroadcast from March 9, 2024)	6:04

=== List of episodes (season 10/2024-2025) ===
The series is aired on broadcast syndication and CHCH, and streaming on CW Seed, Pluto TV, Facebook and its YouTube channel.

Below are the results of the matches as aired on the TV show and approximate airdates.

Match No.	Episode 1: Beast or Bust (taped on August 2, 2024, aired on September 14, 2024)	Stipulations	Times
1	Top Tier (Coach Campanelli, Gloria Glitter and Kandi Krush) (c) defeated Chantilly Chella, Holidead and the Island Girl Kalaki	Six-woman tag team match for the WOW World Trios Championship	6:22
2	Fury defeated Ice Cold	Singles rematch	4:20
3	Animal Instinct (Goldie Collins and Katarina Jinx) defeated The Mighty Mights (Spice and Sugar)	Tag team match	4:49
4	Penelope Pink (with Lana Star) defeated Princess Aussie	Singles match to determine the #1 contender for the WOW World Championship	5:49
Match No.	Episode 2: Big Opportunities (taped on August 2, 2024, aired on September 21, 2024)	Stipulations	Times
1	The Dojo Defenders (Kara Kai and Tara Strike) defeated The Brat Pack (BK Rhythm and Gigi Gianni)	Tag team rematch	4:55
2	The Classmaster (with Samantha Smart) defeated Roxxy Fierce (with Foxxy Fierce)	Singles match	5:46
3	Tormenta defeated Sylvia Sanchez	Singles match	2:45
4	Miami's Sweet Heat (Lovely Laurie Carlson and Luscious Lindsey Carlson) (with Lana Star and Penelope Pink) (c) vs. The All American Girls (Americana and Santana Garrett) no contest Miami's Sweet Heat (Lovely Laurie Carlson and Luscious Lindsey Carlson) (with Lana Star and Penelope Pink) (c) defeated The Mother Truckers (Big Rig Betty and Holly Swag)	Tag team match for the WOW World Tag Team Championship	6:27
Match No.	Episode 3: 10,000 Reasons To Talk (taped on August 2, 2024, aired on September 28, 2024)	Stipulations	Times
1	The Monsters Of Madness (Chainsaw and Siren the Voodoo Doll) (with Angelica Dante) defeated The All American Girls (Americana and Santana Garrett)	Tag team match	4:56
2	Genesis defeated Foxxy Fierce (with Roxxy Fierce)	Singles match	4:28
3	Penelope Pink (with Lana Star) defeated Jessie Jones	Singles match	6:55
Match No.	Episode 4: Jessie's World (taped on August 2, 2024, aired on October 5, 2024)	Stipulations	Times
1	Top Tier (Coach Campanelli, Gloria Glitter and Kandi Krush) (c) defeated Keta Rush and The Mighty Mights (Spice and Sugar)	Six-woman tag team match for the WOW World Trios Championship	5:17
2	Reina Del Rey (with Adriana Gambino) defeated Pep Riley	Singles match	2:53
3	Fury defeated the Island Girl Kalaki	Singles match	4:33
4	Miami's Sweet Heat (Lovely Laurie Carlson and Luscious Lindsey Carlson) (with Lana Star) (c) defeated Princess Aussie and Tormenta	Tag team match for the WOW World Tag Team Championship	9:51
Match No.	Episode 5: A Little Pink Elbow Grease (taped on August 2, 2024, aired on October 12, 2024)	Stipulations	Times
1	Chantilly Chella and Holidead defeated Animal Instinct (Goldie Collins and Katarina Jinx)	Tag team match	7:37
2	Genesis defeated Brittany Bay	Singles match	3:14
3	The Brat Pack (BK Rhythm and Gigi Gianni) (with Adriana Gambino and Reina Del Rey) defeated The All American Girls (Americana and Santana Garrett)	Tag team match	5:47
4	Chainsaw and Siren the Voodoo Doll (with Angelica Dante) defeated The Mother Truckers (Big Rig Betty and Holly Swag)	Tag team match	6:44
Match No.	Episode 6: Second Chances (taped on August 2, 2024, aired on October 19, 2024)	Stipulations	Times
1	Top Tier (Coach Campanelli, Gloria Glitter and Kandi Krush) (c) defeated The Fierce Sisters (Foxxy Fierce and Roxxy Fierce) and Tiki Chamorro	Six-woman tag team match for the WOW World Trios Championship	7:09
2	The Classmaster (with Samantha Smart) defeated Ashley Blaze	Singles match	4:37
3	The Dojo Defenders (Kara Kai and Tara Strike) defeated Fury and Sylvia Sanchez	Tag team match	6:25
4	Jessie Jones defeated Penelope Pink (with Lana Star)	Tag team match	6:30
Match No.	Episode 7: Who Attack The Beast? (taped on August 2, 2024, aired on October 26, 2024)	Stipulations	Times
1	Princess Aussie and Tormenta defeated Animal Instinct (Goldie Collins and Katarina Jinx)	Tag team match	4:29
2	The Brat Pack (BK Rhythm and Gigi Gianni) defeated Pep Riley and Tiki Chamorro	Tag team match	3:11
3	Chainsaw (with Angelica Dante) defeated Brittany Bay	Singles match	3:25
4	Miami's Sweet Heat (Lovely Laurie Carlson and Luscious Lindsey Carlson) (with Lana Star) (c) defeated The Mighty Mights (Spice and Sugar)	Tag team match for the WOW World Tag Team Championship	6:24
Match No.	Episode 8: The Cost of Freedom (taped on August 2, 2024, aired on November 2, 2024)	Stipulations	Times
1	The Dojo Defenders (Kara Kai and Tara Strike) defeated Top Tier (Gloria Glitter and Kandi Krush) (with Coach Campanelli)	Tag team match	5:35
2	Holly Swag defeated Siren the Voodoo Doll	Singles match	3:48
3	Fury, Genesis and Sylvia Sanchez defeated Chantilly Chella, the Island Girl Kalaki and Holidead	Six-woman tag team match	5:01
4	The Classmaster (with Samantha Smart) defeated Santana Garrett	Singles match	5:51
Match No.	Episode 9: Where Do You Belong, Holly Swag? (taped on August 2, 2024, aired on November 9, 2024)	Stipulations	Times
1	Xena Phoenix defeated Scout Parker by submission	Singles match	3:53
2	Animal Instinct (Goldie Collins and Katarina Jinx) defeated The Fierce Sisters (Foxxy Fierce and Roxxy Fierce)	Tag team match	5:48
3	Reina Del Rey (with Adriana Gambino, BK Rhythm and Gigi Gianni) defeated Tiki Chamorro	Six-woman tag team match	4:02
4	Miami's Sweet Heat (Lovely Laurie Carlson and Luscious Lindsey Carlson) (with Lana Star and Penelope Pink) defeated Big Rig Betty and Jessie Jones	Tag team match for custody of Holly Swag	8:08
Match No.	Episode 10: An Even Fabber Four (taped on August 3, 2024, aired on November 16, 2024)	Stipulations	Times
1	Holly Swag (with Lana Star, Lovely Laurie Carlson and Luscious Lindsey Carlson) defeated Ashley Blaze	Singles match	4:46
2	Coach Campanelli (with Gloria Glitter and Kandi Krush) defeated Valentina Diamante	Singles match	3:26
3	Princess Aussie and Tormenta defeated Chainsaw and Siren the Voodoo Doll (with Angelica Dante)	Tag team match	6:08
4	Penelope Pink (with Lana Star, Holly Swag, Lovely Laurie Carlson and Luscious Lindsey Carlson) defeated Santana Garrett	Singles match	8:09
Match No.	Episode 11: A Smart Main Event (taped on August 3, 2024, aired on November 23, 2024)	Stipulations	Times
1	The Alliance (BK Rhythm, Gigi Gianni and Reina Del Rey) (with Adriana Gambino) defeated The Mighty Mights (Spice and Sugar) and Keta Rush	Six-woman tag team match	5:34
2	Chantilly Chella, Holidead and the Island Girl Kalaki defeated Fury, Genesis and Sylvia Sanchez	Six-woman tag team rematch	5:21
3	The Fierce Sisters (Foxxy Fierce and Roxxy Fierce) defeated Animal Instinct (Goldie Collins and Katarina Jinx)	Tag team rematch	4:20
4	The Classmaster (with Samantha Smart) vs. The Beast no contest The Classmaster (with Samantha Smart) defeated Santana Garrett	Singles rematch	5:59
5	The Beast, in a video from her home, announced that she is quitting WOW.	Special segment	1:50
Match No.	Episode 12: Shockwaves (taped on August 3, 2024, aired on November 30, 2024)	Stipulations	Times
1	David McLane declares the WOW World Championship vacant and announces a 12-person battle royal to crown a new champion.	Special segment	1:35
2	Xena Phoenix defeated Magnificent Miranda Mirage by submission	Singles qualifying match for WOW World Championship Battle Royal	4:43
3	Top Tier (Coach Campanelli, Gloria Glitter and Kandi Krush) (c) defeated The Dojo Defenders (Kara Kai and Tara Strike) and Valentina Diamante	Six-woman tag team match for the WOW World Trios Championship	5:27
4	Vicious Veronica VaRoom defeated Tiki Chamorro	Singles match	3:04
5	Big Rig Betty and Jessie Jones defeated Miami's Sweet Heat (Lovely Laurie Carlson and Luscious Lindsey Carlson) (with Lana Star and Holly Swag) (c)	Tag team match for the WOW World Tag Team Championship	8:12
Match No.	Episode 13: All Eyes on Gold (taped on August 3, 2024, aired on December 7, 2024)	Stipulations	Times
1	Santana Garrett defeated Fury	Singles qualifying match for WOW World Championship Battle Royal	5:34
2	Tormenta defeated Siren the Voodoo Doll (with Angelica Dante)	Singles qualifying match for WOW World Championship Battle Royal	3:35
3	Holly Swag (with Lana Star) defeated Gigi Gianni (with BK Rhythm)	Singles qualifying match for WOW World Championship Battle Royal	4:42
4	Penelope Pink (with Lana Star) defeated Roxxy Fierce	Singles qualifying match for WOW World Championship Battle Royal	7:19
Match No.	Episode 14: Instinct for Victory (taped on August 3, 2024, aired on December 14, 2024)	Stipulations	Times
1	Gloria Glitter and Kandi Krush (with Coach Campanelli) defeated Tiki Chamorro and Pep Riley (with Lil-J Boogie)	Tag team match	4:36
2	Genesis defeated Ashley Blaze	Singles qualifying match for WOW World Championship Battle Royal	4:55
3	Xena Phoenix defeated Vicious Veronica VaRoom by submission	Singles match	3:54
4	Big Rig Betty and Jessie Jones (c) defeated Animal Instinct (Goldie Collins and Katarina Jinx) by disqualification after interference from Miami's Sweet Heat	Tag team match for the WOW World Tag Team Championship	5:37
Match No.	Episode 15: Everything to Prove (taped on August 3, 2024, aired on December 21, 2024)	Stipulations	Times
1	Reina Del Rey (with Adriana Gambino, BK Rhythm and Gigi Gianni) defeated Foxxy Fierce	Singles qualifying match for WOW World Championship Battle Royal	4:11
2	The Environmentalists (Sprout Greens and Scout Parker) defeated The Mighty Mights (Spice and Sugar)	Tag team match	5:11
3	Holly Swag (with Lana Star) defeated BK Rhythm	Singles match	4:38
4	Miami's Sweet Heat (Lovely Laurie Carlson and Luscious Lindsey Carlson) (with Lana Star) defeated The Dojo Defenders (Kara Kai and Tara Strike)	Tag team match	5:05
Match No.	Episode 16: A Daisy for Luck (taped on August 3, 2024, aired on December 28, 2024)	Stipulations	Times
1	Chantilly Chella defeated Gloria Glitter (with Coach Campanelli and Kandi Krush)	Singles qualifying match for WOW World Championship Battle Royal	5:18
2	Princess Aussie defeated Fury	Singles qualifying match for WOW World Championship Battle Royal	5:36
3	Holidead defeated Chainsaw (with Angelica Dante) via disqualification	Singles qualifying match for WOW World Championship Battle Royal	3:36
4	Tormenta defeated The Classmaster (with Samantha Smart)	Singles match	4:46
Match No.	Episode 17: Three's a Crowd? (taped on August 3, 2024, aired on January 4, 2025)	Stipulations	Times
1	Paola Mayfield the Colombian GOAT (with Abilene Maverick) defeated Ashley Blaze	Singles qualifying match for WOW World Championship Battle Royal	5:37
2	The Brat Pack (BK Rhythm and Gigi Gianni) defeated Brittany Bay and Tiki Chamorro	Tag team match	4:42
3	Coach Campanelli and Kandi Krush (with Gloria Glitter) defeated The Mighty Mights (Spice and Sugar)	Tag team match	5:50
4	Big Rig Betty and Jessie Jones (c) defeated Animal Instinct (Goldie Collins and Katarina Jinx) and Miami's Sweet Heat (Lovely Laurie Carlson and Luscious Lindsey Carlson) (with Lana Star)	Triple threat match for the WOW World Tag Team Championship	7:17
Match No.	Episode 18: A Historic WOW Battle Royal (taped on August 3, 2024, aired on January 11, 2025)	Stipulations	Times
1	The Dojo Defenders (Kara Kai and Tara Strike) defeated The Environmentalists (Sprout Greens and Scout Parker)	Tag team match	4:42
2	Magnificent Miranda Mirage (with Siren the Voodoo Doll) defeated Pep Riley	Singles match	4:06
3	The Classmaster won by last eliminating Tormenta (Note: Participants of the battle royal for the vacant WOW World Championship: Chantilly Chella, Genesis, Holidead, Holly Swag, Paola Mayfield the Colombian GOAT, Penelope Pink, Princess Aussie, Reina Del Rey, Santana Garrett, and Xena Phoenix.)	Battle royal for the vacant WOW World Championship	12:39
Match No.	Episode 19: Class Now in Session (taped on August 8, 2024, aired on January 18, 2025)	Stipulations	Times
1	Top Tier (Coach Campanelli, Gloria Glitter and Kandi Krush) (c) defeated The Dojo Defenders (Kara Kai and Tara Strike) and Xena Phoenix	Six-woman tag team match for the WOW World Trios Championship	5:49
2	Genesis defeated Tormenta	Singles match	4:39
3	Holidead defeated Reina Del Rey (with Adriana Gambino, BK Rhythm and Gigi Gianni) via disqualification after interference from The Alliance	Singles match	4:38
4	Penelope Pink (with Holly Swag and Lana Star) defeated Ashley Blaze	Singles match	6:25
Match No.	Episode 20: Loser Eats Dog Food (taped on August 8, 2024, aired on January 25, 2025)	Stipulations	Times
1	Miami's Sweet Heat (Lovely Laurie Carlson and Luscious Lindsey Carlson) (with Lana Star) defeated Chantilly Chella and the Island Girl Kalaki	Tag team match	6:38
2	The Fierce Sisters (Foxxy Fierce and Roxxy Fierce) defeated The Brat Pack (BK Rhythm and Gigi Gianni)	Tag team match	4:49
3	Chainsaw (with Angelica Dante) defeated Crystal Waters	Singles match	3:06
4	Big Rig Betty and Jessie Jones (c) defeated Animal Instinct (Goldie Collins and Katarina Jinx)	Non-title tag team match (loser eats dog food)	5:21
Match No.	Episode 21: Championship Demands (taped on August 8, 2024, aired on February 1, 2025)	Stipulations	Times
1	Paola Mayfield the Colombian GOAT (with Abilene Maverick) defeated Santana Garrett	Singles match	5:22
2	Holly Swag and Penelope Pink (with Lana Star) defeated The Dojo Defenders (Kara Kai and Tara Strike)	Tag team match	5:23
3	Ashley Blaze defeated Scout Parker	Singles match	4:43
4	The Classmaster (c) (with Samantha Smart) defeated Princess Aussie	Singles match for the WOW World Championship	7:25
Match No.	Episode 22: Dolls and Playthings (taped on August 8, 2024, aired on February 8, 2025)	Stipulations	Times
1	Genesis defeated Xena Phoenix	Singles match	5:06
2	Fury and Magnificent Miranda Mirage (with Siren the Voodoo Doll) defeated The Mighty Mights (Spice and Sugar)	Tag team match	4:36
3	Vicious Veronica VaRoom defeated Pep Riley	Singles match	3:15
4	Miami's Sweet Heat (Lovely Laurie Carlson and Luscious Lindsey Carlson) (with Lana Star) defeated Chantilly Chella and Roxxy Fierce	Tag team match	6:19
Match No.	Episode 23: Lots of Bark, Lots of Bite (taped on August 8, 2024, aired on February 15, 2025)	Stipulations	Times
1	Top Tier (Coach Campanelli, Gloria Glitter and Kandi Krush) (c) defeated The Dojo Defenders (Kara Kai and Tara Strike) and Ashley Blaze	Six-woman tag team match for the WOW World Trios Championship	5:19
2	Keta Rush defeated Scout Parker	Singles match	4:11
3	The Alliance (BK Rhythm, Gigi Gianni and Reina Del Rey) (with Adriana Gambino) defeated Chantilly Chella, Holidead and the Island Girl Kalaki via disqualification	Six-woman tag team match	5:23
4	Big Rig Betty and Jessie Jones (c) defeated Animal Instinct (Goldie Collins and Katarina Jinx)	Non-title dog collar tag team match	5:50
Match No.	Episode 24: Call Me Daisy Lane (taped on August 8, 2024, aired on February 22, 2025)	Stipulations	Times
1	Princess Aussie and Tormenta defeated Miami's Sweet Heat (Lovely Laurie Carlson and Luscious Lindsey Carlson)	Tag team match	6:45
2	Chainsaw and Pep Riley defeated The Mighty Mights (Spice and Sugar)	Tag team match. After the match, Pep Riley renamed herself Daisy Lane	3:45
3	Holly Swag and Penelope Pink (with Lana Star) defeated Chantilly Chella and Roxxy Fierce	Tag team match	5:33
4	Santana Garrett defeated Paola Mayfield the Colombia GOAT	Singles match, Abilene Maverick banned from ringside	7:28
Match No.	Episode 25: Top Tier Terrors (taped on August 8, 2024, aired on March 1, 2025)	Stipulations	Times
1	Xena Phoenix defeated BK Rhythm (with Gigi Gianni)	Singles match	4:29
2	Kara Kai and Ashley Blaze defeated Animal Instinct (Goldie Collins and Katarina Jinx)	Tag team match	4:19
3	Chainsaw (with Daisy Lane) defeated Tiki Chamorro	Singles match	3:17
4	Top Tier (Coach Campanelli, Gloria Glitter and Kandi Krush) (c) defeated Spring Break 24/7 (Brittany Bay, Crystal Waters and Sandy Shore)	Non-title Six-woman tag team match	5:31
Match No.	Episode 26: Who's Fabbest of the Four? (taped on August 8, 2024, aired on March 8, 2025)	Stipulations	Times
1	Miami's Sweet Heat (Lovely Laurie Carlson and Luscious Lindsey Carlson) defeated Princess Aussie and Tormenta	Tag team match	6:53
2	Gigi Gianni (with BK Rhythm) defeated Chantilly Chella	Singles match	3:57
3	Genesis defeated Roxxy Fierce	Singles match	4:38
4	Big Rig Betty and Jessie Jones (c) defeated Holly Swag and Penelope Pink (with Lana Star) via disqualification	Tag team match for the WOW World Tag Team Championship	9:44
Match No.	Episode 27: A Classy World Title Match (taped on August 8, 2024, aired on March 15, 2025)	Stipulations	Times
1	Paola Mayfield the Colombian GOAT (with Abilene Maverick defeated Catalina Speed (with the Atty. Sophia Lopez)	Singles match	3:26
2	Ashley Blaze and Kara Kai defeated Fury and Magnificent Miranda Mirage	Tag team match	3:42
3	Xena Phoenix defeated Scout Parker	Singles match	3:52
4	The Classmaster (c) (with Samantha Smart) defeated Santana Garrett	Singles match for the WOW World Championship	7:42
Match No.	Episode 28: Whatcha Gonna Do About It Momma (taped on August 9, 2024, aired on March 22, 2025)	Stipulations	Times
1	Miami's Sweet Heat (Lovely Laurie Carlson and Luscious Lindsey Carlson) defeated Animal Instinct (Goldie Collins and Katarina Jinx)	Tag team match	6:17
2	The Alliance (BK Rhythm, Gigi Gianni and Reina Del Rey) (with Adriana Gambino) defeated Spring Break 24/7 (Brittany Bay, Crystal Waters and Sandy Shore)	Tag team match	5:16
3	Chainsaw and Daisy Lane defeated Tiki Chamorro and the Island Girl Kalaki	Tag team match	4:27
4	Big Rig Betty (with Jessie Jones defeated Holly Swag (with Lana Star and Penelope Pink)	Singles match	7:01
Match No.	Episode 29: You Want It, You Earn It (taped on August 9, 2024, aired on March 29, 2025)	Stipulations	Times
1	Paola Mayfield the Colombian GOAT (with Abilene Maverick) defeated Chantilly Chella	Singles match	5:16
2	Holidead defeated Sylvia Sanchez	Singles match	3:20
3	The Classmaster (c) (with Samantha Smart) defeated Genesis	Non-title singles match	6:09
4	Ashley Blaze, Kara Kai and Xena Phoenix defeated Top Tier (Coach Campanelli, Gloria Glitter and Kandi Krush) (c)	Non-title revenge Six-woman tag team match	6:25
Match No.	Episode 30: Well, Four's Definitely A Crowd (taped on August 9, 2024, aired on April 5, 2025)	Stipulations	Times
1	Animal Instinct (Goldie Collins and Katarina Jinx) defeated Keta Rush and Sugar	Tag team match	3:35
2	Fury defeated Catalina Speed (with the Atty. Sophia Lopez)	Singles match	3:32
3	Santana Garrett defeated Scout Parker	Singles match	3:42
4	Penelope Pink and Holly Swag (with Lana Star) defeated Big Rig Betty and Jessie Jones (c) vs. Miami's Sweet Heat (Lovely Laurie Carlson and Luscious Lindsey Carlson) vs. Princess Aussie and Tormenta	Fatal Four-Way tag team match for the WOW World Tag Team Championship	10:36
Match No.	Episode 31: The GOAT's Gamble (taped on August 9, 2024, aired on April 12, 2025)	Stipulations	Times
1	Chantilly Chella, Holidead and the Island Girl Kalaki defeated The Alliance (BK Rhythm, Gigi Gianni and Reina Del Rey) (with Adriana Gambino)	Six-woman tag team match	5:21
2	Chainsaw (with Daisy Lane) defeated Roxxy Fierce	Singles match	3:06
3	Top Tier (Coach Campanelli and Kandi Krush) (with Gloria Glitter) defeated Kara Kai and Xena Phoenix (with Ashley Blaze)	Tag team match	5:57
4	The Classmaster (c) (with Samantha Smart) defeated Paola Mayfield the Colombian GOAT (with Abilene Maverick) via disqualification	Singles match for WOW World Championship	7:09
Match No.	Episode 32: Family Feud: Championship Edition (taped on August 9, 2024, aired on April 19, 2025)	Stipulations	Times
1	Santana Garrett defeated Genesis	Singles match	6:56
2	Animal Instinct (Goldie Collins and Katarina Jinx) defeated Tiki Chamorro and the Island Girl Kalaki	Tag team match	5:14
3	Scout Parker defeated Valentina Diamante	Singles match	1:56
4	Penelope Pink and Holly Swag (with Lana Star) (c) defeated Big Rig Betty and Jessie Jones	Tag team match for the WOW World Tag Team Championship	8:54
Match No.	Episode 33: Sweet Heat's Revenge (taped on August 9, 2024, aired on April 26, 2025)	Stipulations	Times
1	The Classmaster (c) (with Samantha Smart) defeated Spring Break 24/7 (Brittany Bay, Crystal Waters and Sandy Shore)	Non-title 3-on-1 superior match	3:18
2	The Brat Pack (BK Rhythm and Gigi Gianni) (with Adriana Gambino and Reina Del Rey) defeated Keta Rush and Sugar	Tag team match	3:59
3	Kara Kai defeated Sylvia Sanchez	Singles match	5:14
4	Princess Aussie and Tormenta defeated Miami's Sweet Heat (Lovely Laurie Carlson and Luscious Lindsey Carlson)	Tag team match to determine the #1 contender for the WOW World Tag Team Championship	8:18
Match No.	Episode 34: Three's Not Company (taped on August 9, 2024, aired on May 3, 2025)	Stipulations	Times
1	Xena Phoenix defeated Coach Campanelli (with Gloria Glitter and Kandi Krush)	Singles match	4:50
2	Chainsaw and Daisy Lane defeated Chantilly Chella and Roxxy Fierce	Tag team match	5:23
3	Fury defeated Holidead	Singles match	5:46
4	Paola Mayfield the Colombian GOAT (with Abilene Maverick) and Santana Garrett defeated Genesis	Triple threat match to determine the #1 contender for the WOW World Championship	7:57
Match No.	Episode 35: Tricks and Titles (taped on August 9, 2024, aired on May 10, 2025)	Stipulations	Times
1	Kara Kai defeated Kandi Krush (with Coach Campanelli and Gloria Glitter)	Singles match	5:10
2	Scout Parker defeated Sugar	Singles match	3:32
3	Penelope Pink and Holly Swag (with Lana Star) (c) defeated Princess Aussie and Tormenta	Tag team match for the WOW World Tag Team Championship	12:52
Match No.	Episode 36: Wicked Sisterhoods (taped on August 9, 2024, aired on May 17, 2025)	Stipulations	Times
1	The Classmaster (c) defeated Reina Del Rey (with Adriana Gambino, BK Rhythm and Gigi Gianni)	Non-title singles match	5:57
2	Gloria Glitter (with Coach Campanelli and Kandi Krush) defeated Sugar	Singles match	3:14
3	Chainsaw, Daisy Lane and Fury defeated Chantilly Chella, Roxxy Fierce and Holidead	Six-woman tag team match	5:02
4	Paola Mayfield the Colombian GOAT (with Abilene Maverick) defeated Santana Garrett	Singles match to determine the #1 contender for the WOW World Championship	5:21
Match No.	Episode 37: Twin vs. Twin (taped on August 16, 2024, aired on May 24, 2025)	Stipulations	Times
1	Big Rig Betty and Jessie Jones defeated The Brat Pack (BK Rhythm and Gigi Gianni) (with Adriana Gambino and Reina Del Rey)	Tag team match	9:28
2	Genesis defeated Scout Parker	singles match	4:27
3	Lovely Laurie Carlson vs. Luscious Lindsey Carlson ended in a no contest	Singles match	7:20
Match No.	Episode 38: Cuffed Chaos (taped on August 16, 2024, aired on May 31, 2025)	Stipulations	Times
1	Top Tier (Coach Campanelli, Gloria Glitter and Kandi Krush) (c) defeated Kara Kai, Xena Phoenix and Sugar (with Ashley Blaze)	Six-woman tag team match for the WOW World Trios Championship	6:47
2	Santana Garrett defeated Sylvia Sanchez	Singles match	3:46
3	Chainsaw, Daisy Lane and Fury defeated Spring Break 24/7 (Brittany Bay, Crystal Waters and Sandy Shore)	Six-woman tag team match	1:33
4	The Classmaster (c) (with Samantha Smart) defeated Paola Mayfield the Colombian GOAT (with Abilene Maverick)	Singles match for the WOW World Championship; Smart and Maverick were handcuffed together	8:47
Match No.	Episode 39: Rookies, Rivals and Royalty (taped on August 16, 2024, aired on June 7, 2025)	Stipulations	Times
1	Genesis defeated Princess Aussie	Singles match	6:11
2	Chantilly Chella and Roxxy Fierce defeated Animal Instinct (Goldie Collins and Katarina Jinx)	Tag team match	5:33
3	Xena Phoenix defeated Vicious Veronica VaRoom	Singles match	3:25
4	Santana Garrett defeated Reina Del Rey (with Adriana Gambino, BK Rhythm and Gigi Gianni)	Singles match	7:06
Match No.	Episode 40: Deceitful Divas (taped on August 16, 2024, aired on June 14, 2025)	Stipulations	Times
1	Tormenta defeated Sylvia Sanchez	Singles match	4:07
2	The Brat Pack (BK Rhythm and Gigi Gianni) defeated Tiki Chamorro and the Island Girl Kalaki	Tag team match	6:38
3	Fury defeated Sandy Shore (with Brittany Bay)	Singles match	3:49
4	Miami's Sweet Heat (Lovely Laurie Carlson and Luscious Lindsey Carlson) defeated Penelope Pink and Holly Swag (with Lana Star) (c) by disqualification	Tag team match for the WOW World Tag Team Championship	6:33
Match No.	Episode 41: Class Is In Session (taped on August 16, 2024, aired on June 21, 2025)	Stipulations	Times
1	Top Tier (Coach Campanelli, Gloria Glitter and Kandi Krush) (c) defeated Brittany Bay, Chantilly Chella and Roxxy Fierce	Non-title Six-woman tag team match	5:49
2	Kara Kai defeated Scout Parker	Singles match	4:26
3	Chainsaw (with Daisy Lane) defeated Magnificent Miranda Mirage	Singles match	3:03
4	Santana Garrett defeated The Classmaster (c) (with Samantha Smart) via disqualification	Singles match for the WOW World Championship	8:28
Match No.	Episode 42: Brazilian Blowout (taped on August 16, 2024, aired on June 28, 2025)	Stipulations	Times
1	Fury defeated Gabriella Cruz	Singles match	4:41
2	The Alliance (BK Rhythm, Gigi Gianni and Reina Del Rey) (with Adriana Gambino) defeated The Mighty Mights (Spice and Sugar) and Holidead	Six-woman tag team match	6:12
3	Xena Phoenix defeated Goldie Collins	Singles match	2:56
4	Tormenta defeated Paola Mayfield the Colombian GOAT (with Abilene Maverick) defeated Genesis defeated Princess Aussie	Fatal Four-Way singles match to determine the #1 contender for the WOW World Championship	7:37
Match No.	Episode 43: Hardcore Rivalry (taped on August 16, 2024, aired on July 5, 2025)	Stipulations	Times
1	Katarina Jinx defeated Kara Kai	Singles match	4:43
2	Chainsaw and Daisy Lane defeated The Environmentalists (Sprout Greens and Scout Parker)	Tag team match	5:13
3	Penelope Pink and Holly Swag (with Lana Star) (c) vs. Miami's Sweet Heat (Lovely Laurie Carlson and Luscious Lindsey Carlson) ended in a no contest	Hardcore tag-team match for the WOW World Tag Team Championship	10:30
Match No.	Episode 44: Nashville Knockout (taped on August 16, 2024, aired on July 12, 2025)	Stipulations	Times
1	Santana Garrett defeated Holidead	Singles match	6:12
2	Nikki Nashville defeated Fury	Singles match	4:20
3	Top Tier (Coach Campanelli, Gloria Glitter and Kandi Krush) (c) defeated Tiki Chamorro, the Island Girl Kalaki and Sandy Shore	Non-title Six-woman tag team match	6:47
4	Paola Mayfield the Colombian GOAT (with Abilene Maverick) vs. Princess Aussie no contest Princess Aussie defeated Genesis	Singles match	6:09
Match No.	Episode 45: Picket Line Payback (taped on August 16, 2024, aired on July 19, 2025)	Stipulations	Times
1	Sylvia Sanchez defeated Gabriella Cruz	Singles match	4:48
2	Big Rig Betty and Jessie Jones defeated The Environmentalists (Sprout Greens and Scout Parker)	Tag team match	4:17
3	The Mighty Mights (Spice and Sugar) defeated Animal Instinct (Goldie Collins and Katarina Jinx)	Tag team match	4:13
4	Tormenta defeated The Classmaster (c) (with Samantha Smart)	Singles match for the WOW World Championship	9:53
Match No.	Episode 46: Gold Standard (taped on August 17, 2024, aired on July 26, 2025)	Stipulations	Times
1	Chainsaw (with Daisy Lane) defeated Vicious Veronica VaRoom	Singles match	3:13
2	Miami's Sweet Heat (Lovely Laurie Carlson and Luscious Lindsey Carlson) defeated Animal Instinct (Goldie Collins and Katarina Jinx)	Tag team match	7:02
3	Tormenta (c) vs. Reina Del Rey (with Adriana Gambino, Gigi Gianni and BK Rhythm) ends in no contest due to shoulder injury to Tormenta	Singles match for the WOW World Championship	6:26
Match No.	Episode 47: All-American Return (taped on August 17, 2024, aired on August 2, 2025)	Stipulations	Times
1	Tiki Chamorro and the Island Girl Kalaki defeated The Brat Pack (BK Rhythm and Gigi Gianni)	Tag team match	5:22
2	Xena Phoenix defeated Fury	Singles match	2:39
3	Americana defeated Scout Parker (with Sprout Greens)	Singles match	3:57
4	Top Tier (Coach Campanelli, Gloria Glitter and Kandi Krush) (c) defeated Chantilly Chella, Gabriella Cruz and Kara Kai	Non-title Six-woman tag team match	6:45
Match No.	Episode 48: Lumberjacks and Comebacks (taped on August 17, 2024, aired on August 9, 2025)	Stipulations	Times
1	Nikki Nashville defeated Sylvia Sanchez	Singles match	4:30
2	Animal Instinct (Goldie Collins and Katarina Jinx) defeated The Mighty Mights (Spice and Sugar)	Tag team match	3:42
3	The Classmaster (with Samantha Smart) defeated Holidead	Singles match	5:49
4	Penelope Pink and Holly Swag (with Lana Star) (c) vs. Miami's Sweet Heat (Lovely Laurie Carlson and Luscious Lindsey Carlson) ended in a no contest	Lumberjack tag team match for the WOW World Tag Team Championship	6:44
Match No.	Episode 49: Girls and Dolls (taped on August 17, 2024, aired on August 16, 2025)	Stipulations	Times
1	Gabriella Cruz defeated BK Rhythm (with Gigi Gianni)	Singles match	4:07
2	The Environmentalists (Sprout Greens and Scout Parker) defeated Big Rig Betty and Jessie Jones	Tag team match	6:07
3	Top Tier (Coach Campanelli, Gloria Glitter and Kandi Krush) (c) defeated Chainsaw, Daisy Lane and Fury	Six-woman tag team match for the WOW World Trios Championship	5:35
4	Santana Garrett defeated Genesis	Singles match	5:34
Match No.	Episode 50: Game On (taped on August 17, 2024, aired on August 23, 2025)	Stipulations	Times
1	Animal Instinct (Goldie Collins and Katarina Jinx) defeated Kara Kai and Xena Phoenix	Tag team match	3:34
2	Tatevik The Gamer defeated Sylvia Sanchez	Singles match	3:44
3	Penelope Pink and Holly Swag (with Lana Star) (c) defeated Princess Aussie & Santana Garrett via disqualification	Tag team match for the WOW World Tag Team Championship	8:37
Match No.	Episode 51: Green With Envy (taped on August 17, 2024, aired on August 30, 2025)	Stipulations	Times
1	Gabriella Cruz defeated Gigi Gianni (with The Alliance (BK Rhythm, Reina Del Rey and Adriana Gambino))	Singles match	5:04
2	Big Rig Betty and Jessie Jones defeated The Environmentalists (Sprout Greens and Scout Parker)	Tag team match	6:19
3	Monsters & Metal (Chainsaw, Daisy Lane and Fury) defeated Top Tier (Coach Campanelli, Gloria Glitter and Kandi Krush) (c)	Non-title Six-woman tag team match	7:52
Match No.	Episode 52: Unfinished Business (taped on August 17, 2024, aired on September 6, 2025)	Stipulations	Times
1	Princess Aussie & Santana Garrett defeated Genesis and Sylvia Sanchez	Tag team match	6:21
2	The Island Girl Kalaki defeated Vicious Veronica VaRoom	Singles match	4:11
3	Kara Kai and Xena Phoenix defeated Animal Instinct (Goldie Collins and Katarina Jinx)	Tag team match	4:30
4	The Classmaster (with Samantha Smart) vs. Nikki Nashville	Singles match	3:51

=== List of episodes (season 11/2025-2026) ===
The series is aired on broadcast syndication and CHCH, and streaming on CW Seed, Pluto TV, Facebook and its YouTube channel.

Below are the results of the matches as aired on the TV show and approximate airdates.

Match No.	Episode 1: New Territory (taped on August 17, 2024, aired on September 13, 2025)	Stipulations	Times
1	The Mother Truckers (Big Rig Betty and Holly Swag) defeated Miami's Sweet Heat (Lovely Laurie Carlson and Luscious Lindsey Carlson) (c)	No disqualification Hardcore tag team match for the WOW World Tag Team Championship, (rebroadcast from March 9, 2024)	6:04
2	Magnificent Miranda Mirage defeated Tiki Chamorro	Singles match	3:35
3	Miami's Sweet Heat (Lovely Laurie Carlson and Luscious Lindsey Carlson) (with Lana Star, Penelope Pink and Vickie Lynn McCoy) defeated The Mother Truckers (Big Rig Betty and Holly Swag) (c)	Tag team match for the WOW World Tag Team Championship, (rebroadcast from August 31, 2024)	6:49
Match No.	Episode 2: Daughter's Detour (aired on September 20, 2025)	Stipulations	Times
1	Miami's Sweet Heat (Lovely Laurie Carlson and Luscious Lindsey Carlson) (with Lana Star and Penelope Pink) defeated Big Rig Betty and Jessie Jones	Tag team match for custody of Holly Swag, (rebroadcast from November 9, 2024)	8:08
2	Penelope Pink and Holly Swag (with Lana Star) defeated Big Rig Betty and Jessie Jones (c) vs. Miami's Sweet Heat (Lovely Laurie Carlson and Luscious Lindsey Carlson) vs. Princess Aussie and Tormenta	Fatal Four-Way tag team match for the WOW World Tag Team Championship (rebroadcast from April 5, 2025)	10:36
3	Penelope Pink and Holly Swag (with Lana Star) (c) defeated Princess Aussie and Tormenta	Tag team match for the WOW World Tag Team Championship (rebroadcast from May 10, 2025)	12:52
Match No.	Episode 3: Stirring the Pot (taped on August 17, 2024, aired on September 27, 2025)	Stipulations	Times4
1	Lovely Laurie Carlson vs. Luscious Lindsey Carlson ended in a no contest	Singles match (rebroadcast from May 24, 2025)	7:20
2	Sylvia Sanchez defeated Chantilly Chella	Singles match	4:40
3	Miami's Sweet Heat (Lovely Laurie Carlson and Luscious Lindsey Carlson) defeated Penelope Pink and Holly Swag (with Lana Star) (c) by disqualification	Tag team match for the WOW World Tag Team Championship (rebroadcast from June 14, 2025)	6:33
Match No.	Episode 4: The Cage Match (taped on August 17, 2024, aired on October 4, 2025)	Stipulations	Times
1	Penelope Pink and Holly Swag (with Lana Star) (c) vs. Miami's Sweet Heat (Lovely Laurie Carlson and Luscious Lindsey Carlson) ended in a no contest	Hardcore tag-team match for the WOW World Tag Team Championship (rebroadcast from July 5, 2025)	10:30
2	Penelope Pink and Holly Swag (with Lana Star) (c) vs. Miami's Sweet Heat (Lovely Laurie Carlson and Luscious Lindsey Carlson) ended in a no contest	Lumberjack tag team match for the WOW World Tag Team Championship (rebroadcast from August 9, 2025)	6:44
3	Miami's Sweet Heat (Lovely Laurie Carlson and Luscious Lindsey Carlson) defeated Penelope Pink and Holly Swag (c) (with Lana Star)	Steel cage match for the WOW World Tag Team Championship	9:38
Match No.	Episode 5: Picking Up the Pieces (taped on August 17, 2024, aired on October 11, 2025)	Stipulations	Times
1	Tiki Chamorro and the Island Girl Kalaki defeated Animal Instinct (Goldie Collins and Katarina Jinx)	Tag team match	7:49
2	Nikki Nashville defeated Holidead	Singles match	6:12
3	Miami's Sweet Heat (Lovely Laurie Carlson and Luscious Lindsey Carlson) defeated Penelope Pink and Holly Swag (c) (with Lana Star)	Steel cage match for the WOW World Tag Team Championship (rebroadcast from October 4, 2025)	9:38
Episode 6: Desert Dreams (aired on October 18, 2025)
Special edition episode from Las Vegas, hosted by David McLane & Katie Marie Jones, previewing next week's Vegas show.
Match No.	Episode 7: Curtain Up: Las Vegas! (taped on September 28, 2024, aired on October 25, 2025)	Stipulations	Times
1	Ashley Blaze defeated Kandi Krush (with Coach Campanelli and Gloria Glitter)	Singles match	7:53
2	The Dojo Defenders (Kara Kai and Tara Strike) defeated The Brat Pack (BK Rhythm and Gigi Gianni)	Tag team match	7:12
3	Miami's Sweet Heat (Lovely Laurie Carlson and Luscious Lindsey Carlson) (with Lana Star and Penelope Pink) (c) defeated Big Rig Betty and Jessie Jones	Tag team match for the WOW World Tag Team Championship	7:21
Match No.	Episode 8: Battle Lines Drawn (taped on September 28, 2024, aired on November 1, 2025)	Stipulations	Times
1	Paola Mayfield The Colombian GOAT (with Abilene Maverick) defeated Santana Garrett	Singles match to determine the #1 contender for the WOW World Championship	5:31
2	Daisy Lane (with Chainsaw and Fury) defeated Coach Campanelli (with Gloria Glitter and Kandi Krush)	Singles match	6:00
3	Holly Swag defeated Penelope Pink (with Lana Star)	Singles match	7:47
Match No.	Episode 9: End of the Line (taped on September 28, 2024, aired on November 8, 2025)	Stipulations	Times
1	Tormenta (c) vs. Reina Del Rey (with Adriana Gambino, Gigi Gianni and BK Rhythm) ends in no contest due to shoulder injury to Tormenta	Singles match for the WOW World Championship (rebroadcast from July 26, 2025)	6:26
2	Tormenta (c) defeated The Classmaster (with Samantha Smart)	Singles match for the WOW World Championship	8:00
Match No.	Episode 10: Moment of Truth (taped on September 28, 2024, aired on November 15, 2025)	Stipulations	Times
1	Ashley Blaze and Xena Phoenix defeated The Brat Pack (BK Rhythm and Gigi Gianni)	Tag team match	7:36
2	Fury (with Chainsaw and Daisy Lane) defeated Gloria Glitter (with Coach Campanelli and Kandi Krush)	Singles match	6:17
3	Princess Aussie and Santana Garrett defeated Animal Instinct (Goldie Collins and Katarina Jinx)	Tag team match	6:07
Match No.	Episode 11: War Never Looked This Good (taped on September 28, 2024, aired on November 22, 2025)	Stipulations	Times
1	Genesis defeated Nikki Nashville	Singles match	7:33
2	Chainsaw (with Fury and Daisy Lane) defeated Kandi Krush (with Coach Campanelli and Gloria Glitter)	Singles match	5:04
3	The Mother Truckers (Big Rig Betty and Holly Swag) and Jessie Jones defeated The Fabulous 4 (Lovely Laurie Carlson, Luscious Lindsey Carlson and Penelope Pink) (with Lana Star)	Six-woman tag team match	10:30
Match No.	Episode 12: The Reckoning (taped on September 28, 2024, aired on November 29, 2025)	Stipulations	Times
1	Tormenta (c) defeated Paola Mayfield the Colombian GOAT (with Abilene Maverick)	Singles match for the WOW World Championship	8:15
2	Top Tier (Coach Campanelli, Gloria Glitter and Kandi Krush) (c) vs. Monsters and Metal (Chainsaw, Daisy Lane and Fury) ended in a no contest	Six-woman tag team match for the WOW World Trios Championship	7:37
Match No.	Episode 13: Lights Up (taped on October 14, 2025, aired on January 3, 2026)	Stipulations	Times
1	Animal Instinct (Goldie Collins and Katarina Jinx) defeated Gabriella Cruz and Lil J-Boogie	Tag team match	6:43
2	Penelope Pink (with Lana Star) defeated The Classmaster (with Samantha Smart) and Santana Garrett	Triple threat match to determine the #1 contender for the WOW World Championship	8:01
Match No.	Episode 14: The Freight Train Arrives (taped on October 14, 2025, aired on January 10, 2026)	Stipulations	Times
1	The Alliance (BK Rhythm, Gigi Gianni and Sylvia Sanchez) (with Arianna Gambino and Reina Del Rey) defeated The Mighty Mights (Spice and Sugar) and Keta Rush	Six-woman tag team match	6:01
2	Tara Strike defeated Luscious Lindsey Carlson (with Lovely Laurie Carlson and Lana Star)	Singles match	5:09
3	Top Tier (Coach Campanelli, Gloria Glitter and Kandi Krush) (c) defeated Destiny Diesel, the Island Girl Kalaki and Sandy Shore	Six-woman tag team match for the WOW World Trios Championship	6:58
Match No.	Episode 15: Opportunity Knocks (taped on October 14, 2025, aired on January 17, 2026)	Stipulations	Times
1	Ashley Blaze defeated Scout Parker	Singles match	7:24
2	Tormenta (c) defeated Penelope Pink (with Lana Star)	Singles match for the WOW World Championship	11:56
Match No.	Episode 16: Dadddy's Little Princess (taped on October 14, 2025, aired on January 24, 2026)	Stipulations	Times
1	Genesis (with Drucilla Blade) defeated Catalina Speed	Singles match	8:58
2	Monsters and Metal (Chainsaw, Daisy Lane and Fury) defeated The Alliance (Arianna Gambino, BK Rhythm and Gigi Gianni) (with Reina Del Rey and Sylvia Sanchez)	Six-woman tag team match	7:56
Match No.	Episode 17: Class Is in Session (taped on October 14, 2025, aired on January 31, 2026)	Stipulations	Times
1	Scout Parker defeated Sandy Shore	Singles match	4:32
2	Miami's Sweet Heat (Lovely Laurie Carlson and Luscious Lindsey Carlson) (with Lana Star) (c) defeated The Dojo Defenders (Kara Kai and Tara Strike)	Tag team match for the WOW World Tag Team Championship	5:43
3	Santana Garrett defeated The Classmaster (with Samantha Smart)	Singles match	6:02
Match No.	Episode 18: Contracts and Confrontations (taped on October 14, 2025, aired on February 7, 2026)	Stipulations	Times
1	Genesis (with Drucilla Blade) defeated Ashley Blaze	Singles match	7:58
2	Island Girl Kalaki defeated Catalina Speed (with Vicious Veronica VaRoom)	Singles match	5:23
3	Reina del Rey and Sylvia Sanchez (with the Alliance (Arianna Gambino, BK Rhythm and Gigi Gianni)) defeated Gabriella Cruz and Lil J-Boogie	Tag team match	9:03
Match No.	Episode 19: Championship Titles and Tension (taped on October 14, 2025, aired on February 14, 2026)	Stipulations	Times
1	Animal Instinct (Goldie Collins and Katarina Jinx) defeated Xena Phoenix and Sierra Sands	Tag team match	5:48
2	Scout Parker defeated Drucilla Blade (with Genesis)	Singles match	6:06
3	Monsters and Metal (Chainsaw, Daisy Lane and Fury) defeated Top Tier (Coach Campanelli, Gloria Glitter and Kandi Krush) (c) via disqualification	Six-woman tag team match for the WOW World Trios Championship	11:07
Match No.	Episode 20: Best Damn Thing (taped on October 14, 2025, aired on February 21, 2026)	Stipulations	Times
1	The Enlightened (Dr. Pam Demonium, Miranda the Mindful and Nova Sky) (with the Classmaster and Samantha Smart) defeated The Mighty Mights (Spice and Sugar) and Keta Rush	Six-woman tag team match	5:50
2	Santana Garrett defeated Catalina Speed (with Vicious Veronica VaRoom)	Singles match	5:57
3	Penelope Pink (with Lana Star) defeated Tormenta (c)	Singles match for the WOW World Championship	6:33
Match No.	Episode 21: Alliance Take Over (taped on TBA, aired on February 28, 2026)	Stipulations	Times
1	The Alliance (Arianna Gambino, BK Rhythm, Gigi Gianni and Sylvia Sanchez) (with Reina Del Rey) defeated The Dojo Defenders (Kara Kai and Tara Strike), Ashley Blaze and Sandy Shore	Eight-woman tag team match	9:20
2	Scout Parker defeated Catalina Speed (with Vicious Veronica VaRoom)	Singles match	3:35
3	Reina Del Rey defeated Santana Garrett	Singles match to determine the #1 contender for the WOW World Championship	5:14
Match No.	Episode 22: The First Defense (taped on TBA, aired on March 7, 2026)	Stipulations	Times
1	Destiny Diesel and Island Girl Kalaki defeated Animal Instinct (Goldie Collins and Katarina Jinx)	Tag team match	6:18
2	Penelope Pink (c) (with Lana Star) defeated Gabriella Cruz	Singles match for the WOW World Championship	14:34
Match No.	Episode 23: No Rules. All Risk. One Reward (taped on TBA, aired on March 14, 2026)	Stipulations	Times
1	The Enlightened (Dr. Pam Demonium, Miranda the Mindful and Nova Sky) (with the Classmaster and Samantha Smart) defeated Lil J-Boogie, Xena Phoenix and Sierra Sands	Six-woman tag team match	5:48
2	Monsters and Metal (Chainsaw, Daisy Lane and Fury) defeated Top Tier (Coach Campanelli, Gloria Glitter and Kandi Krush) (c)	Full Metal Massacre six-woman tag team match for the WOW World Trios Championship	14:39
Match No.	Episode 24: Fabulous and Mysterious (taped on TBA, aired on March 21, 2026)	Stipulations	Times
1	Santana Garrett defeated Sylvia Sanchez	Singles match	5:25
2	Ashley Blaze and Tara Strike defeated Miami's Sweet Heat (Lovely Laurie Carlson and Luscious Lindsey Carlson) (with Lana Star and Penelope Pink) (c)	Non-title Tag team match	14:32
Match No.	Episode 25: The Ban Is Broken (taped on TBA, aired on March 28, 2026)	Stipulations	Times
1	The Brat Pack (BK Rhythm and Gigi Gianni) (with Ariana Gambino and Sylvia Sanchez) defeated the Mighty Mights (Spice and Sugar)	Tag team match	10:20
2	Genesis (with Drucilla Blade) defeated Xena Phoenix	Singles match	6:05
3	Tormenta defeated Reina Del Rey	Singles match	8:18
Match No.	Episode 26: Revenge of the Tier (taped on TBA, aired on April 4, 2026)	Stipulations	Times
1	The Classmaster (with The Enlightened (Dr. Pam Demonium, Miranda the Mindful and Nova Sky) and Samantha Smart) defeated Island Girl Kalaki	Singles match	5:41
2	Sylvia Sanchez (with The Alliance (Arianna Gambino, BK Rhythm, Gigi Gianni & Reina Del Rey)) defeated Scout Parker	Singles match	5:32
3	Monsters and Metal (Chainsaw, Daisy Lane and Fury) (c) defeated Top Tier (Coach Campanelli, Gloria Glitter and Kandi Krush)	Six-woman tag team match for the WOW World Trios Championship	10:08
Match No.	Episode 27: Battle for the Belts (taped on TBA, aired on April 11, 2026)	Stipulations	Times
1	Miami's Sweet Heat (Lovely Laurie Carlson and Luscious Lindsey Carlson) (with Lana Star) (c) vs Ashley Blaze and Tara Strike ended in a no contest	Tag team match for the WOW World Tag Team Championship	8:40
2	Penelope Pink (with Lana Star) (c) defeated Santana Garrett	Singles match for the WOW World Championship	12:37
Match No.	Episode 28: Bullies vs. Bullied (taped on TBA, aired on April 18, 2026)	Stipulations	Times
1	Destiny Diesel and Island Girl Kalaki defeated Dr. Pam Demonium and Miranda the Mindful (with The Enlightened)	Tag team match	7:19
2	Gabriella Cruz, Lil-J Boogie, Spice, Sugar and Tormenta defeated The Alliance (Arianna Gambino, BK Rhythm, Gigi Gianni, Reina Del Rey and Sylvia Sanchez)	5-on-5 Survivor Series match	11:02
Match No.	Episode 29: Enlightened Intensions (taped on TBA, aired on April 25, 2026)	Stipulations	Times
1	Animal Instinct (Goldie Collins and Katarina Jinx) defeated Full Throttle (Brooklyn Love and Catalina Speed) (with Vicious Veronica VaRoom)	Tag team match	7:51
2	Xena Phoenix defeated Drucilla Blade (with Genesis)	Singles match	5:18
3	The Classmaster (with The Enlightened) defeated Santana Garrett	Singles match	7:01
Match No.	Episode 30: Frenemies (taped on TBA, aired on May 2, 2026)	Stipulations	Times
1	Monsters and Metal (Chainsaw, Daisy Lane and Fury) (c) defeated The Enlightened (Dr. Pam Demonium, Miranda the Mindful and Nova Sky) (with the Classmaster and Samantha Smart)	Six-woman tag team match for the WOW World Trios Championship	8:00
2	Gloria Glitter (with Coach Campanelli and Kandi Krush) defeated Xena Phoenix	Singles match	2:52
3	Best 4 Business (Kara Kai and Sandy Shore) defeated Ashley Blaze and Tara Strike	Tag team match	9:09
Match No.	Episode 31: The VIPs Are Back (taped on October 22, 2025, aired on May 9, 2026)	Stipulations	Times
1	Genesis (with Drucilla Blade) defeated Gabriella Cruz (with Lil J-Boogie)	Singles match	9:18
2	Penelope Pink (with Lana Star) (c) defeated Island Girl Kalaki	Singles match for the WOW World Championship	8:35
Match No.	Episode 32: Return of The GOAT (taped on October 22, 2025, aired on May 16, 2026)	Stipulations	Times
1	Kandi Krush (with Coach Campanelli and Gloria Glitter) defeated Lil J-Boogie	Singles match	10:23
2	Monsters and Metal (Chainsaw, Daisy Lane and Fury) (c) defeated The Alliance (BK Rhythm, Gigi Gianni and Sylvia Sanchez) (with Arianna Gambino and Reina Del Rey)	Six-woman tag team match for the WOW World Trios Championship	7:17
3	Paola Mayfield The Colombian GOAT (with Abilene Maverick) defeated Tormenta	Singles match	5:21
Match No.	Episode 33: Three Teams. One Dream. (taped on October 22, 2025, aired on May 23, 2026)	Stipulations	Times
1	Coach Campanelli (with Gloria Glitter and Kandi Krush) defeated Xena Phoenix	Singles match	4:57
2	Dr. Pam Demonium (with The Enlightened) defeated Scout Parker	Singles match	5:48
3	Ashley Blaze and Tara Strike defeated Miami's Sweet Heat (Lovely Laurie Carlson and Luscious Lindsey Carlson) (with Lana Star) (c) and Best 4 Business (Kara Kai and Sandy Shore)	Triple threat match for the WOW World Tag Team Championship	8:26
Match No.	Episode 34: Prove Your Worth (taped on October 22, 2025, aired on May 30, 2026)	Stipulations	Times
1	Monsters and Metal (Chainsaw, Daisy Lane and Fury) defeated Full Throttle (Brooklyn Love, Catalina Speed and Vicious Veronica VaRoom)	Non-title Six-woman tag team match	7:19
2	Kandi Krush (with Gloria Glitter) defeated Gabriella Cruz	Singles match	7:16
3	Penelope Pink (with Lana Star) (c) defeated Genesis (with Drucilla Blade)	Singles match for the WOW World Championship	9:56
Match No.	Episode 35: Golden Opportunities (taped on October 22, 2025, aired on August 8, 2026)	Stipulations	Times
1	The Mighty Mights (Spice and Sugar) and Scout Parker defeated The Enlightened (Dr. Pam Demonium, Miranda the Mindful and Nova Sky) (with the Classmaster and Samantha Smart)	Six-woman tag team match	6:15
2	Keta Rush defeated Gloria Glitter (with Coach Campanelli and Kandi Krush)	Singles match	5:01
3	Santana Garrett defeated Paola Mayfield The Colombian GOAT (with Abilene Maverick), Tormenta, Reina Del Rey (with Arianna Gambino)	Fatal Four-Way match to determine the #1 contender for the WOW World Championship	10:58
Match No.	Episode 36: Tag Wars (taped on October 22, 2025, aired on August 15, 2026)	Stipulations	Times
1	Destiny Diesel and Island Girl Kalaki defeated Arianna Gambino and Sylvia Sanchez	Tag team match	6:46
2	Gabriella Cruz and Lil J-Boogie defeated Genesis and Drucilla Blade	Tag team match	6:02
3	Best 4 Business (Kara Kai and Sandy Shore) defeated Ashley Blaze and Tara Strike (c)	Tag team match for the WOW World Tag Team Championship	8:38
Match No.	Episode 37: Power Shift (taped on October 22, 2025, aired on August 22, 2026)	Stipulations	Times
1	Gloria Glitter and Keta Rush defeated Top Tier (Coach Campanelli and Kandi Krush)	Tag team match	7:52
2	Miami's Sweet Heat (Lovely Laurie Carlson and Luscious Lindsey Carlson) (with Lana Star) defeated Animal Instinct (Goldie Collins and Katarina Jinx)	Tag team match	7:45
3	Santana Garrett defeated Penelope Pink (with Lana Star) (c)	Singles match for the WOW World Championship	9:06
Match No.	Episode 38: Trios, Triumphs and Tragedies (aired on August 29, 2026)	Stipulations	Times
1	Top Tier (Coach Campanelli, Gloria Glitter and Kandi Krush) (c) defeated Team Spirit (Ariel Sky, Pep Riley and Sasha Sparks)	Six-woman tag team match for the WOW World Trios Championship, rebroadcast from March 30, 2024	5:49
2	Top Tier (Coach Campanelli, Gloria Glitter and Kandi Krush) (c) vs. Monsters and Metal (Chainsaw, Daisy Lane and Fury) ended in a no contest	Six-woman tag team match for the WOW World Trios Championship, rebroadcast from November 29, 2025	7:37
3	Monsters and Metal (Chainsaw, Daisy Lane and Fury) defeated Top Tier (Coach Campanelli, Gloria Glitter and Kandi Krush) (c)	Full Metal Massacre six-woman tag team match for the WOW World Trios Championship, rebroadcast from March 14, 2026	14:39
Episode 39: Tag Team Fortunes (aired on September 5, 2026)
For years, Miami Sweet Heat defined tag team wrestling in WOW. Five championship reigns, historic victories, and a legacy that helped shape the WOW World Tag Team division. But no reign lasts forever. As new challengers emerged, friendships fractured and rivalries intensified, the battle for the Silvers entered a new era. From Miami Sweet Heat’s historic run to the rise of current WOW World Tag Team Champions Best for Business, relive the matches and moments that changed the championship landscape. Who will write the next chapter in the history of the Silvers?

== See also ==
- List of women's wrestling promotions
