= Beast Games season 1 =

Season of reality television series

Beast Games
- Season 1
- Promotional poster
- Hosted by: Jimmy "MrBeast" Donaldson
- Winner: Jeffrey Randall Allen
- Runner-up: Twana Barnett
- No. of episodes: 10

Release
- Original network: Amazon Prime Video
- Original release: December 19, 2024 – February 13, 2025

Season chronology
- Next → Season 2

The first season of Beast Games, a reality competition show created by Jimmy "MrBeast" Donaldson was first released on Amazon Prime Video on December 19, 2024 and concluded on February 13, 2025.

Jeffrey Randall Allen won the season, defeating Twana Barnett. Allen won a total grand prize of $10,000,000.

== Production ==
=== Filming ===
Filming began with the first round, which was shot through July 18–22, 2024, inside of Allegiant Stadium in Las Vegas, with a total of 2,000 contestants attending. This round is released on YouTube. The Beast City part of the competition that was featured in the first four, sixth, eighth and ninth episode of the TV series as well as a second YouTube video promoting the series featuring 20 eliminated contestants competing for $500,000, was filmed with the remaining 1,000 contestants at Downsview Park Studios in Toronto, Ontario, Canada, in August of that year. The "Beast Island" part of the competition featured in the fourth to sixth episodes, along with the tenth episode of the show was filmed at the uninhabited La Vivienda Island, which is located in the Pearl Islands, Panama.

The filming broke 44 Guinness World Records, including the largest physical cash prize on set ($5,000,000), the most prize money turned down on a competitive reality TV show ($1,000,000), the largest prize fund awarded for a competitive reality TV show ($10,000,000), and the most money won in a single episode of a competitive reality TV show ($2,020,000), and a page in the 2026 Guinness Book of World Records was focused on the show.

== Episodes ==
No. overall	No. in season	Title	Original release date
1	1	"1,000 People Fight for $5,000,000"	December 19, 2024
The episode begins with MrBeast announcing the grand prize of $5,000,000 and introduces the 1,000 contestants who were not eliminated in the initial YouTube video. He starts by offering $1,000,000, split by the number of people who take that offer. Ultimately, 52 people walk away with about $19,230 in hand. In the first game, MrBeast gives the contestants 10 minutes to let one person eliminate themselves so that the remaining players in their column can continue to the next game. The game ends with three columns being eliminated. In the second game, MrBeast asks contestants to stack blocks with varying widths on top of a red starting block within 10 minutes. If one cannot stack the blocks in time, or one's stack falls, they are eliminated. By the end, 605 players remain. In the final round, MrBeast offers contestants increasing amounts of money, but with a catch: they will eliminate themselves and everyone else in their row by taking the money. The prize money reaches up to $100,000, and 493 players move on to Beast City, introduced in Episode 2.
2	2	"493 People Trapped In My City"	December 19, 2024
The 493 remaining contestants settle in Beast City. The contestants line up to receive four tokens, with hints on them, corresponding to the four floors they may go to participate in the next game, and MrBeast allows them to trade tokens. The first game happens on the fourth floor, where selected contestants split into two teams on two sides of the tower. MrBeast's crew drops balls onto the ceiling, which has periodic holes. The balls may fall from any of these holes, and if any balls hit the floor, that team is eliminated. The team on the left side was initially eliminated, but after reviewing the tape, it was revealed that the team on the right dropped their first ball, thus eliminating the right side; it was not initially seen because the guards did not have a line of sight. The contestants with a "2" token go up to the second floor and separate into two teams. The objective is to have the fewest people on one side so that the side moves on and the leaving players are eliminated. MrBeast adds a telephone in both areas to make the game more interesting. In the end, the right-sided team moves on. The players with a "3" token are split into two teams on the third floor. A giant red cup is added in the center, and each contestant is given a ball to throw. Each successful throw earns the team a point. In the middle of the game, MrBeast adds a gold cup, and with each successful throw here, the thrower earns $250,000 but no points for the team. In the end, the team on the left won. Contestants with a "1" token went to the first floor, split into two teams, and participated in a simple quiz game. Contestants of each team were divided further into teams and would come down to battle with the other team's teams for points. The team with the most points would move on. In the end, the team on the left would move on. The remaining players split into four teams, each selecting a captain: Harrison, Deano, Twana, and Jeremy. These captains were given increasing bribes up to $1,000,000; if they accepted the bribe, their whole team (excluding themselves) would be eliminated.
3	3	"The Solitary Experiment"	December 26, 2024
Nobody accepted the bribes, and all remaining players moved on. The contestants are asked to group into teams of three for a potato sack race. One contestant from the team competes in the race, and the winning team wins a special house gaining them immunity for the upcoming challenge. In this challenge, the teams are given their own rooms, with handcuffs on the walls, and a telephone to have anything delivered to their room. MrBeast announces that all teams have five hours to choose one person who is handcuffed to the wall, thereby being eliminated, which helps the other team members qualify for the next game, and if nobody is chosen by the end of five hours, then all members are eliminated. Contestants are allowed to request any item by phone; these items range from food to games of chance and other objects. By the end of the five hours, 94 people are eliminated. Notably, two brothers (the "Habibi Brothers") manipulate a woman in their box into eliminating herself; they later brag about this to others, while Harrison ends up eliminating himself. The next day, MrBeast brings out a golden gift box, and the first person to touch it wins whatever is inside. The winner is awarded a ticket for the first of nine helicopters taking contestants to "Beast Island", the location of the next set of challenges, and can choose five others to join them in the helicopter. MrBeast announces that another ticket to Beast Island is hidden in the city.
4	4	"The Golden Ticket"	January 2, 2025
This episode continues on from Episode 3, and the contestants are searching the city for a ticket. One contestant finds a ticket under a ping-pong table, and MrBeast gives him five other tickets to choose more people who will come up on the helicopter. He does so, and seven helicopters are left. In the next game, MrBeast gives all the contestants one ball to hold in their hands. They are blindfolded, and given ten minutes. The six contestants who drop their ball, closest to the timer hitting zero, move on, and anybody holding a ball after the timer, is eliminated. Then, MrBeast gives the remaining contestants one coin. The objective of the game is to collect as many coins from the other contestants as possible, and the person with the most coins wins a ticket to the island, and five other tickets to pass to people. In the next game, MrBeast asks teams to be made, and gives each front-team player a glass ball on a pedestal. Their objective is to make the ball reach the end of the line without dropping and breaking it, thus resulting in elimination. Three teams move on to the island. In the next game, contestants are told to wear blindfolds and to stand around the landing pad where the helicopter landed. With 60 seconds on the clock, contestants must decide whether to step forward into the inner circle. If more than one person steps in, then everyone within that inner circle is eliminated. However, if only one person steps forward, they receive a ticket to Beast Island and choose five people to accompany them. Then, MrBeast gives people a chance to win $250,000 by climbing up one tower, or continuing to participate. Eighteen people walk away after this, splitting the money between themselves. The contestants on the other tower throw balls towards a golden briefcase, and the one who has a closer throw wins a ticket and five other tickets to hand out to people. MrBeast has everyone break off into groups of six and stand on platforms. MrBeast gives everyone a coin. The objective is for one person on each platform to get the coins from everyone else, meaning only one person per platform can make it to Beast Island. Everyone remaining is sent home.
5	5	"Fight to Win a Private Island"	January 9, 2025
The episode mainly continues the plot following the nine contestants who chose to go to the private island. In the first game, contestants had to hide from Navy SEALs who were coming to hunt them down. The first player to be caught would be eliminated. The next game featured coconuts that each contestant had to throw down a path. They would aim to throw as far as possible, but if their coconut crossed the red line then it would fall down a slope and they would be eliminated. The two contestants who either threw their coconut over the line first or threw it the shortest were eliminated. After that, a boat with all the contestants who chose to stay in the main island appeared. They were faced with the decision to vote a contestant within the six people on the private island, and the player with the most votes would be eliminated. However, after counting the votes, Jimmy offered the contestants on the island a choice to leave the private island and join the main island if they thought that they'd receive the most votes. In the end, nobody took the offer. In the next game, contestants would elect a captain. The captain would then place one "X" and four "O"s in boxes labeled from one to five. They would then call contestants in a chosen order and could tell players which box to pick, which the contestant could then choose to follow or not to follow. After the four boxes were picked from the other players, the captain would then have to take the remaining box. The contestant who picked the box with the "X" would be eliminated (which also applies to the captain.) Following that, the remaining four contestants were taken to a pirate ship with real cannons. MrBeast once again gave the players another offer to cash out and eliminate themselves for $450,000 in gold, a quarter of the private island's value. The offer would be given in the order of the boxes that the players picked last game. The first contestant immediately took the offer, rendering the other contestants unable to take it. In the final game, contestants were given three boards each displaying a number: one, three, and five. Contestants would pick a board and would advance by the number of spaces shown on that board. However, if two or more contestants picked the same board, they would be unable to advance. In the end, the contestant who won would be able to pick the other finalist to compete against in the game to determine who would win the private island.
6	6	"Physical, Mental, Chance...Your Choice"	January 16, 2025
Continuing from the previous episode, the two remaining island competitors (Mia and Brennan) compete in one last game for the rights to the island. Each contestant is given two briefcases; one contains a deed to the island, while the other contains an X. The contestants swap cases until one player has both deeds, thus winning the island, and the right to stay in the main competition: Mia wins, while Brennan is eliminated. Back at Beast City, the remaining 52 competitors are given a choice between 3 games; a physical game, a mental game, and a chance game. 19 contestants chose the mental game, a trivia competition where the contestants were ranked based on their intelligence, giving the highest ranked players the right to choose their opponents. Akira (Player 539) selects Karim (Player 406, one half of the "Habibi Brothers") as his opponent, stating his desire for both brothers to be eliminated due to their manipulative behavior during episode 3. 11 contestants, including Karim and his brother Hazim (Player 527), were eliminated in the mental game. 16 contestants chose to play the chance game, in which a number of contestants were chosen to be eliminated through randomly assigned trapdoors. 12 contestants were eliminated in the chance game. The remaining 17 contestants chose the physical games, in which two teams of 8 would compete in games that would test their strength, speed, and stamina. As the games required an even number of players among both teams, the last player who wasn't picked by either team captain would be eliminated. The pink team won the first physical game, where both teams pushed a monster truck in hopes of getting theirs to the finish line first before the other team. The orange team would win the second game, a series of sprints to grab flags on a football field; the flag would be placed further on the field with each round. For the third and final physical game, both teams were tasked to pick one contestant each for a dead hang challenge; whoever let go and fell first would be eliminated, as such eliminating their entire team. The episode ends on a cliffhanger, as the two selected contestants hang high above the city.
7	7	"The Elimination Train"	January 23, 2025
Continuing from the previous episode, the two contestants hang above the city to determine which team will advance. Player 435 drops and his Orange team is eliminated, allowing the Pink team to win the Physical challenge. MrBeast gathers the 8 winners of the Physical game with the 9 winners of the Mental game and the 4 winners of the Chance game. The 21 contestants are then taken to an "Elimination Train" challenge located on railroad tracks, where they must eliminate other contestants based on the trolley problem. Akira is elected as captain and must decide whether he will win a Lamborghini sports car at the cost of eliminating his three least favorite contestants (including Mia, who won the private island). After choosing to eliminate the three contestants, who are all black women, Mia accuses Akira of racism and misogyny, which other players dispute. Akira is again voted as captain. This round, he is forced to choose whether he will sacrifice his best friend, Colton (Player 359), or his next three least favorite contestants and a Tesla luxury car. Akira chooses to save Colton. The players vote Player 865 as captain in the third round. She selects Akira and Colton as her two least favorite contestants, and then is forced to decide between saving her best friend (Player 424) or Akira, Colton and a "mystery player". After saving her best friend, it is revealed that the captain was the "mystery player", so she has additionally eliminated herself. In the final round, Twana is elected as captain. She selects a player she trusts (Queen) and a player that she does not trust (Deano) to each stand on one railway track. Queen and Deano then each select a contestant to stand with them on their railway track, thus opening that player up to elimination. Deano selects Jaz (Player 697), believing that her closeness with Twana may save him from elimination, whereas Queen selects her friend JC (Player 566). In the end, Twana is left in a dilemma as the Elimination Train approaches.
8	8	"Betray Your Friend for $1,000,000"	January 30, 2025
Twana chooses to save Queen and JC, bringing the total number of contestants down to 10 and ending the Elimination Train challenge. The players return to Beast City to discover a large black mystery box, a renovated tower with floors numbered 1 to 10, and numbered houses also from 1 to 10. After a brief interlude where contestants are reunited with their families, MrBeast reveals that each contestant will be sleeping in their own house. The players vote on who will get the key to House 1; they unanimously choose Twana after MrBeast hints that lower-numbered houses will be advantageous in future rounds. Twana picks Michael to stay in House 2, Michael picks JC to stay in House 3, JC picks Emma to stay in House 4, Emma picks Jeff to stay in House 5 and so on until Yesenia gets the key to House 9, leaving Queen in House 10. The mystery box is revealed to contain $1,000,000: starting with Twana in House 1, each contestant will come out one by one and anonymously take their desired amount of the $1,000,000. Twana goes first and takes $100,000, hoping that the other 9 continue the trend and split it evenly. However, Michael then takes $223,000. JC is third, and after revealing that he has debts of approximately $530,000, he takes $650,000, leaving $27,000. Emma takes $5,000, reacting with disgust; Patrick takes nothing, as he believes that the money is "bait from MrBeast". Jeff takes $7,272. The last four players split the remaining $14,728 equally. Soon after, the contestants are reunited and quickly determine that Michael and JC took more than their "fair share" of $100,000. Although he tries to justify his need for the money, a large rift forms between JC and the other players. The next morning, JC again attempts to explain why he took the money, with little success, and warns the players that Gage, Jeff, Patrick and himself were in a secret alliance. MrBeast calls the contestants to the tower with the numbered floors and reveals the next challenge: a vote to determine the six players who advance to the final challenge of Beast Games. The contestants are allowed one hour and their share of the $1,000,000 to convince and bribe other players to vote for them.
9	9	"Bribe Your Way to the Finale"	February 6, 2025
The game starts when Twana seems like the early favorite, but players avoid voting for her immediately because of a rule that once a player wins a voting round, they can no longer participate in voting for subsequent rounds. Emma gets voted first into the final 6. In the next round, after giving 3 contestants $750, Jeff is voted in, followed by Twana and Yesenia (who only made it because Twana gave her an additional $10,000). In the next round, after lying to many players, Gage is voted in leaving only 1 more open spot. In the final round, Queen, Michael, JC, and Patrick were all talking on the phone and after everyone except Michael has gotten a vote Michael votes in Courtney (the only player who wasn't on the phone the entire time) as the final contestant in the top 6, eliminating JC, Michael, Queen, and Patrick. After the game is over, the eliminated contestants get a personal guard (except for Patrick, who has no money) to carry all their money. Entering the finale set, MrBeast reveals the 2nd pyramid of $5,000,000 and tells all the remaining contestants that the grand prize of $5,000,000 would double to $10,000,000 if a player completes a coin flip. Because Gage made a successful coin flip in Episode 3 to save him from elimination, Gage accepts the $10,000,000 coin flip and throws it in the air as the episode blacks out without knowing if it's heads or (his pick) tails.
10	10	"$10,000,000 Coin Flip"	February 13, 2025
The episode starts with a successful called coin flip by Gage. The prize money is now doubled to $10,000,000. For the first round of elimination the contestants choose a platform to stand on based on the order they were voted in the episode. Emma gets to choose first next to Jeff. They now take turns to throw a red ball in an opponent's tube in front of the platform. Once they score, the opponent is eliminated. Jeff eliminates Courtney first and then Emma is eliminated by Yesenia. In the next game, the four contestants are asked to hold their button at the same time so that a pattern is displayed on the ground, which they have to memorize. When a player releases their button, the pattern disappears and that contestant must walk the pattern from memory, correctly doing so grants them a choice to eliminate one of the three remaining contestants, an incorrect pattern eliminates them instead. Jeff offers to help Yesenia in her attempt but she declines his help and fails on the first step because she chose the wrong starting point. This leaves Gage, Twana and Jeff as the last three contestants. The next player is eliminated by the choice of the Top 50 contestants. The players have the choice to take a bribe of $1M if they think they were voted out. Gage takes the bribe and it is revealed that Twana was the eliminated choice. Twana and Jeff move on to the final game which is a shuffle of ten briefcases of which one has the $10M check inside it. Twana shuffles it and leaves Jeff the choice. He chooses the right briefcase in the first round and is the winner of $10M. Twana congratulates Jeff and is given an extra $100,000. MrBeast, the co-hosts, Jeff and his family celebrate. Following the end of the season Jeff states that he planned to use part of his winnings to for research into the creatine transponder deficiency a rare condition that affects his youngest son Lucas. In addition, it was stated that his other son, Jack, was the person who convinced him to participate on the show.

== Contestants ==
Captains:

$1,000,000 bribe.
Private island (fourth challenge).
Physical games.
Elimination Train.

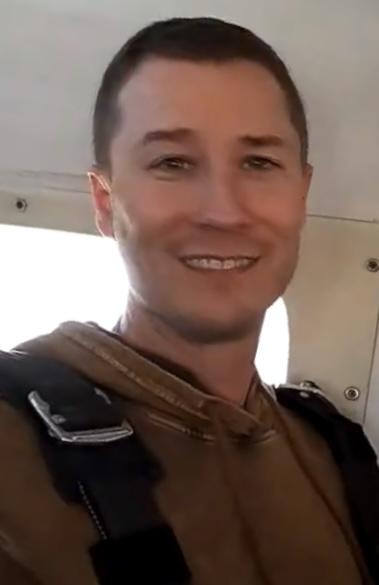
Daniel Betts (Player 412) is a stand-up comedian

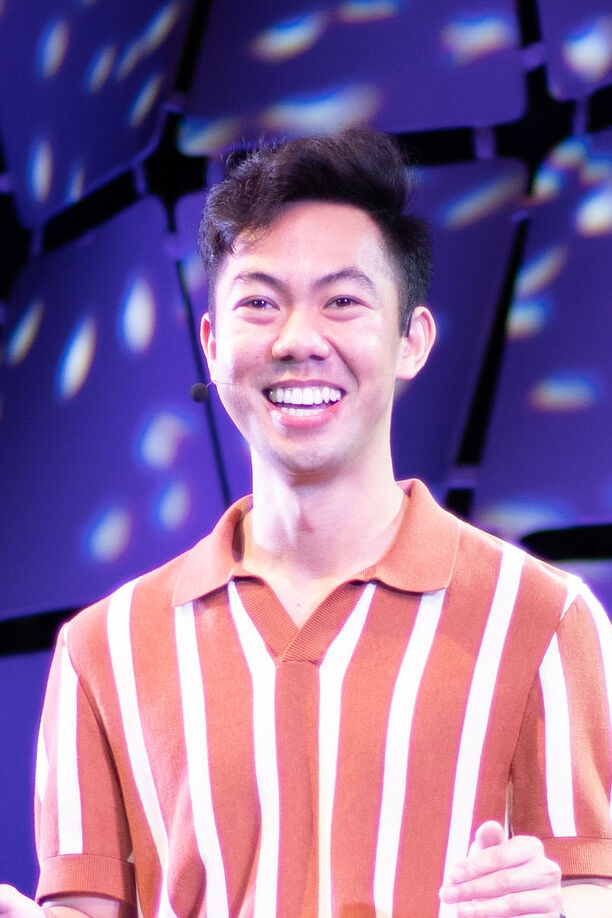
Darrion Nguyen (Player 878) is a science communicator

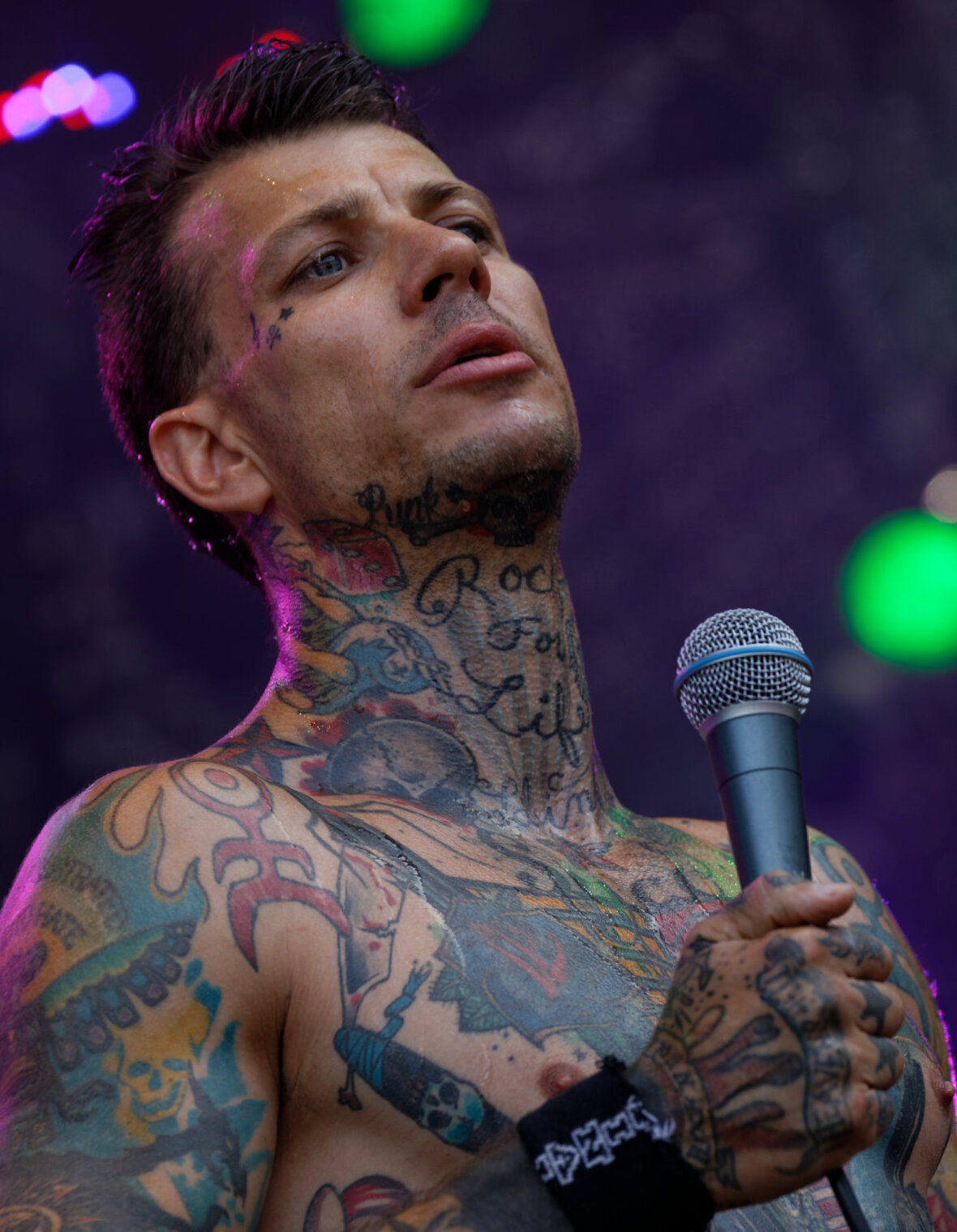
Michael House (Player 453) was a member of punk band Pipes and Pints

List of Beast Games contestants
Number	Name	Description	Prize Money (Note: Every contestant got $2,000 for participating.) (Note: The Top 10 got a free iPhone and T-Mobile Service .)	Finish	Ref.
201	Robert K.	—	$19,230	=949th	
283	Konstantin P.	—	$19,230	=949th	
284	Jackson Gutierrez	—	$19,230	=949th	
367	Julian G.	—	$19,230	=949th	
462 (Note: Player 10 in "Every Minute One Person is Eliminated".)	Jennifer Cheung	—	—	948th	
33	Braedon Sheppard	—	—	=706th	
39	Phalisia Boothe	Squid Game: The Challenge contestant	—	=706th	
64 (Note: Player 14 in "Every Minute One Person is Eliminated".)	Sifu Alsup	Survivor 45 contestant	—	=706th	
94 (Note: Player 3 in "Every Minute One Person is Eliminated".)	Cece J.	—	—	=706th	
95	Imani M.	—	—	=706th	
96	Waziri L.	—	—	=706th	
97	Nancy T.	—	—	=706th	
125	Austin Sprinz	—	—	=706th	
135	Briana Sprinz	—	—	=706th	
160	T-Lee McLaughlin	—	—	=706th	
254 (Note: Player 8 in "Every Minute One Person is Eliminated".)	Amelia Mackey	—	—	=706th	
277	Sharbel I.	—	—	=706th	
278	Jason D.	—	—	=706th	
279	Aranxza C.	—	—	=706th	
280	Johnathan Y.	—	—	=706th	
281	Brandon S.	—	—	=706th	
282	Alonzo D.	—	—	=706th	
285	Daniel O.	—	—	=706th	
286	Michael A.	—	—	=706th	
287	Aliyah E.	—	—		
186	Kevin Eloy	—	—	=606th	
197 (Note: Player 20 in "Every Minute One Person is Eliminated".)	Noah Martin	—	—	=606th	
202	Cary G.	—	—	=606th	
203	Jas Edo	—	—	=606th	
436	Noah Sellers	—		=606th	
840	Mya Iannuzzi	—	—	=606th	
170	Alejandro	—	—	=494th	
196	Walter B.	—	$50,000	=494th	
232	Elee Botani	—	$20,000	=494th	
364	Kaily Rockshead	—	—	=494th	
448	Danielle C.	—	—	=494th	
644	Andrew Penn	YouTube Creator	—	=494th	
646	Kevin D.	—	—	=494th	
726 (Note: Player 19 in "Every Minute One Person is Eliminated".)	Erika Coleman	Worst Cooks in America contestant	$431,000	=494th	
814	Lori	—	—	=494th	
898 (Note: Player 12 in "Every Minute One Person is Eliminated".)	Davinci Crooks	—	$100,000		
342	Andrew	Former wide receiver	—	=432nd	
985	Kaden Ward	—	—	=432nd	
719	Katie	Grandmother	—	431st	
370	Benjamin G.	—	—	=367th	
374	Cooper Fullmer	—	—	=367th	
405	Samson Fullmer	—	—	=367th	
412	Daniel Betts	Stand-up comedian	—	=367th	
657	Emilee	Stay at home mom	—	=367th	
660	Chad	Father of 2	—		
741	Johnathan	—	—		
635	Matthew Q.	—	—	=306th	
601	Nick Gray	—	—	=306th	
200	Cindi Wu	School volunteer	—	=243rd	
878	Darrion Nguyen	Science communicator	—	=243rd	
371	Makayla C.	—	—	=243rd	
451	Bryson P.	—	—	=243rd	
454	Molly S.	—	—	=243rd	
225	Madison "Maddie" Lane	New mom	—	=149th	
251	Harrison Schoen	Navy veteran	—	=149th	
379	Connor Dante	Drag queen	—	=149th	
455	Princess K.	Small business owner	—	=149th	
486	Devin Youngblood	Podcaster	—	=61st	
561	Marissa	Single mom	—	=61st	
573	Canyon	Accordion player	—	=61st	
740	Dylan Andrews	Behavior Technician	—	=61st	
915	Trang Vo	Actress	—	=61st	
951	Cassia Lyn	"More creeped out by Jeremy"	—	=61st	
797	Kelly Mazzola	Real estate broker	—	60th	
672	Timothy Broaddus	Gamer dad	—	59th	
514	Jamal Waked	Food delivery driver	—	58th	
895	Laric Tolleson	Firefighter, Awake: The Million Dollar Game contestant	—	57th	
413	Misha Antonov	Drama student		56th	
457	Esteban Zepeda	Former Division 1 athlete	$450,000	55th	
441	Harrison Watkins	Content producer	—	54th	
711	Brennan Moore	Content creator	—	53rd	
250	Ziad Ali	—	$20,000	=51st	
784	Dayna Flores	—	—	=51st	
237	Nate Norell	Film director	—	=22nd	
245	Grayson Lewis	College student	—	=22nd	
339	Janine Ayana Watkins	—	—	=22nd	
361	Justin McKendry	—	—	=22nd	
406	Karim Arafa	Photographer	—	=22nd	
409	Ellie Joseph	—	—	=22nd	
435	Austin "Auzi" Films	Podcaster	—	=22nd	
494	Matthew Dallin	Animator	—	=22nd	
499	Jordan Egbert	Travel content creator	—	=22nd	
517	Kendra Fuller	—	—	=22nd	
527	Hazim Arafa	Cyber warfare specialist	—	=22nd	
536	Annie Rutman	—	—	=22nd	
545	Rebecca	—	—	=22nd	
554	Arnold	—	—	=22nd	
559	Ava Redding	—	—	=22nd	
616	Natalia Abonza	—	—	=22nd	
631	Ke'Noah "Keno"	—	—	=22nd	
696	Julie Anaya	Dog rescue owner	—	=22nd	
703	Jenicia Rios Sandoval	—	—	=22nd	
723	Christian Davis	—	—	=22nd	
736	Piper O'Donnell	—	—	=22nd	
744	Cornelia Barnwell	—	$20,000	=22nd	
781	Ivy Odom	—	—	=22nd	
803	Matthew "Matt" Knowlton	Nature enthusiast	—	=22nd	
852	Madison Yates	Corporate finance worker	—	=22nd	
858	David Giorgi	—	—	=22nd	
886	Montse Lewin Meija	—	—	=22nd	
976	Daffne Cruz	"Yelled during timer game"	—	=22nd	
991	Jeremy Grant	Polar bear guard	—	=22nd	
182	Monece Starling	Pie shop owner	$20,000	=19th	
626	Rikeyah "Stitch"	Piano student	—	=19th	
952	Mia Speight	Former personal trainer, island winner	$1,800,000	=19th	
351	Johnel "Nelly" Crux	Missionary	—	=16th	
907	Jesica Simon	Postal delivery driver	—	=16th	
990	Eric Montanez	Web designer, TikTok creator	—	=16th	
359	Colton Cortese	Biopharma worker	—	=13th	
539	Akira Andrews	Adventure park employee	$200,000	=13th	
865	Bethany Dawson	Mother of 2	—	=13th	
380	Dean "Deano" Viana	Retired fire captain	—	=11th	
697	Jazmine Robinson	Avid fisherwoman	—	=11th	
453	Michael Robert House	Anděl Award winner	$236,878	=7th	
566	JC Gallego Iori	LGBTQ+ fertility advocate, Awake: The Million Dollar Game contestant	$655,000	=7th	
817	Brittney "Queen" Thornton	Airline customer service agent	$6,439	=7th	
930	Patrick Carroll Jr.	Sales broker	—	=7th	
424	Courtney Ferris	Freelance photographer	$7,439	6th	
937	Emma Nelson	Receptionist	$5,000	5th	
947	Yesenia Hernandez Jaime	Medical assistant	$0.50	4th	
974	Gage Gallagher	Emergency medical technician	$1,000,000	3rd	
830	Twana Barnett	Wrestler	$190,000	2nd	
831	Jeffrey Randall Allen	Devoted dad	$10,009,244	1st	

== Reception ==
Season 1 of Beast Games was released on Amazon Prime Video between December 2024 and February 2025 as ten episodes, released weekly. It became Prime Video's most watched unscripted series ever and its second largest series debut of 2025, though it was received poorly by critics. Several contestants alleged they were mistreated during production, resulting in a lawsuit against Donaldson's company and several others.

On review aggregation website Rotten Tomatoes, the series has an approval rating of 20% based on 10 critic reviews, with an average rating of 5/10. Metacritic, which uses a weighted average, gave it a score of 38 out of 100 based on five critics, indicating "generally unfavorable" reviews. Several reviewers critiqued Donaldson's performance as loud and shallow and the show's lack of focus on its contestants. Naomi Fry of The New Yorker wrote that the use of contestants' numbers instead of their names made it difficult to empathize with them, unlike other reality shows. IGN, The Guardian, Vox, and PC Gamer criticized the show for closely following the premise of Squid Game while stripping away its dystopian tone.

The financial aspects of the show have also come under scrutiny. Katie Notopoulos of Business Insider enjoyed the show, but she worried that it could communicate to children the lack of value in money. Lauren Saunders of the National Consumer Law Center and Andrew Kushner of the Center for Responsible Lending criticized sponsor MoneyLion, a financial tech and cash advance company, for advertising to a young audience, which Kushner said were more susceptible to "the slick marketing" of the finance industry. Jeff Yang similarly argued that the sponsorship would allow MoneyLion's owner, Gen Digital, to target groups in MrBeast's audience facing "dire economic precarity".

Some critics have analyzed the political implications of the show. According to Yang, while Squid Game was creating contextual critiques of oligarchs and exploiting disadvantaged people, Beast Games is unwittingly glorifying these concepts. Patrick Freyne of The Irish Times compared the giving away of islands to contestants in the fifth episode to colonialism.

In response to IGN's negative review, Donaldson wrote "Yeah, sad one person who doesn't like me can just label something a thousand people poured their lives into a 2 out of 10 when it's clearly not." Donaldson similarly questioned the gap between audience and critic scores on Rotten Tomatoes.
