= Beast Games season 2 =

Beast Games
- Season 2
- Promo poster
- Hosted by: Jimmy "MrBeast" Donaldson
- Winner: Tyler Lucas
- Runner-up: Cory Sims
- No. of episodes: 10

Release
- Original network: Amazon Prime Video
- Original release: January 7 – February 25, 2026

Season chronology
- ← Previous; Season 1

The second season of Beast Games, a reality competition show created by Jimmy "MrBeast" Donaldson was first released on Amazon Prime Video on January 7, 2026. The grand prize is $5 million USD, with $15 million total in cash and prizes. The season has a "Strong vs. Smart" theme and includes 200 contestants, 100 who are smart and 100 who are strong.

Tyler Lucas won this season, winning a grand total of $5,105,000.

== Background ==
Season 1 of Beast Games was released on Amazon Prime Video between December 2024 and February 2025 as ten episodes, released weekly. It became Prime Video's most watched unscripted series ever and its second largest series debut of 2025, though it was received poorly by critics. Several contestants alleged they were mistreated during production, resulting in a lawsuit against Donaldson's company and several others.

== Production ==
=== Development ===
In an interview on the Colin and Samir podcast in January 2025, Donaldson said that he would be continuing with season 2 and 3 but he was told not to talk about anything definitive, and that season 2 would be easier to produce than season 1. In February, he said that he was "super happy" with season 1 and "really wants" to do season 2.

In a comment on a Scott Cramer YouTube video in February, he said that season 2 would have the numbers going down quicker than season 1, and would have more skill-based games. He mentioned contacting Cramer to ask him to help with season 2.

Season 2 was confirmed on March 14, when Donaldson released a casting call on Instagram, and announced that the total prizes amount to $15 million USD, which would be the largest single cash prize in reality television history. The series was officially renewed for season 2, as well as season 3, on May 12, 2025, during Amazon's annual upfront presentation in New York.

=== Filming ===
The season is hosted and executive produced by MrBeast, with Sean Klitzner, Tyler Conklin and Mack Hopkins as co-creators. The showrunners are Tyler Conklin and Mack Hopkins, who also serve as executive producers together with Michael Cruz, Jeff Housenbold, Michael Miller, Josh Kulic and Chris Keiper, and Tyler Conklin is the Series Director.

Filming began in June 2025.

The majority of the season was filmed in North Carolina. The production received a $15 million grant from the State of North Carolina, representing nearly half of the state's $31 million annual film and entertainment grant program. To enable the grant, North Carolina amended its film incentive guidelines in June 2025 to clarify that reality-based competition series would not be considered game shows and thus would be eligible for grant awards. The production employed approximately 630 people in the state throughout filming and post-production. Most of the season is set in Beast City, located in Greenville, North Carolina. Filming at Beast City ran continuously for 31.5 days. Episodes 1 and 2 were partly filmed at Dark Horse Stages in Wilmington, North Carolina.

The opening of episode 1 was filmed at a temporary sound stage built on a vacant lot near the South Point Hotel in Las Vegas. The building, resembling an aircraft hangar, was used by the production from May 1 until June 30. Officials of the Nevada Governor's Office of Economic Development said that the production had an estimated $16 million budget.

Episode 4 features a crossover with CBS reality series Survivor. Filmed in Fiji after the production of Survivor 49, the Survivor production team hosted a series of challenges for Beast Games, with Survivor host Jeff Probst appearing as a co-host as part of the crossover. As part of the crossover, MrBeast also appeared in an episode of Survivor 50: In the Hands of the Fans to present a twist called "Super Beware Advantage".

Episodes 8 (partly), 9, and 10 were filmed in Riyadh, Saudi Arabia. The outdoor portions were filmed at The Square, a replica of Times Square located within Boulevard City, near the site where MrBeast would later open the temporary Beast Land theme park, while studio segments were filmed at AlHisn Big Time Studios.

Filming was completed in August 2025.

=== Localized versions ===
Two episodes of the season feature localized versions for different international markets, with region-specific creators receiving additional screen time in their respective editions. Episode 1 features Uruguayan creator Fede Vigevani in Spanish-speaking territories and French creator Amixem in French-speaking territories, while episode 9 features Indian YouTuber CarryMinati in India.

== Episodes ==
No. overall	No. in season	Title	Original release date
11	1	"Strong vs Smart Compete for $5,000,000"	January 7, 2026
12	2	"Choose Your Fate"	January 7, 2026
13	3	"The Obstacle Course"	January 7, 2026
14	4	"The Survivor Takeover"	January 14, 2026
15	5	"Ask For Anything You Want"	January 21, 2026
16	6	"Hearts Will Be Smashed"	January 28, 2026
17	7	"Bury Me Alive"	February 4, 2026
18	8	"Would You Steal $1,000,000?"	February 11, 2026
19	9	"Trust Nobody"	February 18, 2026
20	10	"$5,000,000 Decision"	February 25, 2026

== Reception ==
Reception for the second season was more positive than that of the first. On the review aggregator website Rotten Tomatoes, 78% of 9 critics' reviews are positive. The website's consensus reads: "A twist-filled return, Beast Games offers a feast of cliffhangers."

Hannah J Davies of The Guardian rated the season 2/5 stars, finding the season tedious and immature.

== Contestants ==
Season 2 of Beast Games featured an initial 200 contestants, compared to the starting 1,000 in the first season. The contestants were split into two teams, "Smart" and "Strong". In the second episode, ten contestants were given the opportunity to take a bribe and swap with a contestant from the first season. This brought the total number of contestants competing in the second season to 210. The ten returning players were classified as "OG".

Contestant Information
Contestant Number	Contestant Name	Description	Team	Episode Eliminated	Challenge	Placement
1	Zion Collins	Aerospace Engineer	Smart	Episode 3	Obstacle Course	46th
2	Sammie Harker	Neuroscience PHD Student	Smart	Episode 1	Opening Smart Challenge	111th
3	Ashley "Koala" Chu	Solo World Traveler	Smart	Episode 1	Opening Smart Challenge	111th
4	Noah Polacek	Chess Champion	Smart	Episode 1	Opening Smart Challenge	111th
5	Zara Keshwani	Rubik's Cube Savant	Smart	Episode 2	Balls	92nd
6	Omar Abed	Top U.S. High School Alum	Smart	Episode 3	Obstacle Course	26th
7	Jenny Vazquez-Newsum	Leadership Strategist	Smart	Episode 1	Opening Smart Challenge	111th
8	Shelby Pate	Mental Health Specialist	Smart	Episode 1	Opening Smart Challenge	111th
9	Steve Calandrillo	Harvard Law Graduate	Smart	Episode 1	Opening Smart Challenge	111th
10	Sasha Royce	Biodegradable Plastic Inventor	Smart	Episode 2	Bluff	79th
11	Johnny Mostowy	Pro Pokemon Competitor	Smart	Episode 3	Blocks	51st
12	Julie LeBeau	Marketing Director	Smart	Episode 1	Opening Smart Challenge	111th
13	Joseph lez	Media Mogul	Smart	Episode 1	Opening Smart Challenge	111th
14	Alex Dodenhoff	AI Prodigy	Smart	Episode 1	Opening Smart Challenge	111th
15	Christina Trexler	MIT Neuroscience Researcher	Smart	Episode 3	Blocks	51st
16	Mike Aydin	Speaks 4 Languages	Smart	Episode 3	Obstacle Course	29th
17	Bryan Carrasco	Top 1% Board Gamer	Smart	Episode 1	Opening Smart Challenge	111th
18	Joseph	Young Investor	Smart	Episode 3	Obstacle Course	46th
19	Tori Bell	Architectural Engineer	Smart	Episode 1	Opening Smart Challenge	111th
20	Jessica "Jess" Furman	Chess Champion	Smart	Episode 1	Opening Smart Challenge	111th
21	Ethan Healy	Chess Coach	Smart	Episode 5	Solitary Box	15th
22	Jack Fallon	Harvard Research Scientist	Smart	Episode 2	Bribe Swap (with Akira)	105th
23	Jasmine Gongora	Physical Therapist	Smart	Episode 3	Blocks	51st
24	Brent Neves	Chemist	Smart	Episode 2	Bribe Swap (with Deano)	110th
25	Eddy	Street Smart	Smart	Episode 2	Balls	100th
26	Omid	Cybersecurity Expert	Smart	Episode 1	Opening Smart Challenge	111th
27	Inaam Khan	Mechanical Engineer	Smart	Episode 3	Obstacle Course	26th
28	Andrew Herkelman	Math Educator	Smart	Episode 3	Blocks	51st
29	Solomon	Data Analyst with 134 IQ	Smart	Episode 2	Balls	97th
30	Ed	Acturarial Science Grad	Smart	Episode 1	Opening Smart Challenge	111th
31	Brandon Borick	Summa Cum Laude Grad	Smart	Episode 4	Captain Bribe	21st
32	Lexie Kraft	Account Exec at Top 1% Tech Company	Smart	Episode 1	Opening Smart Challenge	111th
33	Rissa	Special Education Advocate	Smart	Episode 1	Opening Smart Challenge	111th
34	Jacklyn "Jackie" Mae	Civil Engineer	Smart	Episode 3	Blocks	51st
35	Vikram Shah	Billion Dollar Problem Solver	Smart	Episode 2	Bluff	74th
36	Adrienne Elizabeth	Top Grad of Masters Degree	Smart	Episode 1	Opening Smart Challenge	111th
37	Tim Sternberg	Sweepstake Expert	Smart	Episode 1	Opening Smart Challenge	111th
38	Kady Bach	Reptile Breeder	Smart	Episode 10	Telephone Game	7th
39	Rahel Desai	MBA Summa Cum Laude	Smart	Episode 3	Blocks	51st
40	Jada Campbell	Mastermind of Political Ops	Smart	Episode 1	Opening Smart Challenge	111th
41	Shawn Alvarez	Guinness World Record Gamer	Smart	Episode 1	Opening Smart Challenge	111th
42	Luke Broyles	Crypto Content Creator	Smart	Episode 4	Captain Bribe	21st
43	Annabel Grossman	Ivy League Graduate	Smart	Episode 1	Opening Smart Challenge	111th
44	Preston A. Gregory	Rubik's Cube Expert	Smart	Episode 1	Opening Smart Challenge	111th
45	Emily Burruss	Rocket Scientist	Smart	Episode 3	Family Emergency	25th
46	Nick Kalra	Inventor	Smart	Episode 2	Bluff	75th
47	Emily Saar	Wall Street Investment Banker	Smart	Episode 1	Opening Smart Challenge	111th
48	Jaden Chambers	NASA Robotics and Mechanical Engineer	Smart	Episode 1	Opening Smart Challenge	111th
49	Luisitin Rodriguez	Mathematician, Husband of Player 225 in Season 1	Smart	Episode 2	Bluff	71st
50	Conner Dodenhoff	Professional Poker Player	Smart	Episode 2	Bluff	77th
51	Cat	Environmental Engineer	Smart	Episode 1	Opening Smart Challenge	111th
52	Joseph Block	PHD in Mechanical Engineering	Smart	Episode 1	Opening Smart Challenge	111th
53	Eric Cheng	Harvard Graduate	Smart	Episode 1	Opening Smart Challenge	111th
54	Mirza	Database Engineer for U.S. Govt.	Smart	Episode 1	Opening Smart Challenge	111th
55	OB Syed	International Philosophy Founder	Smart	Episode 2	Bluff	72nd
56	Apollo Poetry	Stay at Home Dad	Smart	Episode 1	Opening Smart Challenge	111th
57	Lawrence Tolentino	NASA Engineer	Smart	Episode 2	Bluff	78th
58	Jack McKenna	Child Genius	Smart	Episode 10	Ball Kick	6th
59	Emily Foster	Million Dollar Business Owner	Smart	Episode 1	Opening Smart Challenge	111th
60	Abby Kayfus	Photographic Memory	Smart	Episode 2	Bribe Swap (with Courtney)	108th
61	Brandon Chen	Trilingual Genius	Smart	Episode 1	Opening Smart Challenge	111th
62	Trina Horvath	Same IQ as Einstein	Smart	Episode 3	Obstacle Course	41st
63	Emma Wojcicki	99th Percentile for SAT	Smart	Episode 2	Bribe Swap (with Jeremy)	102nd
64	Jesse Lopez	Survivor 43 Finalist, PHD, Human Behavior	Smart	Episode 3	Blocks	51st
65	Miguel	Cancer Research Coordinator	Smart	Episode 1	Opening Smart Challenge	111th
66	Kristen Sansone	Double Major in Neuro & Psych	Smart	Episode 1	Opening Smart Challenge	111th
67	Elizabeth	Mensa Mom	Smart	Episode 1	Opening Smart Challenge	111th
68	Chris Watley	High-Level Government Official	Smart	Episode 3	Blocks	51st
69	Phillip Myers	Master Poker Player	Smart	Episode 1	Opening Smart Challenge	111th
70	Jessica Douglass	8 College Degrees	Smart	Episode 3	Blocks	51st
71	Sarah Edie	Biomed Engineer	Smart	Episode 1	Opening Smart Challenge	111th
72	Nichole Johanson	3rd Generation Treasure Hunter	Smart	Episode 1	Opening Smart Challenge	111th
73	Gary Gasperi	Civil Engineer	Smart	Episode 3	Blocks	51st
74	Hailey Ramirez	Mexican-American League Scholar	Smart	Episode 3	Blocks	51st
75	Asia Fee	Chemist	Smart	Episode 2	Balance	84th
76	Hotheyfa Qais	Top 1% National Public Speaker	Smart	Episode 3	Blocks	51st
77	Nikhil Jyotishi	Dean's List Student	Smart	Episode 2	Bribe Swap (with JC)	104th
78	Gloria Hoggarth	Genius IQ	Smart	Episode 3	Obstacle Course	41st
79	Michelle	High-School Grad at 17 While Raising Child	Smart	Episode 3	Obstacle Course	31st
80	Julia Benko	Nurse Practitioner	Smart	Episode 3	Blocks	51st
81	Amethyst Lumley	Data Science Research for NASA	Smart	Episode 3	Blocks	51st
82	Aanchal Budhrani	Architect	Smart	Episode 1	Opening Smart Challenge	111th
83	Sydney Voyvodich	Helicopter Hydraulics Specialist	Smart	Episode 1	Opening Smart Challenge	111th
84	Rayona	Budget Analyst for U.S. Dept. of Defense	Smart	Episode 1	Opening Smart Challenge	111th
85	Hillary Klug	National Champ, Buck Dancing	Smart	Episode 1	Opening Smart Challenge	111th
86	Sifallah "Safe" Bouyadjera	Pre-Med Student	Smart	Episode 1	Opening Smart Challenge	111th
87	Patrick Kearney	Built NASA Space Satellites	Smart	Episode 1	Opening Smart Challenge	111th
88	Ana	PHD Student at Duke	Smart	Episode 1	Opening Smart Challenge	111th
89	Franceska Lacson	Ultra Sound Tech	Smart	Episode 1	Opening Smart Challenge	111th
90	Laura Londonio	PHD Student & Future Astronaut	Smart	Episode 1	Opening Smart Challenge	111th
91	Sue Smey	Survivor 47 Finalist	Smart	Episode 5	Solitary Box	17th
92	Michelle Chin	Human Calculator and YouTuber, Solved 56 x 72	Smart	Episode 3	Obstacle Course	31st
93	Jordan	Looks Like Justin Timberlake	Smart	Episode 3	Obstacle Course	36th
94	Julia Bakr	Pre-Med Student	Smart	Episode 3	Blocks	51st
95	Mark	Observant Business Grad	Smart	Episode 1	Opening Smart Challenge	111th
96	Sophie Marcolla	Licensed Attorney	Smart	Episode 3	Obstacle Course	36th
97	Emily Merrill	Sweepstakes Champion	Smart	Episode 1	Opening Smart Challenge	111th
98	Sendhil Krishnan	Doctorpreneur	Smart	Episode 1	Opening Smart Challenge	111th
99	Hannah Riggs	Software Engineer	Smart	Episode 10	Block Puzzle	4th
100	Taylor	NYU Philosopher	Smart	Episode 1	Opening Smart Challenge	111th
101	Rose Huang Stegura	Alaskan Elite Powerlifter	Strong	Episode 3	Obstacle Course	31st
102	Diego De La Torre	NPC Sasquatch Champion	Strong	Episode 1	Opening Strong Challenge	165th
103	Julia Danielle Whitesel	Bodybuilder	Strong	Episode 1	Opening Strong Challenge	163rd
104	Eddie Bracamontes	Top 5 Arnold Classic Competitor	Strong	Episode 1	Opening Strong Challenge	165th
105	Morgan Irons	World's 4th Strongest Woman	Strong	Episode 1	Opening Strong Challenge	165th
106	Patrick Clay	Fire Captain	Strong	Episode 2	Balls	98th
107	Joe Callari	Pro MMA Fighter	Strong	Episode 1	Opening Strong Challenge	165th
108	Sonia Quiñones	Marine Corps Vet	Strong	Episode 3	Obstacle Course	31st
109	Angello	Pro Soccer Player & Bodybuilder	Strong	Episode 1	Opening Strong Challenge	165th
110	Sonya Gallegos-Dreiling	Bare Knuckle Fighter	Strong	Episode 3	Blocks	51st
111	Dillon Salva	Former NFL Player	Strong	Episode 1	Opening Strong Challenge	165th
112	John Leahy	NYC Firefighter	Strong	Episode 4	Captain Bribe	21st
113	Eddy Cruz	Record Breaking Powerlifitng	Strong	Episode 1	Opening Strong Challenge	165th
114	Kellie Lund	Surfing	Strong	Episode 2	Balance	91st
115	Mario Gonzalez	Men's Physique Champion	Strong	Episode 2	Balance	82nd
116	Sami Layadi	College Cheerleader	Strong	Episode 1	Opening Strong Challenge	165th
117	Mitch	Professional Bodybuilder	Strong	Episode 3	Obstacle Course	36th
118	Nick Mariano	Wrestler	Strong	Episode 10	Telephone Game	7th
119	Alexis Ayon	Ironman Athlete	Strong	Episode 2	Bribe Swap (with Mia)	101st
120	Sean	Boxer	Strong	Episode 1	Opening Strong Challenge	165th
121	Isabella "Bella" Bond	Triple Jump Champion	Strong	Episode 2	Bluff	73rd
122	Julia Avila Shumate	MMA Fighter	Strong	Episode 1	Opening Strong Challenge	165th
123	Danae Morgan	World Champion Street Lifter	Strong	Episode 2	Balance	81st
124	Martina Baccherini-Cascone	West Coast Bodybuilding Champion	Strong	Episode 1	Opening Strong Challenge	165th
125	Aura Brisa Rispoli	Champion Bodybuilder	Strong	Episode 2	Balance	90th
126	Joseph "JT" Torres	NY Courts Officer	Strong	Episode 5	Solitary Box	16th
127	Jonas Harmer	American Ninja Warrior	Strong	Episode 2	Bribe Swap (with Twana)	106th
128	Noelle Lambert	2x Paralympian	Strong	Episode 1	Opening Strong Challenge	165th
129	Cydney Gillon	Champion Bodybuilder	Strong	Episode 3	Obstacle Course	41st
130	Kat Musni	Body Weight Training Expert	Strong	Episode 1	Opening Strong Challenge	165th
131	Cam Casey	Race Car Driver	Strong	Episode 1	Opening Strong Challenge	165th
132	Jake Havron	Former College Basketball Player	Strong	Episode 1	Opening Strong Challenge	165th
133	Avery Brown	Former Wrestler	Strong	Episode 3	Obstacle Course	46th
134	Adam Fuentes	The Juggernaut	Strong	Episode 1	Opening Strong Challenge	165th
135	Aspen Vincent	Calisthenics Athlete	Strong	Episode 2	Balance	87th
136	Luis Rodriguez	High-Level Parkour & Ninja Athlete	Strong	Episode 1	Opening Strong Challenge	165th
137	John Goggin	Competitive Rugby Player	Strong	Episode 1	Opening Strong Challenge	161st
138	Hayley	Army Vet & Bodybuilder	Strong	Episode 1	Opening Strong Challenge	165th
139	Chandler Snyder	Elite Marathon Runner	Strong	Episode 3	Obstacle Course	46th
140	Michael "Mike" Weinhold	Competitive Wrestler	Strong	Episode 1	Opening Strong Challenge	165th
141	Eddie Collazo	Buff NY Plumber	Strong	Episode 1	Opening Strong Challenge	165th
142	Miguel Cuevas	Federal Agent, Homeland Security	Strong	Episode 1	Opening Strong Challenge	165th
143	Jeffrey "Jeff" Wall	Martial Arts Hall of Fame at 10 Y.O.	Strong	Episode 1	Opening Strong Challenge	165th
144	Justin Cates	4x National Football Champion	Strong	Episode 1	Opening Strong Challenge	165th
145	Brianna Salinaro	Paralympian	Strong	Episode 1	Opening Strong Challenge	165th
146	Ashleigh Wosny	Crossfit Athlete	Strong	Episode 3	Obstacle Course	41st
147	Imani	Personal Trainer	Strong	Episode 1	Opening Strong Challenge	165th
148	Ian Weber	American Ninja Warrior	Strong	Episode 5	Solitary Box	19th
149	Isaiah Lamb	Former Basketball Player	Strong	Episode 1	Opening Strong Challenge	165th
150	Megan Davis	Weightlifting Queen	Strong	Episode 1	Opening Strong Challenge	162nd
151	Nicolly Rosa	Brazilian Powerhouse	Strong	Episode 1	Opening Strong Challenge	165th
152	Monika Ronk	Former Gymnast	Strong	Episode 10	Telephone Game	7th
153	Pe'Lar Handie	MMA Fighter	Strong	Episode 2	Bluff	76th
154	Josh Pircey	National Bodybuilder	Strong	Episode 2	Balls	95th
155	Jared Fields	Big Brother Star	Strong	Episode 1	Opening Strong Challenge	165th
156	Lindsey Carlson	Twin Pro Wrestler	Strong	Episode 1	Opening Strong Challenge	165th
157	Catey Link	Fitness Influencer	Strong	Episode 7	Hearts Will Be Smashed	11th
158	Winnie Ileso	Former Track Star	Strong	Episode 1	Opening Strong Challenge	165th
159	Celeste Frank	Competetive Rock Climber	Strong	Episode 2	Balance	83rd
160	Mark Valeriote	Calisthenics Champion	Strong	Episode 2	Balance	89th
161	Shavon Alexis	Professional Aerialist	Strong	Episode 1	Opening Strong Challenge	165th
162	Tyler Davis	World Champion Strongman	Strong	Episode 6	Hearts Will Be Smashed	12th
163	Ella Kikirov	Strength Athlete	Strong	Episode 3	Obstacle Course	26th
164	Cindy Balandran	National Physique Finalist	Strong	Episode 2	Balls	96th
165	Haley Urban	D1 Lacrosse Athlete	Strong	Episode 1	Opening Strong Challenge	165th
166	Laurie Carlson	Twin Pro Wrestler	Strong	Episode 1	Opening Strong Challenge	165th
167	Tyler Lucas	U.S. Air Force Pilot	Strong	Winner	Winner	1st
168	Jenna Pauly	D1 Pole Vaulter	Strong	Episode 2	Bribe Swap (with Karim)	103rd
169	Jack Fricker	Track & Field Competitor	Strong	Episode 2	Bribe Swap (with Gage)	109th
170	Jay	D1 Athlete	Strong	Episode 1	Opening Strong Challenge	165th
171	Jacob Edie	High School Basketball Star	Strong	Episode 3	Obstacle Course	46th
172	Auguste Auger	Multi-Sport Athlete	Strong	Episode 10	Ball Kick	5th
173	Jim Bent	Former Collegiate Athlete	Strong	Episode 10	Telephone Game	7th
174	Vance Walker	American Ninja Warrior	Strong	Episode 5	Solitary Box	20th
175	Allison "Allie" Jones	D1 Athlete	Strong	Episode 1	Opening Strong Challenge	165th
176	Brint Walton	Weightlifting Butcher	Strong	Episode 1	Opening Strong Challenge	165th
177	Colby Sparkman	Former State Wrestler	Strong	Episode 3	Obstacle Course	36th
178	Ridwan Al Khafagi	Rock Climber	Strong	Episode 1	Opening Strong Challenge	165th
179	Eric J. Leekam	Army National Guard	Strong	Episode 3	Obstacle Course	30th
180	Autumn Taylor	D1 Basketball Star	Strong	Episode 2	Balls	93rd
181	Nicole Bright	Ultra Marathon Runner	Strong	Episode 1	Opening Strong Challenge	165th
182	Jessi DiPette	Fitness Instructor	Strong	Episode 3	Obstacle Course	36th
183	Sierra Thomas	Bikini Competitor & Trainer	Strong	Episode 1	Opening Strong Challenge	165th
184	Evelyn "Nicky" Bruce	Bodybuilder	Strong	Episode 3	Obstacle Course	41st
185	Joe Suarez	D1 Football Player	Strong	Episode 1	Opening Strong Challenge	165th
186	Nicole Goss	Team USA Weightlifting Coach	Strong	Episode 3	Obstacle Course	31st
187	Evonne Britton	Track & Field Silver Medalist	Strong	Episode 2	Balls	99th
188	Carli Smith	Former Pro Bodybuilder	Strong	Episode 1	Opening Strong Challenge	164th
189	Athena Vas	Fitfluencer	Strong	Episode 1	Opening Strong Challenge	165th
190	Sharon	Former Bodybuilder	Strong	Episode 1	Opening Strong Challenge	165th
191	Cory Sims	Navy Vet	Strong	Episode 10	Final Briefcase	2nd
192	Nate Hiett	World Record Pole Vaulter	Strong	Episode 2	Bribe Swap (with Jeff)	107th
193	Kiah Dream	Combat Sport Champ	Strong	Episode 1	Opening Strong Challenge	165th
194	Bryleigh Hansen	Competitive Crossfitter	Strong	Episode 6	Hearts Will Be Smashed	13th
195	Brett Stewart	MMA Fighter	Strong	Episode 10	Self-Elimination Bribe	3rd
196	Sydney Tencate	Athletic Record Setter	Strong	Episode 1	Opening Strong Challenge	165th
197	Michael Biagioni	250 lb Deadlifter	Strong	Episode 2	Balance	88th
198	Sarah Mizel	Competitive Acrobat	Strong	Episode 2	Balance	86th
199	Monae	Cop & Football Player	Strong	Episode 1	Opening Strong Challenge	165th
200	Bryan Dionicio	Former D1 Baseball Player	Strong	Episode 1	Opening Strong Challenge	165th
380	Dean "Deano" Viana	Retired Fire Captain	OG	Episode 3	Blocks	51st
406	Karim Arafa	Photographer	OG	Episode 2	Bluff	80th
424	Courtney Ferris	Freelance Photographer	OG	Episode 3	Blocks	51st
539	Akira Andrews	Adventure Park Employee	OG	Episode 2	Balls	94th
566	JC Gallego Iori	LGBTQ+ Fertility Advocate	OG	Episode 6	Solitary Box	14th
830	Twana Barnett	Wrestler	OG	Episode 3	Blocks	51st
831	Jeffrey "Jeff" Randall Allen	Devoted Dad and Season 1's $10,000,000 Winner	OG	Episode 5	Solitary Box	18th
952	Mia Speight	Former Personal Trainer and Season 1's Island Winner	OG	Episode 4	Captain Bribe	21st
974	Gage Gallagher	Emergency Medical Technician	OG	Episode 3	Blocks	51st
991	Jeremy T. Grant	Polar Bear Guard	OG	Episode 2	Balance	85th

== Prizes ==
In addition to the $5,000,000 grand prize, contestants competed for a private island, valued at $1,800,000, in a series of Survivor themed challenges during the crossover episode. Contestants were given opportunities to take bribes in exchange for eliminating themselves or their fellow competitors. All players received $1,000 for playing. Only players receiving more than $5,000 in prizes are listed.

Prize Information
Contestant Number	Contestant Name	Prize Description	Prize Value
21	Ethan Healy	Survivor Bribe	$50,000
22	Jack Fallon	Swap Bribe	$100,000
24	Brent Neves	Swap Bribe	$100,000
38	Kady Bach	Split or Steal	$160,057
58	Jack McKenna	Split or Steal	$40,000
60	Abby Kayfus	Swap Bribe	$100,000
63	Emma Wojcicki	Swap Bribe	$100,000
77	Nikhil Jyotishi	Swap Bribe	$100,000
118	Nick Mariano	Split or Steal	$342,264
119	Alexis Ayon	Swap Bribe	$100,000
126	Joseph "JT" Torres	Captain Bribe	$1,000,000
127	Jonas Harmer	Swap Bribe	$100,000
148	Ian Weber	Island	$1,800,000
152	Monika Ronk	Coin Bribe, Split or Steal	$510,000
167	Tyler Lucas	Split or Steal, Season 2 Grand Prize	$5,100,000
168	Jenna Pauly	Swap Bribe	$100,000
169	Jack Fricker	Swap Bribe	$100,000
173	Jim Bentayou	Split or Steal	$137,547
191	Cory Sims	Split or Steal	$17,133
192	Nate Hiett	Swap Bribe	$100,000
195	Brett Stewart	Split or Steal, Self-Elimination Bribe	$1,193,000

== Release ==
The season premiered on Amazon Prime Video on January 7, 2026, with the first three episodes being released on that day and the remaining seven episodes being released weekly through February 25.

A seven-part behind-the-scenes docuseries of the production, The Making of Beast Games, is presented by Jon Youshaei and is released concurrently to the season's episodes except for during episode 7's release.
