= Noelle Lambert =

American Paralympian track and field athlete

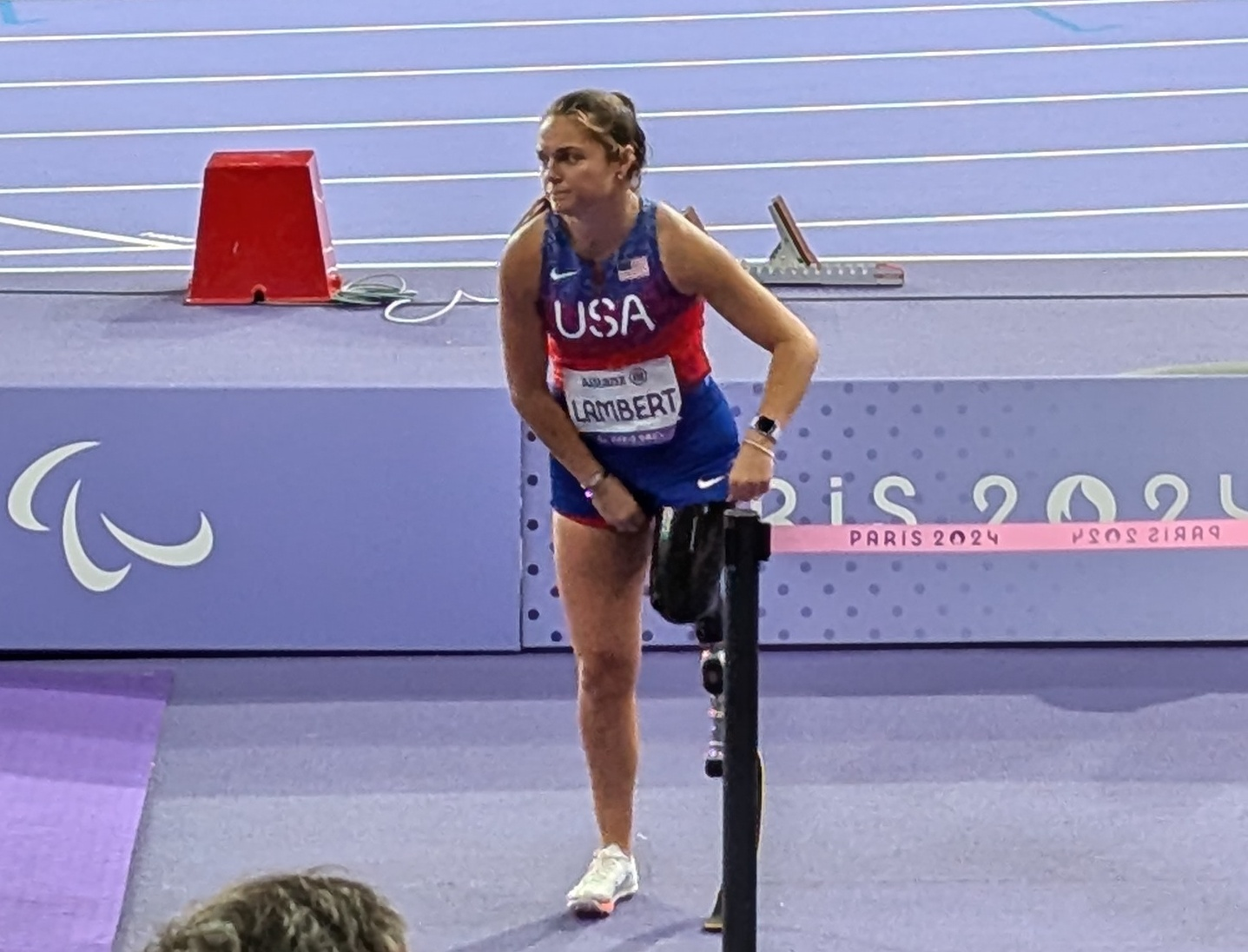
- Lambert at the 2024 Summer Paralympics

Personal information
- Full name: Noelle Lambert-Beirne
- Nationality: United States
- Born: January 24, 1997 (age 29) Londonderry, New Hampshire, U.S.

Sport
- Sport: Para-athletics
- Disability class: T63
Medal record
Women's para-athletics
Representing the United States
World Championships
Bronze medal – third place	2025 New Delhi	Long jump T63

Noelle Lambert-Beirne (née Lambert; born January 24, 1997) is an American Paralympian track and field athlete and a motivational speaker. She is also the founder of The Born to Run Foundation. She competed on Survivor 43.

== Early life ==
Lambert was born on January 24, 1997, in Londonderry, New Hampshire, to Geoffrey and Judy Lambert. She played Division I lacrosse at the University of Massachusetts, Lowell, where she studied criminal justice. Lambert lost her left leg following a moped accident on Martha's Vineyard in 2016 whilst she was a student.

== Career ==
Lambert competed in the 2020 Summer Paralympics in Tokyo. She placed 6th in the 100m T63 with a time of 15.97, setting a new American record. Subsequently training in long jump at the Chula Vista Elite Athlete Training Center in California, Lambert also competed in the 2024 Paralymic Games in Paris. She placed 4th in the T63 women's long jump. During the U.S. Paralympic Team Trials in July 2024, Lambert also made history as the first American T63 woman to surpass 5 meters with a 5.06-meter jump on her second try. She also competed in the women's 100m T63 again and placed 7th.

At the 2025 World Championships held in New Delhi, Lambert won her first World Championships medal, a bronze in the long jump. Additionally she placed fifth in the 100 metres.

== Survivor ==
In 2022, Lambert was announced as one of 18 contestants competing on Survivor 43. She finished in eighth place, joining the season's jury. She ultimately voted for the season's eventual winner, Mike Gabler.

== Other television appearances ==
Lambert appeared on an episode of Raid the Cage in 2025.

Lambert competed on the second season of Beast Games, competing on Team Strong as contestant 128. She did not make it past the first challenge.

== Personal life ==
Lambert founded the "Born to Run" non-profit organization, which helps young adults and children get prostheses.

In September 2025, Lambert married Mark Beirne.
