= Darrion =

Darrion is a masculine given name. Notable people with the name include:

- Darrion Caldwell (born 1987), American mixed martial artist
- Darrion Daniels (born 1997), American football player
- Darrion Nguyen (born 1994), American science communicator
- Darrion Scott (born 1981), American football player
- Darrion Weems (born 1988), American football player
- Darrion Williams (born 2003), American basketball player
