= Vojta (given name) =

Vojta is a pet name of the masculine Czech given name Vojtěch. Notable people who are known by this name include:

- Vojta Beneš (1878–1951), Czech educator and politician
- Vojta Braniš (1893–1983), Croatian sculptor and art teacher of Czech descent
- Vojtěch "Vojta" Kalina (born 1982), Czech bagpiper and artist
- Vojta Kiďák Tomáško (born 1947), Czech singer-songwriter

== See also ==
- Wojta
