= Found & Lost =

2012 studio album by Pipes and Pints

Studio album by Pipes and Pints
- Released: November 6, 2012
- Genre: Rock
- Length: 33:46
- Language: Czech; English
- Producer: Darian Rundall

Pipes and Pints chronology
| Until We Die (2009) | Found & Lost (2012) | The Second Chapter (2019) |

Found & Lost is a 2012 album by the Czech celtic band Pipes and Pints. It was released in November 2012, with the return of Michael House as lead vocals, and was produced by Darian Rundall.

== Track listing ==
The total length for the track listing is 33:46.

| No. | Title | Length |
|---|---|---|
| 1. | "She's The One" | 3:19 |
| 2. | "Calling Me" | 3:10 |
| 3. | "Never Let You Down" | 2:45 |
| 4. | "One Connection" | 2:21 |
| 5. | "Right Or Wrong" | 2:46 |
| 6. | "Found and Lost" | 2:58 |
| 7. | "Her Life and Thoughts" | 2:51 |
| 8. | "Blackhearted Doubts" | 3:11 |
| 9. | "Fear Is Just a Feeling" | 2:45 |
| 10. | "Runaway" | 3:39 |
| 11. | "Warpath 82" | 4:01 |
| Total length: | | 33:46 |

== Reception ==
The album received general positive reviews. Phil Newall from Louder Than War praised the band for songs available in English. The album won an Anděl Awards within the Punk and Hardcore category in 2012. Andreas Dittmann for laut.de despised the "sounds of the bagpipes" used in several singles.
