= Amixem =

French YouTuber (born 1991)

- Chabroud in 2026
- Born: Maxime Chabroud; March 4, 1991 (age 35); Lyon, France
- Education: University Institute of Technology; Audencia SciencesCom
- Children: 2

YouTube information
- Channel: @Amixem
- Years active: 2012–present
- Genre: Comedy
- Subscribers: 9.53 million
- Views: 4.54 billion
- Last updated: September 8, 2026

Maxime Chabroud (born March 4, 1991), known online as Aximen, is a French YouTuber.

== Early life and education ==
Maxime Chabroud was born on March 4, 1991, in Lyon, France. He studied in Angers, where he wanted to pursue a finance degree at the University Institute of Technology. However, he shifted to marketing, enrolling in the Audencia SciencesCom in Nantes. He eventually got a business degree.

== Career ==
Chabroud began his career, by opening a YouTube channel in 2012 during his studies. He began uploading gameplay from the video game Battlefield 3, under the name FPSCoopGameplays, with machinima styled editing. In mid-2013, he hit 10,000 subscribers. He then hit 200,000 subscribers, and by 2015 was at 500,000 subscribers. In 2018, he hit 1 million subscribers.

He was featured in an episode of the second season of the American television series Beast Games, alongside Fede Vigevani.

=== Filmography ===
Title	Year	Role	Ref.
GP Explorer 2	2023	Himself	
Beast Games	2025	Himself (co-host)	

== Personal life ==
Chabroud got married in 2017, and had his first daughter in 2018, as it was revealed in a video titled "I'm Dad".

In 2022, he announced the birth of his second daughter on Instagram.
