= W20 =

W20 may refer to:

- British NVC community W20, a scrub community in the British National Vegetation Classification system
- Hansa-Brandenburg W.20, a German flying boat
- Maya language (Australia)
- Moses Lake Municipal Airport, in Washington, United States
- PENTAX Optio W20, a digital camera
- Samsung W20 5G, a smartphone
- Small stellated dodecahedron
- Toyota MR2 (W20), a sports car
- Westerlund 1-20, a star

== See also ==
- W2O Group, with a letter O in place of the digit 0
