= WCG =

WCG may refer to:

- World Cyber Games, an international e-sports event
- World Combat Games, a sports event
- Wide Color Gamut
- World Community Grid, for scientific research computing
- Worldwide Church of God, renamed Grace Communion International in 2009
- WCG (firm), an advertising agency
- WCG (college), a group of UK colleges
- WCG (Wide DC electric goods), a classification of locomotives of India
