= Vojtěch Kalina =

Czech musician (born 1982)

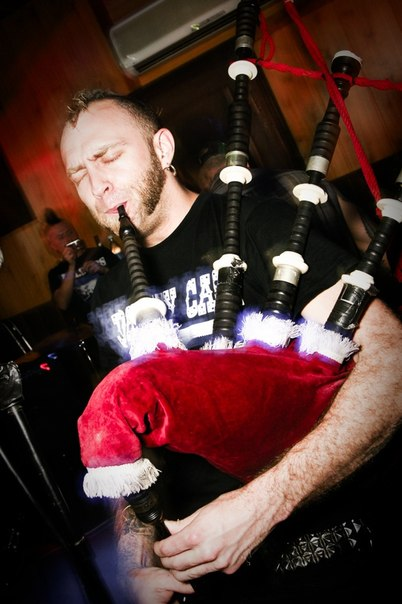
- Kalina in 2011

Background information
- Born: 10 February 1982 (age 44); Prague, Czechoslovakia
- Genres: Celtic punk; punk rock; rock
- Instrument: Bagpipe
- Years active: 2006–present
- Member of: Pipes and Pints (2006–present)
- Award: Anděl Awards

Vojtěch "Vojta" Kalina (born 10 February 1982) is a Czech bagpiper and artist who founded the Celtic punk band Pipes and Pints.

== Life ==
Kalina was born on 10 February 1982 in Prague, Czechoslovakia. He also works as a movement therapist, forming the Conscious Rebels project.

== Pipes and Pints ==
Kalina founded the band in 2006 with Tomáš Novotný. He was inspired by the Pogues. In 2008, he added Michael House to the band. In 2012, he won an Anděl Award with his band. Kalina currently plays as a bagpiper.
