= List of Women of Wrestling personnel =

The Women of Wrestling (WOW) is an American women's professional wrestling promotion. WOW personnel consists of professional wrestlers, commentators, ring announcers and various other positions. Executive officers are also listed.

== Roster ==
=== WOW Superheroes ===
WOW Name	Indie Name(s)	Real Name	Notes
Abilene Maverick	Barbi Hayden	Callee Wilkerson	Former WOW Champion
Arianna Gambino	-	Ariana Ferguson	
Ashley Blaze	Camron Bra'Nae	Camron Clay	Former WOW Tag Team Champion
Big Rig Betty	Amazing Maria	Maria James	former WOW Tag Team Champion RL mother of Holly Swag
BK Rhythm	Killa Kate	Kate Folan	
Brooklyn Love		Rylee Nicole Smith	
Catalina Speed	Carolina Cruz	Emma Maria Diaz	
Chainsaw		Reyna Merre Velarde	Current WOW Trios Champion
Chantilly Chella	Ray Lyn	Rachel Kelvington-Bostic	
Coach Campanelli		Alyssa Ratto	former WOW Tag Team Champion former WOW Trios Champion
Daisy Lane		Alex Underwood	Current WOW Trios Champion Formerly known as Pep Riley
Destiny Diesel		Destiny Brekke	
Dr. Pam Demonium		Ashlyn Baas	
Drucilla Blade		Jazmine Drucilla Jackson	
Fury	Harlow O'Hara	Harlow O'Hara	Current WOW Trios Champion
Genesis		Selena O'Sullivan	
Gigi Gianni	Gia Michel	Candace Michel	
Gloria Glitter	Delilah Doom	Sarah Jean Greaves	former WOW Trios Champion
Goldie Collins		Madelyn Claire Lego	
Gabriella Cruz	Valentynna Reis (Valentina Feroz in WWE)	Rita Reis	
Holidead	Blue Holiday (Cami Fields in WWE)	Camille Ligon	
Holly Swag	Hollywood Haley J	Haley James	former WOW Tag Team Champion
Island Girl Kalaki	Titi / Island Girl TT	Tracy Taylor	
Jessie Jones	Jessie Belle Smothers	Jessie Belle McCoy	former WOW Tag Team Champion
Kandi Krush		Amberley Shaw	former WOW Trios Champion
Kara Kai	Aurora Teves	Vanessa Maria Teves	WOW Tag Team Champion
Katarina Jinx		Ariel de Ment	
Keta Rush		Keta Meggett	
Laurie Carlson		Laurie Carlson	Former WOW Tag Team Champion
Lil J-Boogie		Jaylen Aguilar	
Lindsey Carlson		Lindsey Carlson	Former WOW Tag Team Champion
Miranda The Mindful		Anna M. Chavez	Formerly known as Magnificent Miranda Mirage
Nikki Nashville	J-Rod	Jessica Roden	
Nova Sky		Haley Seaman	
Paola Mayfield	Paola Blaze	Paola Mayfield	
Penelope Pink	Marina Tucker	Marina Tucker	former WOW Champion former WOW Tag Team Champion
Princess Aussie	CeCe Chanel, Simone	Simone Sherie Williams	former WOW Champion
Reina Del Rey		Gina Hernández	Formerly known as Venomous and Ruby Raze
Sandy Shore	Madi Maxx, Madisynn Maxxwell	Madisyn Spagnola	WOW Tag Team Champion
Santana Garrett	Santana Garrett	Santana Garrett	WOW Champion former WOW Tag Team Champion
Scout Parker		Jennyfer Roberts	Formerly known as Ice Cold
Sierra Sands	Gypsy Mac	??	
Spice	Gem Chaparrita Gemini	Valerie Rivera	
Sugar	Candy Girl	Zaida Gonzalez	
Sylvia Sanchez	Myka Madrid	Laura ??	
Tara Strike	Tootie Lynn	Tootie Lynn Ramsey	Former WOW Tag Team Champion
The Classmaster	Lois Grain	Lois Grain	former WOW Champion
Tormenta	Chik Tormenta	Cristina Ramírez	former WOW Champion
Valentina Diamante		Valentina Gomez	
Veronica Varoom		Gabrielle Vargas	
Xena Phoenix		Medina Ali	

=== Tag Teams & Stables ===
Teams and stables currently active have their names written in bold letters.

Team Name	Orientation	Members	Notes
The All American Girls	Face	Americana Santana Garrett	
The Alliance	Heel	Arianna Gambino BK Rhythm Gigi Gianni Reina Del Rey Sylvia Sanchez	
Animal Instinct	Face	Goldie Collins Katarina Jinx	
Best for Business	Heel	Kara Kai Sandy Shore	WOW Tag Team Champions
Big Rigs & Bourbon	Face	Big Rig Betty Jessie Jones	former WOW Tag Team Champions
The Brat Pack	Heel	BK Rhythm Gigi Gianni	
Monsters & Metal	Face	Chainsaw Daisy Lane Fury	Current WOW Trios Tag Team Champions
The Dojo Defenders	Face	Kara Kai Tara Strike	
The Enlightened	Heel	The Classmaster Dr. Pam Demonium Miranda The Mindful Nova Sky Samantha Smart	
The Environmentalists	Face	Scout Parker Sprout Greens	
The Fierce Sisters	Face	Foxxy Fierce Roxxy Fierce	
Lana Star's Fabulous 4	Heel	Lana Star Laurie Carlson Lindsey Carlson Penelope Pink	
The Mighty Mights	Face	Spice Sugar	
The Powerhouse Duo	Neutral	Princess Aussie Tormenta	
Rave from the Grave	Face	Chantilly Chella Holidead	
Spring Break 24/7	Face	Brittany Bay Crystal Waters Sandy Shore	
Top Tier	Heel	Coach Campanelli Gloria Glitter Kandi Krush	former WOW Trios Champions

=== Other on-air personnel ===
Ring name	Real name	Notes
Lana Star	Lana Kinnear	Manager of the Fabulous 4
Samantha Smart	Kirsten Garner	Manager of the Enlightened

=== Inactive ===
WOW Ring name	Real name	Notes
Adriana Gambino	Noelle Giorgi	Now known as Gianna Capri in WWE, and Mafiosa in AEW
Amber O'Neal	Kimberly Dawn Davis	Formerly known as The Beverly Hills Babe
Americana	Samantha Sage	
Angel Rose	Zyra	
Angelica Dante	Hayley Harpurr	
Ariel Sky	Nikii Duke	
Brittany Bay	Britny Underwood	
Crystal Waters	Susie Crawford	
Exodus	Karen Tran	
Foxxy Fierce	Adanna Paul	
GI Jane	Quanice Jackson	
Glitch The Gamer	Alicia Bellamy	known as Vertvixen in the indies
Jennifer Florez	Damaris Largo	known as Jazmin Allure in the indies
Leia Makoa	Diana Milford Lemalu	
Malia Hosaka	Malia Hosaka	
Randi Rah Rah	Kelsey Heather Hornack	
Razor	Sarah Wolfe	
Robbie Rocket	Johnnie Robbie	
Roxxy Fierce	Semira Paul	
Sasha Sparks	Jayce Love	
Sierra Breeze	Alexis Grey	
Siren the Voodoo Doll	Nina Monet	
Atty. Sophia Lopez	Leslie Garza	former manager to Tormenta, Catalina Speed, Sylvia Sanchez...
Sprout Greens	Alikona Shizue Bradford	
Stephy Slays	Stephanie Mason	known as Stephanie La Maravillosa in the indies
Tiki Chamorro	Billionna Reyes	
Vivian Rivera	Everly Rivera	

=== Referees ===
Ring name	Real name	Notes
Ben Sheinberg	Benjamin Sheinberg	
Eddie Furth	Edward Furth	
Jeff McGowan	Jeffery McGowan	Senior Official
Paige Prinzivalli	Paige Prinzivalli	

== Broadcast team ==
The following section pertains to announcers who cover WOW broadcasts. This group includes presenters, ringside commentators, ring announcers and backstage interviewers.

Ring name	Real name	Notes
David McLane	David McLane	Commentator; Host; Owner
Katie Marie Jones	Katie Marie Jones	Ring announcer
Sibley Scoles	Sibley Scoles	Backstage interviewer
Nigel Zane	Nigel Sherrod	Commentator

== Creative team ==
Ring name	Real name	Notes
Jeanie Buss	Jeanie Buss	Executive producer
Selina Majors	Selina Majors	Creative director
