= Darrion Nguyen =

American science communicator (born 1994)

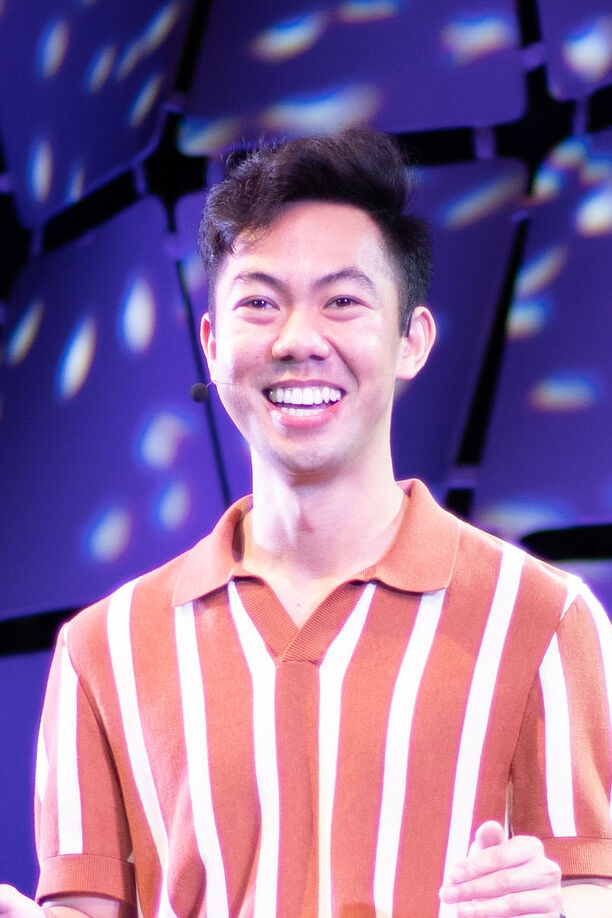
- Nguyen in 2023
- Born: October 20, 1994 (age 32); Houston, Texas, U.S.
- Education: Klein Forest High School University of Texas at Austin University of the Arts London

Instagram information
- Page: darrion nguyen
- Last updated: December 10 2025

Darrion Nguyen (born October 20, 1994) is an Asian American science communicator, fashion designer, and digital creator. He is best known for portraying Dr. Ion on the Ryan's World YouTube channel and for his educational science content on social media.

== Early life and education ==
Darrion Nguyen was born on October 20, 1994, to Dung and Thi Nguyen and is of Vietnamese descent. Nguyen was raised in Houston, Texas. At age 11, his father was killed during a robbery at the family's convenience store. Following the incident, Nguyen fled to seek help and upon returning, found his father had died. Nguyen later graduated from Klein Forest High School before earning a Bachelor of Science and Arts in Biochemistry and a Bachelor of Arts in Theatre & Dance from the University of Texas at Austin in 2017.

Nguyen later returned to school to study fashion design, completing an Associate of Applied Science in Fashion Design. Nguyen was recently accepted into master's programs in fashion design at the University of the Arts London and Parsons Paris.

== Science communication ==
While working as a research technician in 2018, Nguyen began publishing educational science videos to Instagram and TikTok. His videos involve the use of popular audios to personify and dramatize specific biochemistry topics. His audience grew substantially during the COVID-19 pandemic when he focused on COVID-19 vaccine education and combating misinformation.

In 2021, Nguyen was an invited speaker at TEDxSalisbury, where he discussed the significance of educational yet relatable online content and how it can be leveraged to make science easily accessible.

In 2022, Nguyen partnered with Pfizer and Real Chemistry to produce a video series called I Heard it on The Internet aimed at debunking COVID-19 misinformation and rumors. The series has been named a finalist for the 2023 Shorty Award in the category of Best Video Series and Pharma & Healthcare.

In February 2023, Nguyen presented a second TEDx Talk at TEDxUTAustin titled “Reaching Objectives through Improv,” where he discussed the significance of integrating key principles of improvisational theatre into daily routines and interactions.

Nguyen portrays Dr. Ion on the Ryan's World YouTube channel.

== Fashion career ==
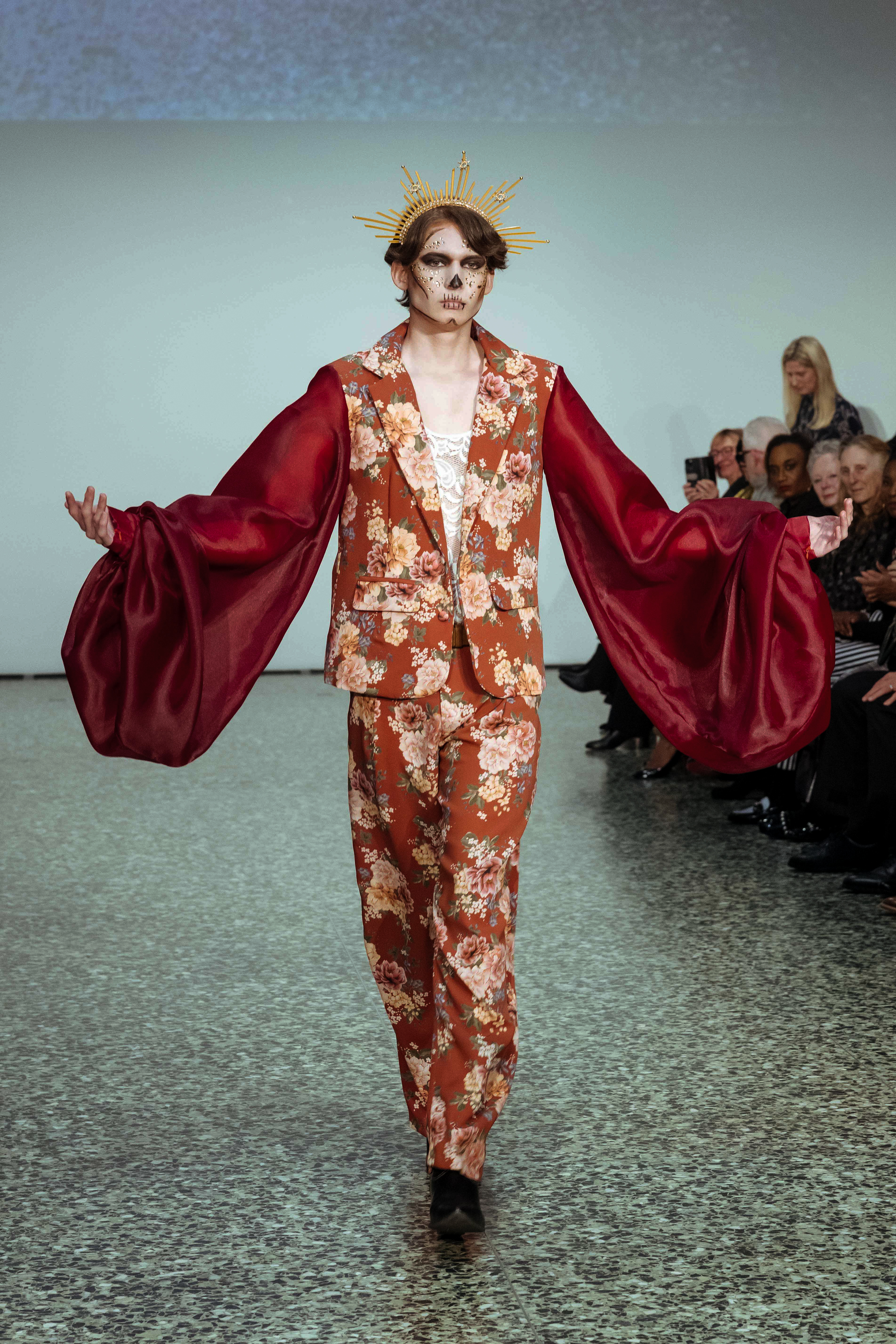
Nguyen's winning garment for MFAH's Fashion Fusion X: "Frida: The Making of an Icon" Runway Show

In March 2024, Nguyen was featured in a Lone Star Live SXSW fashion article covering street style at the festival. The article included a photograph of Nguyen wearing a self-made outfit constructed from upcycled clothing and identified him as a fashion student attending a Tide-sponsored event during SXSW.

In June 2025, Nguyen won first place in the Comic Couture Competition at Comicpalooza in Houston, Texas, for an original design inspired by Aang from the animated television series Avatar: The Last Airbender.

In September 2025, Nguyen won first place in the ACE NextGen x Macy's Sustainable Fashion Project for his sustainable garment, Forecast: Reuse.

Later that year, he competed in his fourth fashion design competition, the Pierre Cardin Young Designers Award (PCYDA), where he won the national Best Creativity Prize.

On January 30th, 2026, Nguyen competed in the Museum of Fine Arts, Houston's fashion competition, Fashion Fusion X: "Frida: The Making of an Icon" Runway Show. He competed in the Reimagine: Reinvent Menswear category, in which designers transformed traditionally feminine garments into menswear. Nguyen was the student winner in this category.

Recently, Nguyen was named a recipient of the Fashion Scholarship Fund scholarship.

== Television ==
Nguyen has appeared as himself on the television programs Kal Penn Approves This Message (2020) and Space Greed (2021), which aired on Curiosity Stream.

In December 2024, he competed in the first season of the reality competition series Beast Games, created by MrBeast, as contestant 878. He advanced to the top 250 out of an initial field of 2,000 contestants.

== Awards and nominations ==
Year	Award	Category	Work	Result
2023	Shorty Award	Video Series	I Heard it on The Internet Video Content Series	Finalist
2023	Shorty Award	Pharma & Healthcare	I Heard it on The Internet Video Content Series	Finalist
2025	Comicpalooza Comic Couture	Fashion Design	"Air Nomad"	First Place
2025	ACE NextGen x Macy's Sustainable Fashion Project	Fashion Design	"Forecast: Reuse:	First Place
2025	Pierre Cardin Young Designers Award (PCYDA)	Fashion Design		Best Creativity
2026	MFAH's Fashion Fusion X: "Frida: The Making of an Icon"	Fashion Design	"Blossoms in Maroon"	Student Winner
2026	Fashion Scholarship Fund	Fashion Design		Recipient

== Research ==
In 2024, the Office of Research Integrity (ORI) found that Nguyen had engaged in research misconduct involving the falsification and fabrication of experimental data in federally funded research conducted in 2018. Nguyen publicly acknowledged the findings, and accepted full responsibility, stating that his actions stemmed from fear of his principal investigator, pressure to meet laboratory expectations, and personal struggles in the laboratory, while emphasizing that these circumstances did not excuse his conduct.
