= Pipes and Pints =

Czech punk band

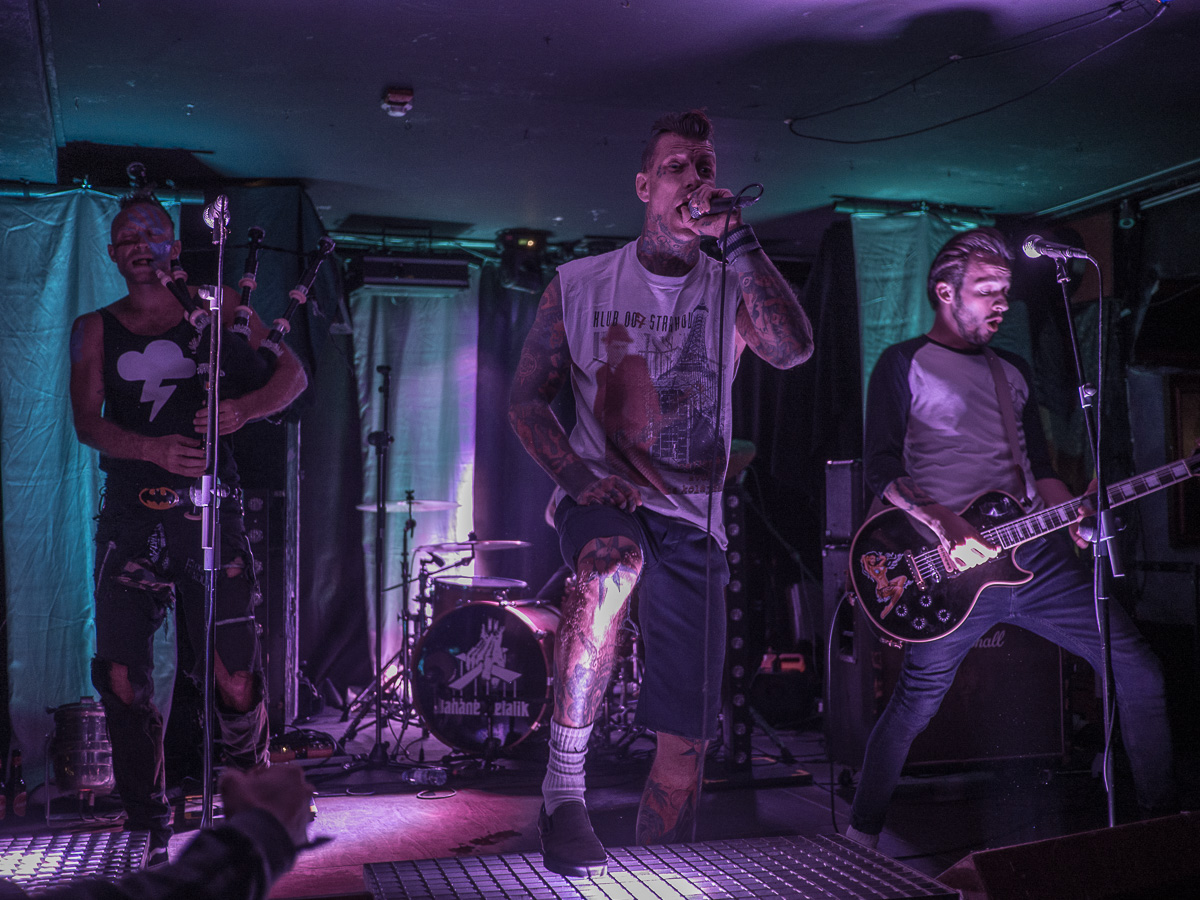
- Pipes & Pints performing in 2015

Background information
- Origin: Prague, Czech Republic
- Genres: Celtic punk; punk rock; rock
- Years active: 2006–present
- Labels: Unrepentant Records; Wolverine Records; Supraphon
- Members: Vojta Kalina; Ivo "Rafan" Traxmandl; Lukáš Vincour; Travis O'Neill; Ondra Balvín
- Past members: Crete; Petr Blaha; Ed; Tomáš Novotný; Syco Mike
- Website: pipesandpints.com

Pipes and Pints are a Celtic punk band from Prague, Czech Republic, formed in 2006 by bagpiper Vojtěch Kalina. Their 2012 record, Found & Lost, won best album in the Punk and Hardcore category at that year's Anděl Awards. As of 2025, they have released three studio albums, one EP, and one demo record. All their lyrics are sung in English.

== History ==
Pipes and Pints was formed in 2006 by bagpiper Vojtěch Kalina, who was inspired by the Pogues, and guitarist/vocalist Tomáš Novotný. They were soon joined by three other musicians: Crete (guitar), Petr Blaha (drums), and Ed (bass). They released one demo in this lineup in 2007, and after playing for two years and touring both at home and across Central Europe, the band was down to Kalina and Novotný. They then added drummer Lukáš Vincour and American singer Michael "Syco Mike" House.

Pipes and Pints released their debut EP, Punkrock with Highland Bagpipes, in 2008, and they subsequently added bassist Ondra Balvín. They followed up with a full-length album, Until We Die, in 2009, which included the five tracks from the preceding EP as well as new material. The record proved a success on rock and punk radio, and the Czech music television station Óčko nominated Pipes and Pints for Best New Artist of the Year. In 2010, the band played 110 shows and festivals, either as headliners or as a supporting act. This included a month-long European tour, a four-day tour of large arenas in Czech Republic, with the Locos, and as part of the Mighty Jäger Tour across Czech Republic.

Syco Mike left the band in 2012. That year, the band began collaborating with American producer Darian Rundall, known for his work with bands such as Pennywise, U.S. Bombs, Suicidal Tendencies, and many others, in order to put together their second full-length album. The record, titled Found & Lost, came out in November, and included vocals by the returning Syco Mike. The band followed it in 2019 with The Second Chapter.

== Ideology ==
Pipes and Pints, like many punk bands, adhere to a DIY ethic. From its inception, the band has taken a strong anti-fascist stance, often performing under the banner of Good Night White Pride, an organization created to counter White supremacy. Moreover, the movement's logo appears on all the band's album covers as well as on much of their advertising materials.

== Gallery ==
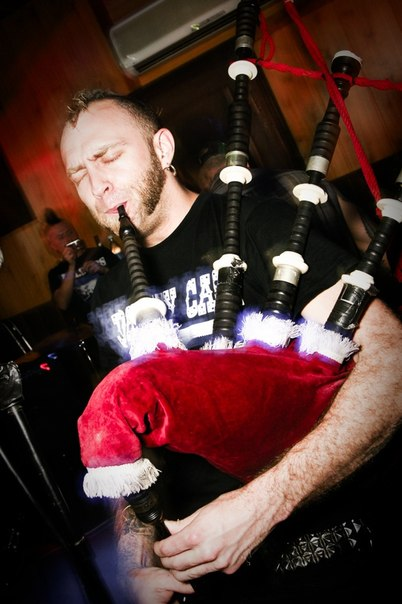
Band founder and bagpiper Vojta Kalina, 2011

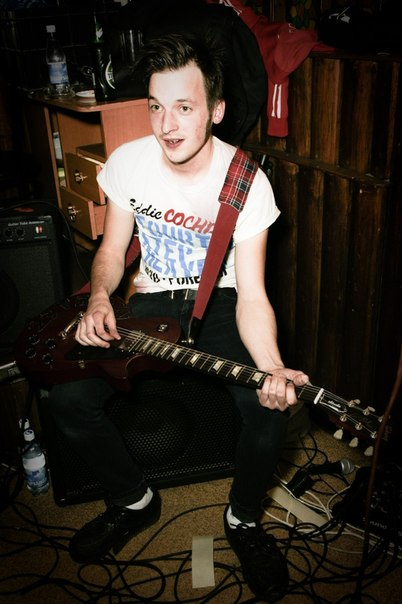
Original guitarist Tomáš Novotný, 2011

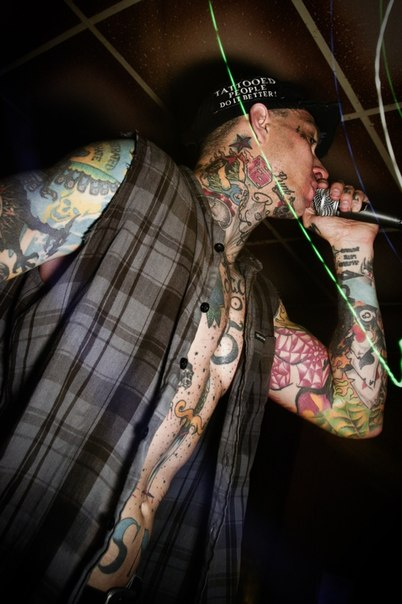
Former vocalist Syco Mike, 2011

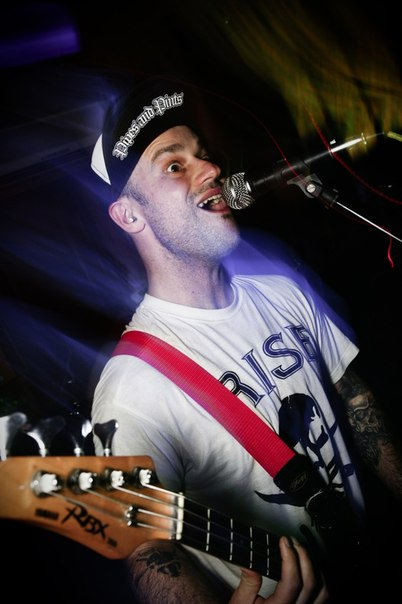
Bassist Ondra Balvín, 2011

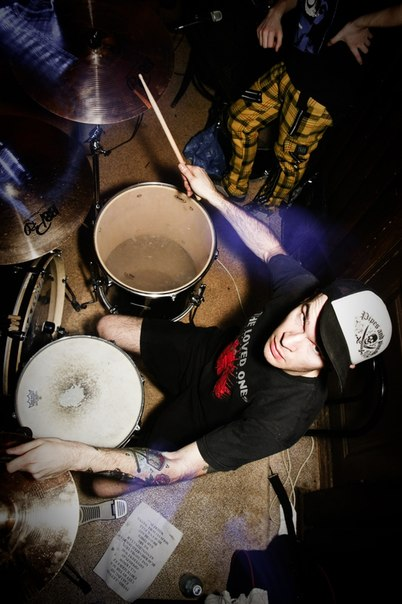
Drummer Lukáš Vincour, 2011

== Band members ==
Current

- Vojta Kalina – bagpipes, vocals (2006–present)
- Ivo "Rafan" Traxmandl – guitar, vocals
- Lukáš Vincour – drums, vocals (2008–present)
- Travis O'Neill – lead vocals
- Ondra Balvín – bass, vocals (2008–present)

Past

- Crete – guitars (2007–2008)
- Petr Blaha – drums (2007–2008)
- Ed – bass (2007–2008)
- Michael "Syco Mike" House – lead vocals (2008–2016)
- Tomáš Novotný – guitar, vocals (2007–2016)

== Discography ==
Studio albums

- Until We Die (2009)
- Found & Lost (2012)
- The Second Chapter (2019)

Demos & EPs

- Demo (4 tracks, 2008)
- Punkrock with Highland Bagpipes (2008)

Compilations

- Singles Collection 2018 (2018)

Singles

- "Raise Our Flag" (2017)
- "Rebel in my Veins" (2018)
- "Dark into the Night" (2018)
- "Karma Killer" (2018)
