= WOW World Tag Team Championship =

Women's wrestling world championship

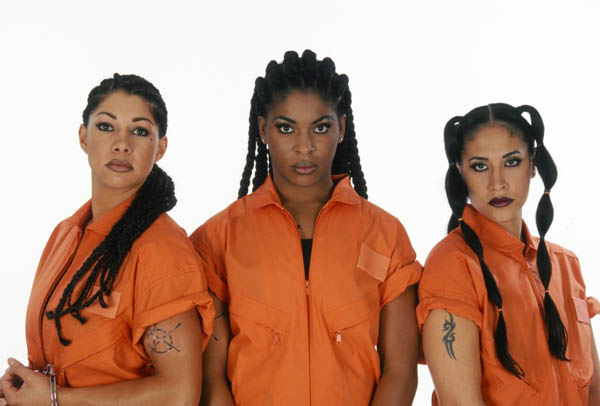
- The inaugural two-time WOW World Tag Team Championship Caged Heat, (l-r) Vendetta, Delta Lotta Pain and Loca

Details
- Promotion: Women of Wrestling (WOW)
- Date established: February 2, 2001
- Current champions: Best 4 Business (Kara Kai and Sandy Shore)
- Date won: October 22, 2025
Statistics
- First champions: Caged Heat (Delta Lotta Pain and Loca)
- Most reigns: Miami's Sweet Heat (Laurie Carlson and Lindsey Carlson) (5 reigns)
- Longest reign: The All American Girls (Amber O'Neal and Santana Garrett) (1,349 days)
- Shortest reign: Caged Heat (Delta Lotta Pain and Loca) and Ashley Blaze and Tara Strike (<1 day)

The WOW World Tag Team Championship is a women's professional wrestling tag team championship created and promoted by the American professional wrestling promotion Women of Wrestling (WOW). Best 4 Business (Kara Kai and Sandy Shore) are the current champions in their first reign.

== History ==
On January 20, 2001, Caged Heat (Delta Lotta Pain and Loca) defeated Harley's Angels (Charlie Davidson and EZ Rider) in the end of 12-teams tournament to become the inaugural champions. Through the tapings of the revived WOW in 2013, Caged Heat returned as champions, but quickly lost the title to The All American Girls (Amber O'Neal and Santana Garrett).

On May 16, 2019, Adrenaline and Fire defeated Monsters of Madness (Hazard and Jessicka Havok) in the finals of a 12-teams tournament to win the vacant title.

On May 2, 2022, the titles appeared to be vacant again. Miami's Sweet Heat (Laurie Carlson and Lindsey Carlson) defeated The Tonga Twins (Kaoz and Kona) in the finals of a 12-teams tournament to win the vacant title.

== Tournaments ==
=== Inaugural WOW tag team Championship tournament (season 1) 2000–2001 ===
Quarterfinals

(November 24-December 1 and 15-January 5 and 12)

Second Semifinals

(December 8-January 19 and 26)

Third Semifinals (none)

Finals

(February 4, 2001) WOW Unleashed

Ice Cold and Poison
Pin

Farah the Persian Princess and Paradise
3:28

Ice Cold and Poison
4:01

Lana Star and Patti Pizzazz
Pin

Lana Star and Patti Pizzazz
Pin

Roxy Powers and Tanja the Warrior Woman
3:20

Lana Star and Patti Pizzazz
Disqualified

Caged Heat
Advanced

Caged Heat
(Delta Lotta Pain and Loca)
Pin

The Asian Invasion
(Jade and Lotus)
3:44

Caged Heat
Pin

Beckie the Farmers Daughter and Bronco Billie
4:05

Beckie the Farmers Daughter and Bronco Billie
Pin

Danger and Riot
6:48

Caged Heat
Pin

Harley's Angels
(with Thug)
5:42

The Beach Patrol
(Sandy and Summer)
Pin

The Daughters Of Darkness
(Misery and Mystery with the Goon)
6:43

The Beach Patrol
4:34

Harley's Angels
(with Thug)
Pin

Harley's Angels
(Charlie Davidson and EZ Rider with Thug)
Pin

Boom Boom the Volcano and Caliente
5:05

Harley's Angels
(with Thug)
Advanced

Lana Star and Patti Pizzazz
Disqualified

Ice Cold and Poison
Pin

Farah the Persian Princess and Paradise
3:28

Ice Cold and Poison
4:01

Lana Star and Patti Pizzazz
Pin

Lana Star and Patti Pizzazz
Pin

Roxy Powers and Tanja the Warrior Woman
3:20

=== Second WOW tag team Championship tournament (season 4) 2016 ===
Round match	Quarterfinals (September 29)	Second semifinals	Third semifinals	Finals
Challengers	Caged Heat (Delta Lotta Pain and Loca) (with the Atty. Sophia Lopez) defeated The All American Girls (Amber O'Neal and Santana Garrett)	postponed	postponed	postponed
Pin	Caged Heat	postponed	postponed	postponed
Times	8:02	postponed	postponed	postponed

=== Third WOW tag team Championship tournament (season 4) 2017 ===
Round match	Quarterfinals (May 11)	Second semifinals	Third semifinals	Finals
Challengers	Caged Heat (Delta Lotta Pain and Loca) defeated The Bully Busters (Keta Rush and Stephy Slays)	postponed	postponed	postponed
Pin	Caged Heat	postponed	postponed	postponed
Times		postponed	postponed	postponed

=== Fourth WOW tag team Championship tournament (season 6) 2019 ===
Quarterfinals (May 16)

Second Semifinals

(May 16)

Third Semifinals

(May 16)

Finals

(May 16) WOW Season 6: Episode 11

The Psycho Sisters
(Fury and Razor) (with Mezmeriah)
Pin

Princess Aussie and Reyna Reyes
(with the Papua New Guinea Warrior)
6:30

The Psycho Sisters
(with Mezmeriah)
9:30

Holidead and Siren the Voodoo Doll
Pin

Holidead and Siren the Voodoo Doll
Pin

The Bully Busters
(Keta Rush and Stephy Slays)
3:50

Holidead and Siren the Voodoo Doll
7:55

Adrenaline and Fire
Pin

Adrenaline and Fire
Pin

The Vengeful Vixens
(The Dagger and The Temptress)
9:40

Adrenaline and Fire
Sub

Amber O'Neal and Jessie Jones
8:15

Amber O'Neal and Jessie Jones
Sub

Lana Star and The Lioness
4:30

Adrenaline and Fire
Pin

Monsters of Madness
10:15

Monsters of Madness
(Havok and Hazard)
Pin

The Dixie Darlings
(Jolene Dixie and Jolynn Dixie)
2:50

Monsters of Madness
Pin

Chantilly Chella and The Sassy Massy
5:30

Chantilly Chella and The Sassy Massy
Pin

Abilene Maverick the Governor's Daughter and The Disciplinarian
(with Samantha Smart)
8:14

Monsters of Madness
Pin

Holidead and Siren the Voodoo Doll
7:55

The Psycho Sisters
(Fury and Razor) (with Mezmeriah)
Pin

Princess Aussie and Reyna Reyes
(with the Papua New Guinea Warrior)
6:30

The Psycho Sisters
(with Mezmeriah)
9:30

Holidead and Siren the Voodoo Doll
Pin

Holidead and Siren the Voodoo Doll
Pin

The Bully Busters
(Keta Rush and Stephy Slays)
3:50

=== Fifth WOW tag team Championship tournament (season 8) 2022 ===
Round match	Quarterfinals (May 5, 6 and 7) (July 15)	Second semifinals (July 13, 14 and 15)	Third semifinals (August 26 and 27)	Finals (September 21) WOW Season 8: Episode 13
Challengers	The Tonga Twins (Kaoz and Kona) defeated Chantilly Chella and Randi Rah Rah The Heavy Metal Sisters (Fury and Razor) (with Mezmeriah) defeated Miami's Sweet Heat (Laurie Carlson and Lindsey Carlson) The Monsters Of Madness (Chainsaw and Siren the Voodoo Doll) defeated The Bully Busters (Keta Rush and Stephy Slays) The Disciplinarian and Jessie Jones (with Samantha Smart) defeated Team Spirit (Coach Campanelli and Randi Rah Rah)	The Tonga Twins defeated Princess Aussie and Tiki Chamorro The Monsters Of Madness (Chainsaw and Holidead) (with Siren the Voodoo Doll) defeated Miami's Sweet Heat Adriana Gambino and Gigi Gianni defeated Chantilly Chella and Foxxy Fierce	The Tonga Twins defeated The Heavy Metal Sisters (with Mezmeriah) Adriana Gambino and Gigi Gianni defeated Miami's Sweet Heat The Monsters Of Madness (Chainsaw and Holidead) (with Siren the Voodoo Doll) defeated The Tonga Twins defeated Miami's Sweet Heat	The Tonga Twins vs. Miami's Sweet Heat The Tonga Twins defeated Miami's Sweet Heat
Pin	The Tonga Twins Miami's Sweet Heat The Monsters Of Madness Team Spirit	The Tonga Twins Miami's Sweet Heat Adriana Gambino and Gigi Gianni	The Tonga Twins Miami's Sweet Heat The Tonga Twins and Miami's Sweet Heat	ended in a no contest Miami's Sweet Heat
Times	8:18 8:27 8:35 7:46	9:01 8:41 8:24	8:53 7:34 6:04	9:07 11:11

== Reigns ==
As of September 22, 2026, there have been eight reigns between six teams and three vacancies. Caged Heat (Delta Lotta Pain and Loca) were the inaugural champions. The All American Girls (Amber O'Neal and Santana Garrett) has the longest reign at 1,349 days, while Caged Heat's second reign and Ashley Blaze and Tara Strike's only reign was the shortest which lasted less than a day. Miami's Sweet Heat have the most reigns as a team with five.

Key
No.	Overall reign number
Reign	Reign number for the specific champion
Days	Number of days held
+	Current reign is changing daily

No.	Champion	Championship change			Reign statistics		Notes	Ref.
No.	Champion	Date	Event	Location	Reign	Days	Notes	Ref.
Women of Wrestling (WOW)
1	Caged Heat (Delta Lotta Pain and Loca)	February 2, 2001	WOW Unleashed	Inglewood, CA	1	29	Caged Heat defeated Harley's Angels (Charlie Davidson and EZ Rider) to become the inaugural champions.	
—	Vacated	March 3, 2001	—	—	—	—	WOW ceased television production after March 3, 2001.	
2	Caged Heat (Delta Lotta Pain and Loca)	January 19, 2013	WOW Season 2: Episode 11	Inglewood, CA	2	<1	Caged Heat were reinstated as champions following WOW's television return. This episode aired on tape delay on May 6, 2016.	
3	The All American Girls (Amber O'Neal and Santana Garrett)	January 19, 2013	WOW Season 2: Episode 11	Las Vegas, NV	1	1,349	This episode aired on tape delay on May 6, 2016.	
—	Vacated	September 29, 2016	—	—	—	—	The Women Wrestling Association (WOW's kayfabe governing body) vacated the championship.	
4	Adrenaline and Fire	May 16, 2019	WOW Season 6: Episode 11	Los Angeles, CA	1	1,085	Defeated Monsters of Madness (Jessicka Havok and Hazard) in a tournament final to win the vacant championship. This episode aired on tape delay on November 23, 2019.	
—	Vacated	May 5, 2022	WOW Season 8: Episode 1	Los Angeles, CA	—	—	On the premiere episode of WOW's eight season, the championship was declared vacant in order to be filled in a tournament. This episode aired on tape delay on September 17, 2022.	
5	Miami's Sweet Heat (Laurie Carlson and Lindsey Carlson)	September 21, 2022	WOW Season 8: Episode 13	Los Angeles, CA	1	73	Miami's Sweet Heat defeated The Tonga Twins (Kaoz and Kona) in a tournament final to win the vacant championship. This episode aired on tape delay on December 10, 2022.	
6	Team Spirit (Coach Campanelli and Randi Rah Rah)	December 3, 2022	WOW Season 8: Episode 24	Los Angeles, CA	1	1	This episode aired on tape delay on February 25, 2023.	
7	Miami's Sweet Heat (Laurie Carlson and Lindsey Carlson)	December 4, 2022	WOW Season 8: Episode 25	Los Angeles, CA	2	203	This episode aired on tape delay on March 4, 2023.	
8	The Tonga Twins (Kaoz and Kona)	June 25, 2023	WOW Season 8: Episode 50	Los Angeles, CA	1	169	This was a No Disqualification, Falls Count Anywhere match. This episode aired on tape delay on August 26, 2023.	
9	Miami's Sweet Heat (Laurie Carlson and Lindsey Carlson)	December 11, 2023	WOW Season 9: Episode 23	Los Angeles, CA	3	1	This episode aired on tape delay on February 17, 2024.	
10	The Mother Truckers (Big Rig Betty and Holly Swag)	December 12, 2023	WOW Season 9: Episode 26	Los Angeles, CA	1	2	This was a No Disqualification, Hardcore match. This episode aired on tape delay on March 9, 2024.	
11	Miami's Sweet Heat (Laurie Carlson and Lindsey Carlson)	December 14, 2023	WOW Season 9: Episode 51	Los Angeles, CA	4	233	This episode aired on tape delay on August 31, 2024.	
12	Big Rig Betty and Jessie Jones	August 3, 2024	WOW Season 10: Episode 12	Los Angeles, CA	1 (2, 1)	6	This episode aired on tape delay on November 30, 2024.	
13	Holly Swag and Penelope Pink	August 9, 2024	WOW Season 10: Episode 30	Los Angeles, CA	1 (2, 1)	8	This was a Fatal 4-Way Championship match also involving Miami's Sweet Heat and Princess Aussie and Tormenta. This episode aired on tape delay on April 5, 2025.	
14	Miami's Sweet Heat (Laurie Carlson and Lindsey Carlson)	August 17, 2024	WOW Season 11: Episode 4	Los Angeles, CA	5	431	This was a Steel cage match. This episode aired on tape delay on October 4, 2025.	
15	Ashley Blaze and Tara Strike	October 22, 2025	WOW Season 11: Episode 33	Las Vegas, NV	1	<1	This was a Triple Threat match also involving Best 4 Business (Kara Kai and Sandy Shore). This episode aired on tape delay on May 23, 2026.	
16	Best 4 Business (Kara Kai and Sandy Shore)	October 22, 2025	WOW Season 11: Episode 36	Las Vegas, NV	1	335+	This episode aired on tape delay on August 15, 2026.	

== Combined reigns ==
As of September 22, 2026.

=== By team ===
†	Indicates the current champion

Rank	Wrestler	No. of reigns	Combined days
1	The All American Girls (Amber O'Neal and Santana Garrett)	1	1,349
2	Adrenaline and Fire	1	1,085
3	Miami's Sweet Heat (Laurie Carlson and Lindsey Carlson)	5	941
4	Best 4 Business† (Kara Kai and Sandy Shore)	1	335+
5	The Tonga Twins (Kaoz and Kona)	1	169
6	Caged Heat (Delta Lotta Pain and Loca)	2	29
7	Holly Swag and Penelope Pink	1	8
8	Big Rig Betty and Jessie Jones	1	6
9	The Mother Truckers (Big Rig Betty and Holly Swag)	1	2
10	Team Spirit (Coach Campanelli and Randi Rah Rah)	1	1
11	Ashley Blaze and Tara Strike	1	<1

=== By wrestler ===
Rank	Wrestler	No. of reigns	Combined days
1	Amber O'Neal	1	1,349
1	Santana Garrett	1	1,349
3	Adrenaline	1	1,085
3	Fire	1	1,085
5	Laurie Carlson	5	941
5	Lindsey Carlson	5	941
7	Kara Kai †	1	335+
7	Sandy Shore †	1	335+
9	Kaoz	1	169
9	Kona	1	169
11	Delta Lotta Pain	2	29
11	Loca	2	29
13	Holly Swag	2	10
14	Big Rig Betty	2	8
14	Penelope Pink	1	8
16	Jessie Jones	1	6
17	Coach Campanelli	1	1
17	Randi Rah Rah	1	1
19	Ashley Blaze	1	<1
19	Tara Strike	1	<1
