= Michael House =

American singer and actor

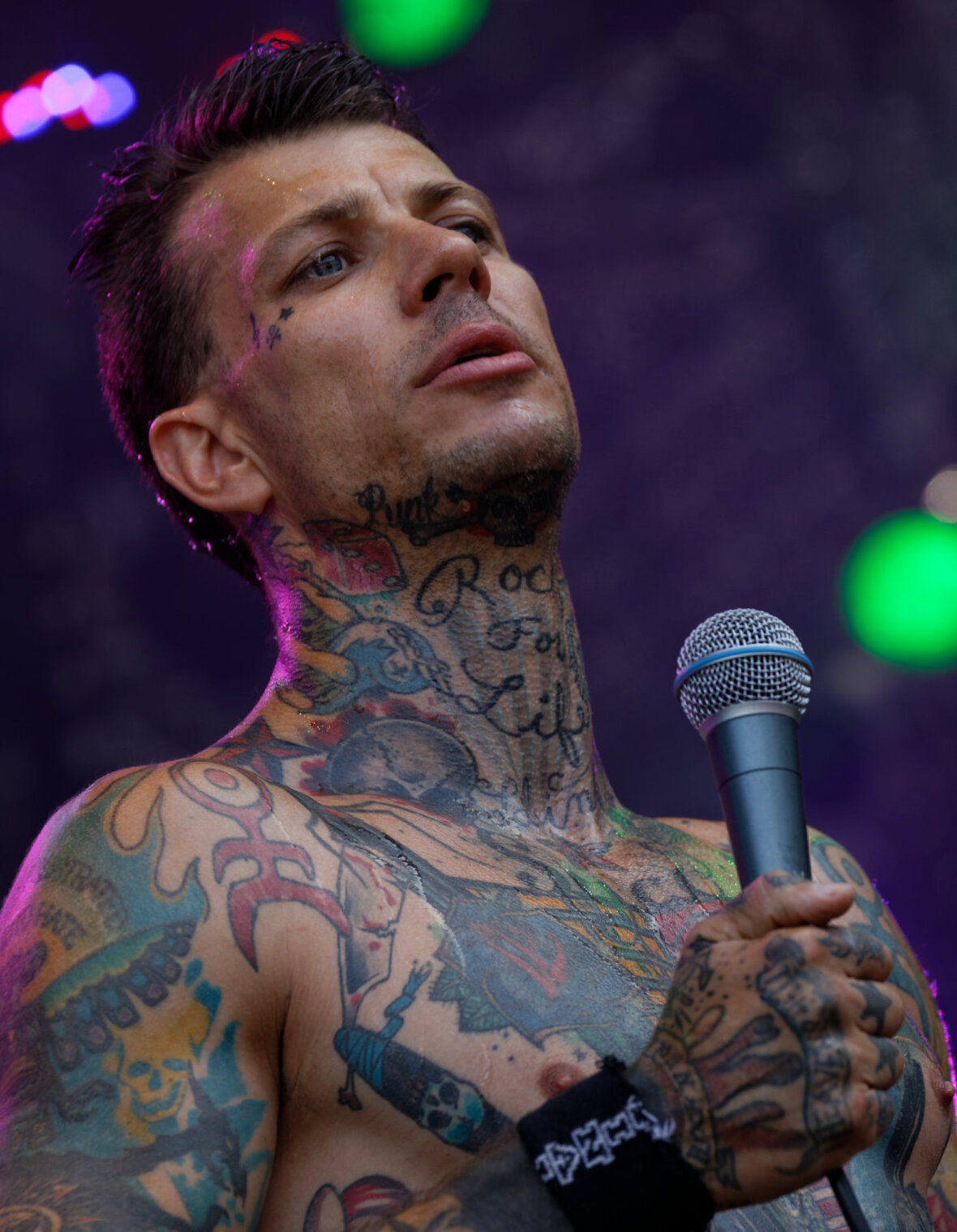
- House performing in 2013

Background information
- Also known as: Syco Mike; Mugshot Mike; Player 453
- Born: Michael Robert House; Columbus, Georgia, U.S
- Occupations: Musician; actor
- Instrument: Lead vocalist
- Years active: 1991–2016, 2023–present
- Formerly of: Snot (1991–1993); Lewa (1993–1996); Mugshot-76 (1996–2008); Pipes and Pints (2008–2012, 2012–2016)
- Award: Anděl Awards (2012)
- Website: Michael House website at the Wayback Machine (archived August 22, 2024)

Michael Robert House, known also as Syco Mike and Mugshot Mike, is an American musician and actor. House was in the Celtic punk band Pipes and Pints from 2008 to 2016.

== Career ==
House is from Columbus, Georgia. He moved to Prague to become a musician. House formed his first band in 1991 called Snot, where he performed until 1993. He then joined Lewa in 1994, then left in 1996. House finally formed the band Mugshot-76 with his friend Wax in 1996, and left in 2008.

=== Pipes and Pints ===
House joined the Celtic band Pipes and Pints in 2008 under the name Syco Mike. House left in 2012, but later returned in November on the same year. He played as the lead vocals. House won an Anděl Award with his band in 2012. House officially left in 2016.

== Acting career ==
House made his acting debut in November 2023, as a tattoo artist on Jimmy Kimmel Live!. In 2025, he played as Psycho Bob in the 2025 horror film Mickey's Slayhouse.

=== Beast Games ===
In 2024, he starred in the first season of the reality show Beast Games, as Player 453. He won the sixth place prize, which was $233,000 USD.
