= Beast Games lawsuit =

2024 class action lawsuit against MrBeast

Contestant 1, et al. v. MrB2024, LLC, et al.
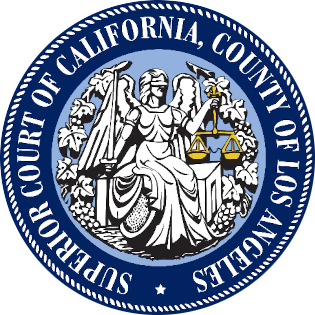
- Court: Los Angeles County Superior Court
- Full case name: Contestant 1, Contestant 2, Contestant 3, Contestant 4, Contestant 5, and Contestant 6 v. MrB2024, LLC, Off One’s Base, LLC, Amazon Alternative LLC, and Does 1-100, inclusive
- Started: September 16, 2024; 2 years ago

On September 16, 2024, a class action lawsuit—on behalf of five anonymous contestants (labeled as Contestants 1 to 5 in the lawsuit) of the Beast Games series on Prime Video—was filed in the Los Angeles County Superior Court against Jimmy "MrBeast" Donaldson (under his production company MrB2024, LLC), Off One's Base, LLC, Amazon Alternative, LLC, and 100 anonymous individuals. An additional contestant, labelled Contestant 6, and an additional defendant, MysticArt Pictures, LLC, were later added to the lawsuit. On May 10, 2025, MysticArt Pictures, LLC was dismissed from the suit.

The complaint alleged widespread mistreatment of the Beast Games contestants, including sexual harassment, lack of medical care, inadequate food, and unpaid expenses and wages, as well as misrepresentations about the number of contestants on the show.

== Background ==
=== Show ===
Beast Games is a reality competition series, released on Amazon Prime Video on December 19, 2024. The show was announced in March 2024 and the first round was filmed at Allegiant Stadium in Paradise, Nevada, U.S., where the contestants ate, slept, and lived. 2000 contestants arrived on July 18, 2024, to begin filming. The remainder of the show was filmed at Downsview Park Studios in Toronto, Ontario, Canada in August 2024. The budget of the show was reported to be $100 million, and the first place prize was $5 million.

=== Plaintiffs ===
The plaintiffs appear on the lawsuit as Contestant 1, Contestant 2, Contestant 3, Contestant 4, Contestant 5, and Contestant 6. Contestants 1 and 2 are residents of Los Angeles County, California. Contestants 3 and 4 are residents of the state of California. Contestant 5 and Contestant 6 are residents of the United States. All six are individuals that were employed by the production companies as contestants of Beast Games.

=== Defendants ===
James Stephen Donaldson, better known as MrBeast, is an American YouTuber, internet personality, and businessman. With over 510 million subscribers, he has the most-subscribed YouTube channel. MrB2024, LLC is a production company owned by Donaldson.

Off One's Base, LLC is an independent production company, and is one of the producers of Beast Games. Amazon Alternative, LLC creates unscripted television, and is a division of Amazon MGM Studios. The 100 anonymous individuals, referred to in the lawsuit as Does 1–100, are employees whose names were not known to the plaintiffs at the time they filed the lawsuit.

An additional defendant, MysticArt Pictures, LLC, a production and casting company, was later added to the lawsuit. On May 10, 2025, Mysticart Pictures, LLC was dismissed from the suit.

== Allegations ==
A number of sexual harassment claims have been made against the production companies. In addition, the contestants allege that they did not get paid adequately for their work, sometimes not getting paid at all. Contestants have also said they have not yet received promised prizes and compensation money. Contestants further said that they did not receive adequate amounts of food or medical care throughout the course of the show, despite many participants becoming injured. Contestants also stated that they had their phones and other personal belongings taken away from them prior to arriving to the stadium to film.

The complaint also alleged that contestants were made to provide false information and were misclassified as volunteers rather than employees to allow the production to obtain Nevada tax credits and avoid other taxes. In addition, the plaintiffs alleged that they were told that the competition would involve 1,000 participants, which was later revealed to them to mean 1,000 on the televised show out of an initial 2,000 participants.

As a result of the conditions they faced, contestants alleged that the conduct of the production companies and staff caused them "serious emotional distress".

== Response ==
A spokesperson for Donaldson said that:

The MrBeast promotional video shoot, which included over 2,000 participants, was unfortunately complicated by the CrowdStrike incident, extreme weather, and other unexpected logistical and communications issues, which we are currently reviewing, but we are grateful that virtually all of those invited to Toronto for our next production have enthusiastically accepted our invitation.

We have communicated directly with 97 percent of the 2,000 people who attended to ask for feedback, have launched a formal review of the process, and have taken steps to ensure that we learn from this experience and we are excited to welcome hundreds of men and women to the world’s largest game show in history.

The three named production companies have been contacted multiple times, including by Variety, the BBC, CNN, and CBS News. In all cases, Amazon declined to comment. In one case, MrBeast's representatives declined to comment, while on other occasions they did not reply to the request for comment. The BBC said they were unable to contact Off One's Base for comment.

On November 25, 2024, Donaldson replied to a user on X, stating that there are "tons of behind the scenes dropping when the show does to show how blown out of proportion these claims were", but that he "can't release it now because it would spoil the games". In an interview on Good Morning America on February 11, 2025, Donaldson responded, "I got to let the lawyers handle it, I can't comment on it", and added "But what I can say – I've personally talked to 700–800 contestants, they all want to come back, they all had a great time. And you can watch their content online and I think it speaks for itself."

== See also ==
- List of lawsuits involving MrBeast
