= Real Chemistry =

American holding company

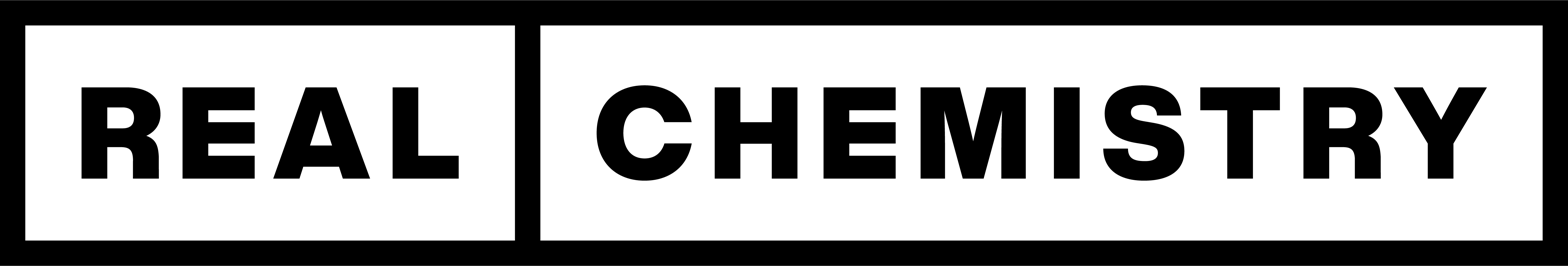
- Company type: Private
- Industry: Healthcare
- Founded: 2001; 25 years ago
- Number of locations: 10
- Key people: Jim Weiss, Founder and Chairman; Shankar Narayanan, CEO; Jennifer Gottlieb, Chief Client Officer
- Revenue: $555 million (2022)
- Number of employees: 2,000 (2022)
- Website: Official website

Real Chemistry, formerly known as W2O Group, is a global provider of marketing and analytics services, including public relations, to the healthcare and technology industries. Founded by Jim Weiss in 2001, Real Chemistry is an American company with global offices in Europe and Canada.

== Corporate history ==
Real Chemistry was founded as WeissComm Partners in 2001 by Jim Weiss as a one-person marketing consulting firm, with clients primarily in the healthcare industry. His firm grew quickly until 2008. According to Weiss, less favorable conditions in the healthcare industry led to a series of layoffs.

In response, the following year Weiss acquired creative services firm ODA and social media marketing firm, Common Sense Media Group, in order to diversify his interests and reduce reliance on the healthcare industry. That same year, Weiss re-formed the company under the acronym WCG, consolidating the two acquisitions under a new corporate umbrella. The acquired companies and the firm's revenues continued growing. By 2011 it had annual revenues of $48 million.

In 2012, WCG was re-structured again under a new holding company called W2O Group, which was made up of three companies: WCG, W2O Ventures, and Twist Mktg. The fourth company in the holding group, Brewlife, was formed the following year to focus on startup companies. The holding group had $75 million in annual revenues by 2013 and $82.6 million in 2014. In 2014 and 2015, W2O opened new offices in major U.S. and European cities.

In May 2016, a private-equity firm called Mountaingate Capital made an investment in W2O Group, which funded a series of acquisitions. Seven months after acquiring Fox Communications, W2O Group laid off founder Lynn Fox, who sued alleging gender discrimination.

In 2012, The Weiss Center was established at the S.I. Newhouse School of Public Communications at Syracuse University as a partnership between the university and Real Chemistry. The center aims to immerse students digital media education by developing programming in healthcare communications, influencer marketing, artificial intelligence, and analytics, focusing on their influence on society and business.

In June 2019, New Mountain Capital acquired an interest in W2O Group for an undisclosed amount. Following the acquisition, the company acquired Elysia Group, Discern Health and 21GRAMS.

The company acquired starpower LLC, an entertainment marketing agency, in 2020. In January 2021, Swoop, Inc., which specializes in pharmaceutical IT, and IPM.ai, a data and analytics company, were both acquired.

In March 2021, W2O Group was rebranded as Real Chemistry, and all subsidiaries were consolidated into the newly unified company. As a result of rapid acquisition activity in 2019, Real Chemistry has grown to employ over 2,000 people in 10 locations worldwide.

In January 2022, Shankar Narayanan took over as CEO, and founder Jim Weiss became chairman.

In April 2022, Real Chemistry acquired the conversational AI company conversationHEALTH.

In March 2023, Real Chemistry acquired TI Health, a data-driven marketing and predictive analytics company.

=== Acquisitions ===
Date	Company	Description	References
2009	ODA	Creative services	
2009	Common Sense Media Group	Social media marketing firm	
2012	Ravel	Data analytics; based in Austin	
2012	VM Foundry	Web and mobile development; based in Austin	
2013	Partners for Medical Education	Medical consultation	
2015	ARC2 Communications & Media	Boutique public relations firm; based in Los Angeles	
2015	Vintank	Social media and CRM software company	
2016	Pure Communications	Marketing consultancy	
2016	Marketeching Solutions	Social listening	
2017	Sentient Interactive	Digital media and analytics	
2019	Arcus Media	Medical analytics	
2019	ISO Health	Medical communications company	
2019	Radius Digital Science	Scientific digital creative agency	
2020	Symplur LLC	Social media analytics	
2020	Discern Health	Health Economics and Outcomes Research (HEOR) consulting firm	
2020	Elysia Group LLC	Health Economics and Outcomes Research (HEOR) consulting firm	
2020	21GRAMS	Pharmaceutical marketing agency	
2020	starpower LLC	Entertainment marketing agency	
2021	Swoop, Inc.	Pharmaceutical IT company	
2021	IPM.ai	Data and analytics company	
2022	conversationHEALTH	Pharmaceutical AI company	
2023	TI Health	Predictive analytics company	

== Operations and services ==
Real Chemistry provides marketing and tech-enabled global health services to healthcare and technology companies. The company operated through five subsidiaries: WCG, Twist, Pure, Sentient and Marketeching, but has since unified into Real Chemistry. WCG was the public relations arm. As of 2012, it was responsible for about 80 percent of the company's revenue. Twist is a 50-person division that initially served largely as a conflict and analytics division. The Brewlife division serves the company's startup and emerging technology clientele.

Real Chemistry is the second largest PR firm by revenue in O'Dwyer's annual rankings of U.S. agencies and is the largest in the healthcare sector as of 2023. More than 90 percent of its revenues are from U.S.-based clients. Healthcare tends to be its fastest growing practice area and was the firm's focus early on, though more recently the analytics practice has taken a larger role.

According to PR Week, the company's most-used services include "PR, analytics, and its CCX creative unit." It also started a multicultural practice in early 2015. One of Real Chemistry's software services is MDigitalLife, which stores data on the online activity of doctors and patients. It is used by pharmaceutical companies to understand sentiment in the healthcare field.
