= Beast Games =

Reality competition TV show

- Genre: Reality competition
- Created by: Jimmy Donaldson; Tyler Conklin; Sean Klitzner; Mack Hopkins
- Directed by: Tyler Conklin; Kate Douglas-Walker
- Creative director: Tyler Conklin
- Presented by: Jimmy Donaldson
- Countries of origin: United States; Canada
- Original language: English
- No. of seasons: 2
- No. of episodes: 20

Production
- Executive producers: Jimmy Donaldson; Michael Cruz; Sean Klitzner; Tyler Conklin; Matt Apps; Charles Wachter; Keith Geller; Joe Coleman; Rachel Skidmore; Chris Keiper; Joshua Kulic
- Cinematography: Jason Elliott; Russell Leggett; Peter Vidulich
- Editor: Mack Hopkins
- Production companies: Blink49 Studios; MrBeast; Amazon MGM Studios

Original release
- Network: Amazon Prime Video
- Release: December 19, 2024 – present

Beast Games is a reality competition television series created by YouTuber Jimmy "MrBeast" Donaldson, Tyler Conklin, Sean Klitzner, and Mack Hopkins. Hosted by Donaldson, Beast Games follows 1,000 contestants as they compete for $5 million, (Note: The prize for season 1 was later doubled to $10 million) advertised as the largest single cash prize in reality television history.

Inspired by the viral Netflix show Squid Game and Donaldson's viral video "$456,000 Squid Game in Real Life!", the first two episodes of Beast Games were released on Amazon Prime Video on December 19, 2024, with the first full season consisting of ten episodes released weekly on Thursdays. On the same day, Donaldson also released a video of tryouts for the game show on his YouTube channel titled "2,000 People Fight for $5,000,000", where he cut the number of people participating from 2,000 to 1,000 in a series of challenges. On January 25, 2025, Donaldson uploaded a video titled "Each Minute One Person is Eliminated", following 20 people previously eliminated from the Beast Games show to participate and compete again for a total prize of $500,000.

Several contestants alleged they were mistreated during production, resulting in a lawsuit against Donaldson's company and several others. While the show was received poorly by critics, season 1 became one of Amazon Prime Video's most viewed shows.

In May 2025, Beast Games was renewed for two more seasons, with filming for season 2 running from June until August. The second season premiered on January 7, 2026.

== Production ==
=== Development ===
On March 18, 2024, Jimmy Donaldson, also known as MrBeast, announced that he had secured a $100 million deal with Amazon MGM Studios to produce a reality television series titled Beast Games for Prime Video. The series was created by Donaldson, Tyler Conklin, Sean Klitzner, and Mack Hopkins. Applications for the show opened on May 5, 2024. Donaldson serves as the host and executive producer. The budget is reported to be over $100 million.

Casting for season 2 of Beast Games started around March 2025. It was reported in May 2025 that Beast Games was to have another two seasons, though the show had not yet been officially renewed. Donaldson stated in an interview that he was "100 per cent" sure there would be future seasons with Prime Video. Mike Hopkins, head of Amazon MGM, stated at the Milken Institute Global Conference: "We’re going to do a couple more seasons of Beast Games, I think, soon." Later in May, the show's renewal for a second and third season was officially announced.

=== Filming ===
External videos
- 2,000 People Fight For $5,000,000
- Every Minute One Person Is Eliminated

Filming began with the first round, which was shot through July 18–22, 2024, inside of Allegiant Stadium in Las Vegas, with a total of 2,000 contestants attending it. This round is released on YouTube. The Beast City part of the competition that was featured in the first four, sixth, eighth and ninth episode of the TV series as well as a second YouTube video promoting the series featuring 20 eliminated contestants competing for $500,000, was filmed with the remaining 1,000 contestants at Downsview Park Studios in Toronto, Ontario, Canada, in August of that year. The "Beast Island" part of the competition featured in the fourth to sixth episodes of the show was filmed at the uninhabited La Vivienda Island, which is located in the Pearl Islands, Panama.

The filming broke 44 Guinness World Records, including the largest physical cash prize on set ($5,000,000), the most prize money turned down on a competitive reality TV show ($1,000,000), the largest prize fund awarded for a competitive reality TV show ($10,000,000), and the most money won in a single episode of a competitive reality TV show ($2,020,000), and a page in the Guinness World Records 2026 edition book was focused on the show.

Filming for season 2 began in Las Vegas in June 2025, and was completed in August 2025.

Part of season 2 features a crossover with the CBS reality series Survivor. Filmed prior to Survivor 50: In the Hands of the Fans, the Survivor production team hosted a series of challenges for Beast Games, with Survivor host Jeff Probst appearing as a co-host as part of the crossover. As part of the crossover, Donaldson also appeared in an episode of Survivor 50 as a Celebrity Fan, introducing a twist.

=== Legal issues ===
Contestants complained that they were denied food, water, medication, and beds during the production of the show. Additionally, dozens reported that various injuries took place during the first filming sessions, as well as mistreatment, sexual harassment, and not being paid for overtime. On September 16, 2024, a class action lawsuit was filed in the Los Angeles Superior Court.

According to a December 2024 Rolling Stone report on the working conditions for Beast Games published earlier that month, a portion of a tower exterior fell on a crew member on September 9, 2024. Later that month, the Ontario Ministry of Labour confirmed that it had opened an investigation into an on-set industrial incident on September 11, 2024. It stated that two of the employers, Blink 49 Studios and Manhattan Beach Studios, were each issued a "requirement". The Toronto Police Service also released a statement saying that they had been called to set for the incident but were not investigating as there was not a criminal element.

== Cast ==
Adapted from the Amazon MGM Studios press release. Presenters and producers are as follows:

=== Presenters ===
- Jimmy Donaldson (host)
- Chandler Hallow (co-host)
- Nolan Hansen (co-host)
- Karl Jacobs (co-host)
- Tareq Salameh (co-host)
- Mack Hopkins (co-host)

=== Producers ===
- Matt Apps
- Joe Coleman
- Tyler Conklin
- Michael Cruz
- Jimmy Donaldson
- Keith Geller
- Mack Hopkins
- Chris Keiper
- Sean Klitzner
- Joshua Kulic
- Rachel Skidmore

=== Guest ===
==== Season 1 ====
- Lil Yachty (in Episode 5)

==== Season 2 ====
- Jeff Probst (in Episode 4)
- Druski (in Episode 5)

=== Contestants ===
Some players participated in more than one season.

Player	Contestants	S1	S2
831	Jeffrey Randall Allen	1st	18th
830	Twana Barnett	2nd	51st
974	Gage Gallagher	3rd	51st
424	Courtney Ferris	6th	51st
566	JC Gallego Iori	7th	14th
380	Dean "Deano" Viana	11th	51st
539	Akira Andrews	13th	94th
952	Mia Speight	19th	21st
406	Karim Arafa	22nd	80th
991	Jeremy T. Grant	22nd	85th

== Episodes ==
Season	Episodes	Originally released			Winner	Runner–up	Prize
Season	Episodes	First released	Last released	Network	Winner	Runner–up	Prize
1	10	December 19, 2024	February 13, 2025	Amazon Prime Video	Jeffrey Randall Allen	Twana Barnett	$10,009,244
2	10	January 7, 2026	February 25, 2026	Amazon Prime Video	Tyler Lucas	Cory Sims	$5,100,000

=== Season 1 (2024–25) ===
No. overall	No. in season	Title	Original release date
1	1	"1,000 People Fight for $5,000,000"	December 19, 2024
2	2	"493 People Trapped In My City"	December 19, 2024
3	3	"The Solitary Experiment"	December 26, 2024
4	4	"The Golden Ticket"	January 2, 2025
5	5	"Fight to Win a Private Island"	January 9, 2025
6	6	"Physical, Mental, Chance...Your Choice"	January 16, 2025
7	7	"The Elimination Train"	January 23, 2025
8	8	"Betray Your Friend for $1,000,000"	January 30, 2025
9	9	"Bribe Your Way to the Finale"	February 6, 2025
10	10	"$10,000,000 Coin Flip"	February 13, 2025

=== Season 2 (2026) ===
No. overall	No. in season	Title	Original release date
11	1	"Strong vs Smart Compete for $5,000,000"	January 7, 2026
12	2	"Choose Your Fate"	January 7, 2026
13	3	"The Obstacle Course"	January 7, 2026
14	4	"The Survivor Takeover"	January 14, 2026
15	5	"Ask For Anything You Want"	January 21, 2026
16	6	"Hearts Will Be Smashed"	January 28, 2026
17	7	"Bury Me Alive"	February 4, 2026
18	8	"Would You Steal $1,000,000?"	February 11, 2026
19	9	"Trust Nobody"	February 18, 2026
20	10	"$5,000,000 Decision"	February 25, 2026

== Release ==
The qualifier video "2,000 People Fight for $5,000,000" was released on MrBeast's Main YouTube Channel on December 19, 2024.

Beast Games season 1 debuted on Amazon Prime Video on December 19, 2024, and consisted of ten episodes, released weekly. Season 2 premiered on Amazon Prime video on January 7, 2026, and also consists of ten episodes which released weekly through February 2026.

== Reception ==
The series became Prime Video's most watched unscripted series ever and its second largest series debut of 2024 behind Fallout, getting 50 million viewers over the course of 25 days. Amazon noted that half of the show's audience came from outside the United States.

=== Season 1 ===
Season 1 of Beast Games was released on Amazon Prime Video between December 2024 and February 2025 as ten episodes, released weekly. It became Prime Video's most watched unscripted series ever and its second largest series debut of 2025, though it was received poorly by critics. Several contestants alleged they were mistreated during production, resulting in a lawsuit against Donaldson's company and several others.

On review aggregation website Rotten Tomatoes, the series has an approval rating of 20% based on 10 critic reviews, with an average rating of 5/10. Metacritic, which uses a weighted average, gave it a score of 38 out of 100 based on five critics, indicating "generally unfavorable" reviews. Several reviewers critiqued Donaldson's performance as loud and shallow and the show's lack of focus on its contestants. Naomi Fry of The New Yorker wrote that the use of contestants' numbers instead of their names made it difficult to empathize with them, unlike other reality shows. IGN, The Guardian, Vox, and PC Gamer criticized the show for closely following the premise of Squid Game while stripping away its dystopian tone.

The financial aspects of the show have also come under scrutiny. Katie Notopoulos of Business Insider enjoyed the show, but she worried that it could communicate to children the lack of value in money. Lauren Saunders of the National Consumer Law Center and Andrew Kushner of the Center for Responsible Lending criticized sponsor MoneyLion, a financial tech and cash advance company, for advertising to a young audience, which Kushner said were more susceptible to "the slick marketing" of the finance industry. Jeff Yang similarly argued that the sponsorship would allow MoneyLion's owner, Gen Digital, to target groups in MrBeast's audience facing "dire economic precarity".

Some critics have analyzed the political implications of the show. According to Yang, while Squid Game was creating contextual critiques of oligarchs and exploiting disadvantaged people, Beast Games is unwittingly glorifying these concepts. Patrick Freyne of The Irish Times compared the giving away of islands to contestants in the fifth episode to colonialism.

In response to IGN's negative review, Donaldson wrote "Yeah, sad one person who doesn't like me can just label something a thousand people poured their lives into a 2 out of 10 when it's clearly not." Donaldson similarly questioned the gap between audience and critic scores on Rotten Tomatoes.

=== Season 2 ===
Reception for the second season was more positive than that of the first. On the review aggregator website Rotten Tomatoes, 78% of 9 critics' reviews are positive. The website's consensus reads: "A twist-filled return, Beast Games offers a feast of cliffhangers."

Hannah J Davies of The Guardian rated the season 2/5 stars, finding the season tedious and immature.
