= Jungle Grrrl =

American actress, stuntwoman, and professional wrestler

Personal information
- Born: Erica Porter; October 31, 1974 (age 51) Columbia, Maryland, U.S.

Professional wrestling career
- Ring name(s): Jungle Grrrl; Erica Porter; X Terminator
- Billed height: 5 ft 7 in (1.70 m)
- Billed weight: 154 lb (70 kg)
- Trained by: Ultimate Pro Wrestling: Ultimate University
- Debut: 2000
- Retired: 2019

Erica Porter (born October 31, 1974) is an American actress and former professional wrestler. Throughout her career, she performed for Women Of Wrestling under the ring name Jungle Grrrl. She held the WOW World Championship for three and half years, the longest in the title's history.

== Professional wrestling career ==
Porter began her career in 2000 for Women Of Wrestling (WOW) season 1 as Jungle Grrrl. She would feud with Terri Gold. In 2001, she left the promotion.

In 2002, Jungle Grrrl debuted for Ultimate Pro Wrestling. From 2003 to 2004, she won the UPW Women's Title twice. She was also the IZW Women's Championship from 2003 to 2004, holding it for 601 days. She was inactive from wrestling for many years.

In 2013, she returned to WOW, where she won the WOW World Championship, defeating Lana Star on March 9. She held the title for 1,300 days, making her the longest champion in WOW history. She dropped the title to Santana Garrett on September 29, 2016.

She lost to Tessa Blanchard for the vacant WOW World Championship on October 11, 2018.

In 2019, Jungle Grrrl retired from wrestling.

== Personal life ==
In June 2020, Porter was diagnosed with stage 4 breast cancer.

== Championships and accomplishments ==
- Women of Wrestling
  - WOW World Championship (1 time)
- Ultimate Pro Wrestling
  - UPW Women's Championship (1 time)
- Impact Zone Wrestling
  - IZW Women's Championship (1 time)

== Filmography ==
=== Movies ===
Year	Film	Role	Notes
2007	Skid Marks	Strip Club Dancer	
2002	Spider-Man	Bone-ette	
