= Barbi Hayden =

American professional wrestler

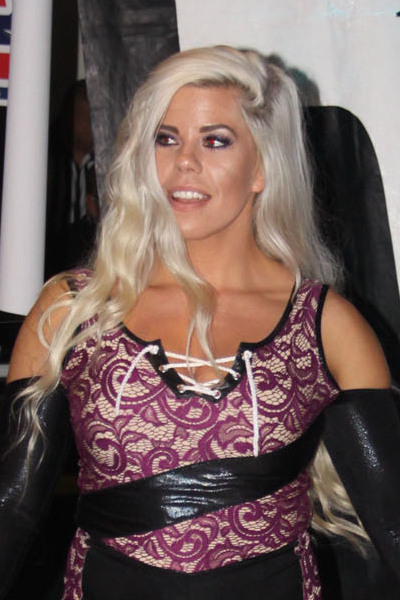
- Hayden in 2019

Personal information
- Born: Callee Wilkerson; October 2, 1990 (age 35)

Professional wrestling career
- Ring name(s): Barbi Hayden; Abilene Maverick
- Billed height: 5 ft 5 in (1.65 m)
- Billed weight: 140 lb (64 kg)
- Billed from: College Station, Texas
- Debut: 2010

Callee Wilkerson (born October 2, 1990) is an American professional wrestler, known by her ring names Barbi Hayden and Abilene Maverick. She is best known for her time in Impact Wrestling and currently wrestles for Women of Wrestling (WOW).

== Professional wrestling career ==
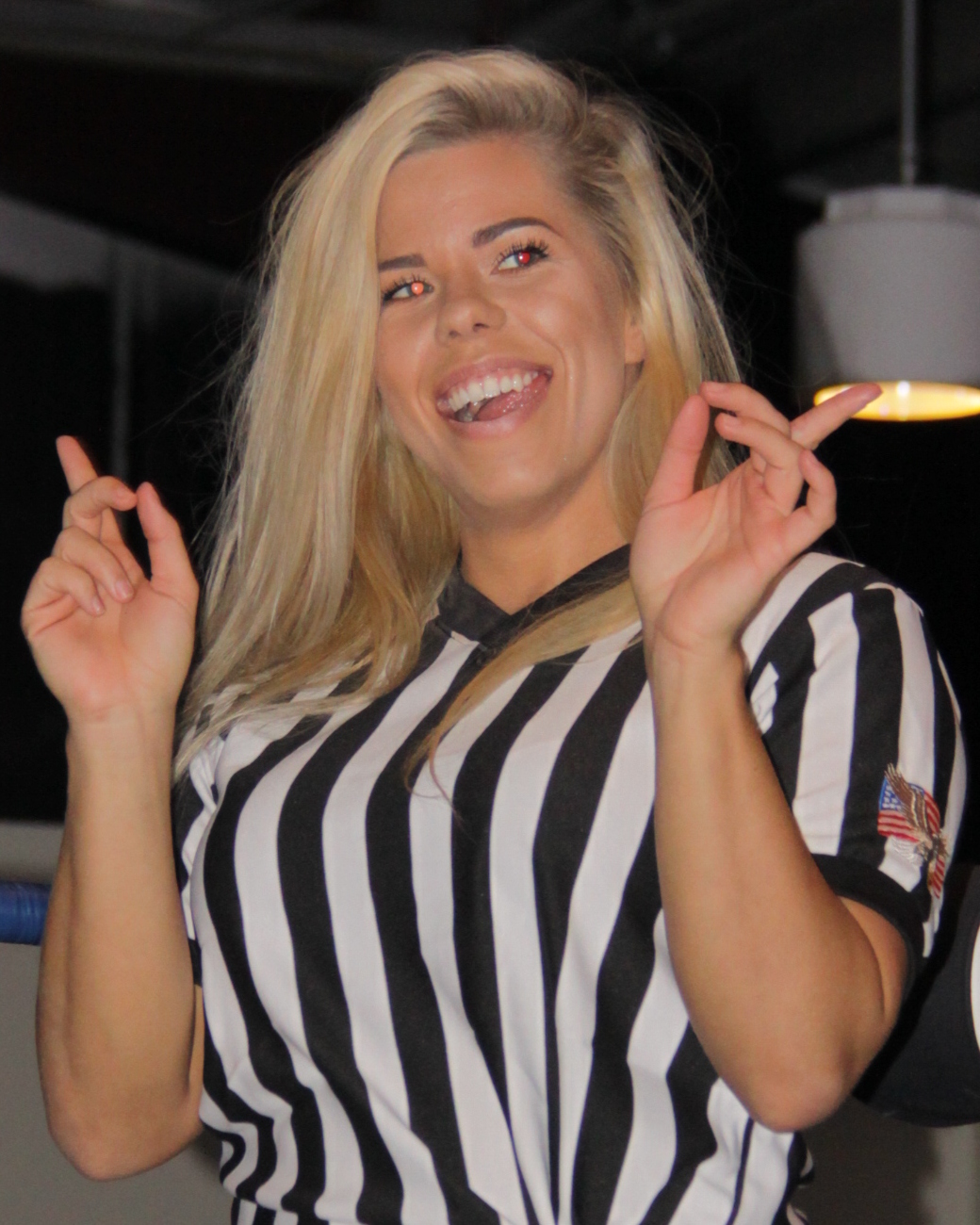
Hayden as a referee at an independent wrestling show in 2018

Barbi Hayden made her debut and on June 1, 2013, at Ring of Honor she debuted in a one on one match against Athena Reese but was not successful.

On January 25, 2014, Hayden won the NWA World Women's Championship for the first time, after defeating Kacee Carlisle. She made her first successful title defense on February 8 against Santana Garrett at WSU Mutiny. Hayden held the title 378 days, when she successfully defended the title eleven times, before losing the title to Garrett on February 7, 2015.

On July 31, 2015, Hayden lost to Tessa Blanchard in the first women's match to ever be televised in China. On January 21, 2016, Hayden made her debut for Shine Wrestling at SHINE 32, defeating Renee Michelle. The following month on February 26, at SHINE 33 Hayden defeated Leah Vaughan.

Hayden appeared at TNA One Night Only: Knockouts Knockdown 2016 Pay Per View. At this event, Hayden defeated Raquel in a singles qualifying match, for a spot in the Queen of the Knockouts Gauntlet Battle Royal. Facing Jade, Allysin Kay, Allie, Madison Rayne and Marti Belle and Rebel and Rosemary, which was won by Jade.

Hayden joined Women of Wrestling (WOW) under the name Abilene Maverick, The Governor's Daughter. After debuting as a face, Maverick began turning heel and started to bully Stephy Slays, committing acts such as spilling tea on her, and feigning an injury to avoid facing her in the ring. Following Slays' victory over The Disciplinarian, the evil Maverick attacked Slays backstage, cementing her heel turn.

On July 22, 2019, Hayden announced her retirement from pro wrestling to focus on performing stage shows in Las Vegas. In 2023 Maverick made her return to Women of Wrestling (WOW) where she captured the WOW World Title.

== Championships and accomplishments ==
- Anarchy Championship Wrestling
  - ACW American Joshi Championship (1 time)
  - ACW Televised Championship (1 time)
- National Wrestling Alliance
  - NWA World Women's Championship (1 time)
- Lone Star Championship Wrestling
  - NWA Lonestar Women's Championship (4 times)
- NWA Texoma
  - NWA Texoma Women's Championship (1 time)
- Pro Wrestling Illustrated
  - Ranked No. 12 of the top 50 female wrestlers in the PWI Female 50 in 2014
- Women of Wrestling
  - WOW World Championship (1 time)
