= Tamie Sheffield =

American professional wrestler, actress and model

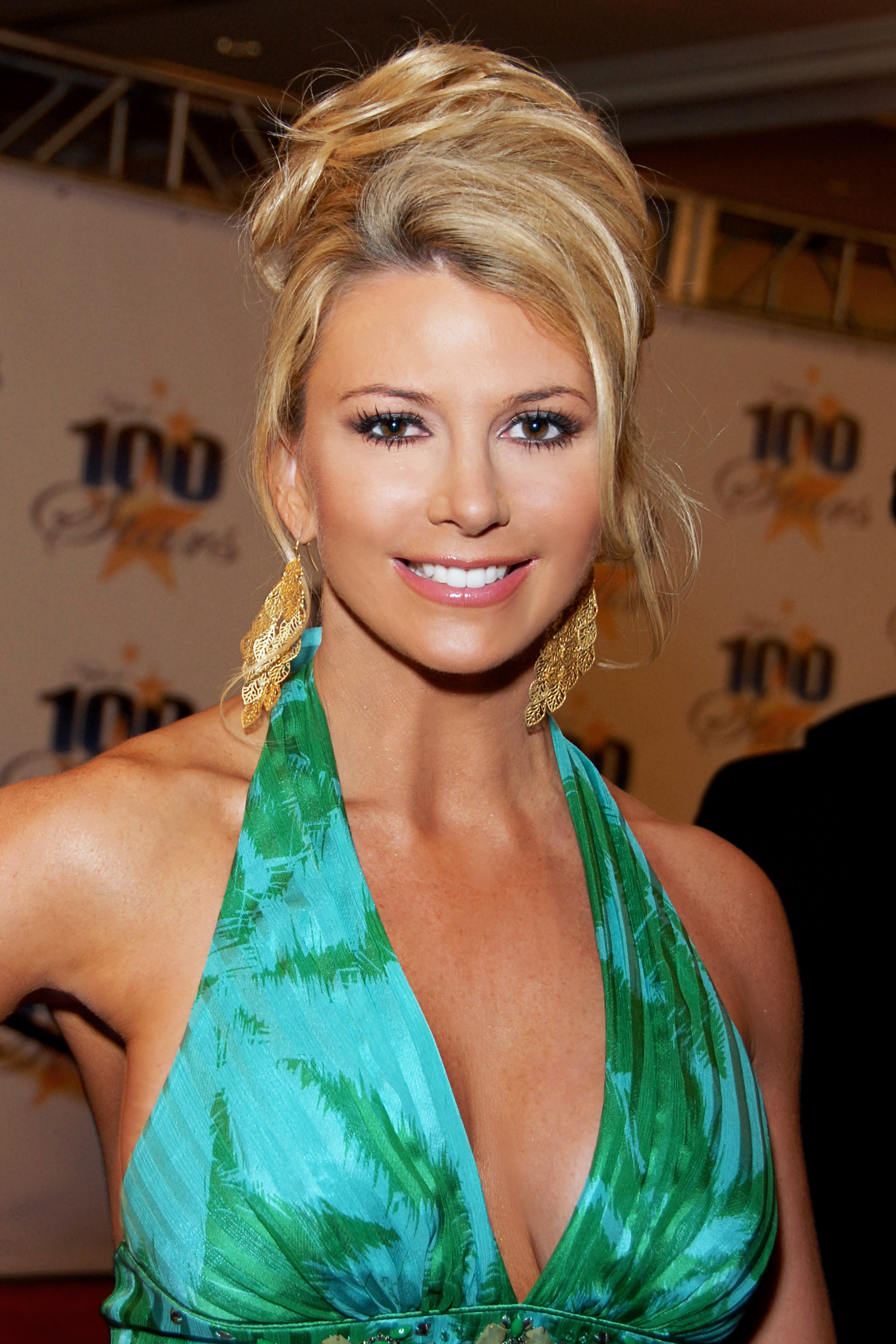
- Tamie Sheffield attending the 19th Annual "Night of 100 Stars" Oscar Viewing Party at the Beverly Hills Hotel in February 2009
- Born: July 27, 1970 (age 55); Mechanicsburg, Pennsylvania, U.S.
- Professional wrestling career
- Ring name: Sandy
- Billed height: 5 ft 8 in (173 cm)
- Billed weight: 145 lb (66 kg)
- Trained by: Selina Majors; Peggy Lee Leather
- Debut: 2000
- Retired: 2007

Tamie Michelle Sheffield (born July 27, 1970) is an American film actress, model and former professional wrestler.

== Career ==
Sheffield was born in Mechanicsburg, Pennsylvania and graduated from Mechanicsburg Senior High School in 1988. She graduated cum laude from West Chester University with a degree in Elementary Education. She was also a cheerleader from junior high through college. Sheffield gave campus tours and was in the Phi Sigma Sigma sorority.

Sheffield became a professional wrestler in the California-based Women of Wrestling (WOW) promotion. Using the name Sandy, Sheffield was given the gimmick of a Baywatch-like lifeguard along with a tag team partner named Summer. The duo was collectively known as The Beach Patrol.

Sheffield started her acting career in 1999 in the movie Wildflower and appeared in Slammed, Cheerleader Massacre, The Deviants and Black Tie Nights. She also hosted two Lingerie Bowls. In 2003, Sheffield was a contestant on the third season of NBC's Fear Factor, becoming the winner of her episode. She returned later in the season for the semi-final, where she was unsuccessful.
