= Jessicka Havok =

American professional wrestler

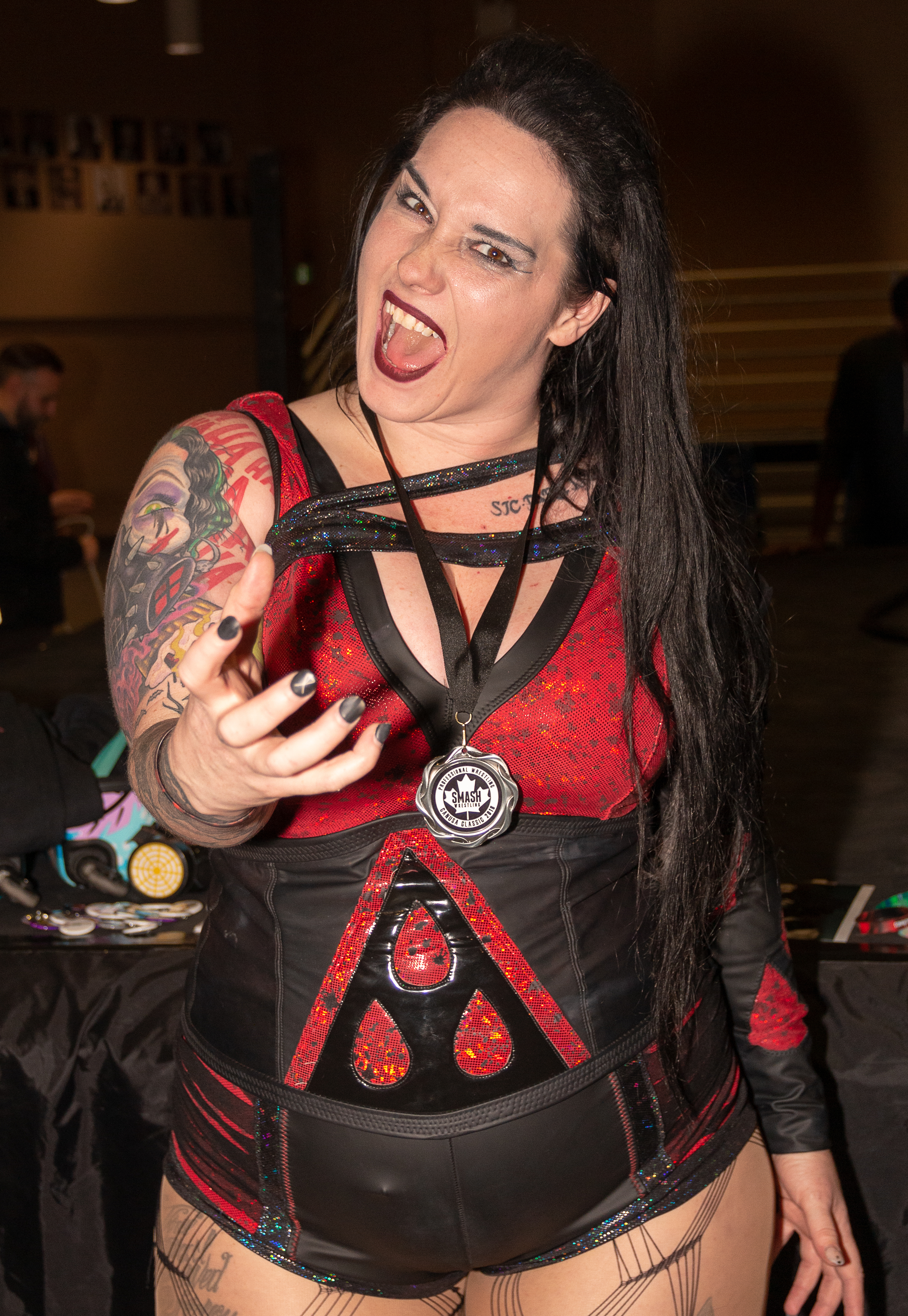
- Havok in 2018

Personal information
- Born: Jessica Cricks; June 20, 1986 (age 40) Massillon, Ohio, U.S.
- Spouse: Sami Callihan (engaged)

Professional wrestling career
- Ring name(s): Havok; Jessicka; Jessicka Havok
- Billed height: 6 ft 0 in (1.83 m)
- Billed weight: 264 lb (120 kg)
- Billed from: Massillon, Ohio; Defiance, Ohio
- Trained by: Shasta; Justin Diaz; Lones Oaks
- Debut: 2004

Jessica Cricks (born June 20, 1986) is an American professional wrestler, better known by her ring name as Jessicka Havok. She is best known for her time in Total Nonstop Action Wrestling where she is a former three-time TNA Knockouts World Tag Team Champion, and was a former one-time TNA Knockouts Champion. She regularly performed for several independent promotions, including Shine Wrestling and Women Superstars Uncensored, where she is a former two-time WSU Champion.

== Professional wrestling career ==
=== Early career (2004–2009) ===
Cricks debuted in 2004, using the ring name Jessicka Havok. During the first years of her career, she made appearances for Mega Championship Wrestling, Cleveland All-Pro Wrestling, and Ohio Championship Wrestling.

=== Women Superstars Uncensored (2009–2014) ===
Havok debuted in Women Superstars Uncensored (WSU) in 2009, where she formed a tag team with Hailey Hatred. Havok and Hatred won the WSU Tag Team Championship on August 22 at As the World Turns, by defeating Alicia and Brooke Carter. The pairing successfully defended the championship in a rematch against Alicia and Carter, before losing the championship to the team of Angel Orsini and Mercedes Martinez. As part of WSU, Havok was part of Rain's Army, helping Rain attack her rivals. Throughout 2010, Havok was undefeated in singles competition, including victories over ODB and Amy Lee.

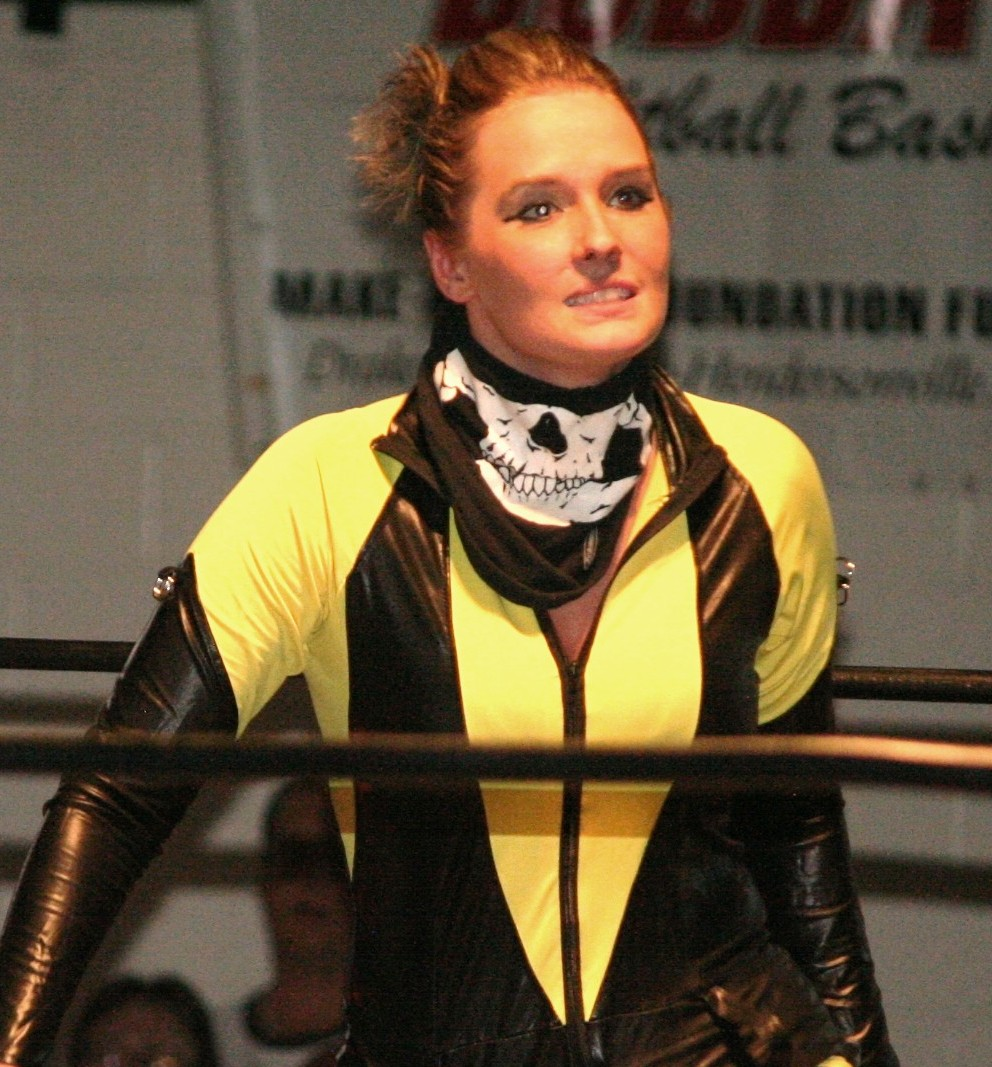
Havok in 2012

After leaving Rain's Army in late 2010, Havok defeated Rain in a singles match at The 4th Anniversary Show in March 2011. Havok then moved into a feud with Alicia, with the duo facing off in a series of matches throughout mid-2011. Havok defeated Alicia in an Uncensored Rules match, and a Last Woman Standing match at Havok vs. Alicia III: Last Woman Standing ended in a draw.

On September 24, Havok defeated Rain to win the WSU Spirit Championship. Havok joined forces with Sassy Stephie and Allysin Kay to form The Midwest Militia and at the Breaking Barriers II internet pay-per-view, The Midwest Militia defeated Team WSU (Mercedes Martinez, Alicia, and Brittney Savage) in a War Games match. After retaining the WSU Spirit Championship against Becky Bayless in January 2012, Havok defeated Martinez to win the WSU Championship in March, holding both championships simultaneously. On April 28, Havok lost the championship back to Martinez, despite having her foot under the bottom rope. Havok regained the championship that same day, defeating Martinez and Savage in a three-way match.

On June 16, Havok lost the WSU Spirit Championship to Marti Belle. That same day, at the Uncensored Rumble V pay-per-view, Havok defeated Martinez to retain the WSU Championship in the first women's casket match. As part of a talent exchange, The Midwest Militia began competing for the Canadian promotion NCW Femmes Fatales (NCWFF) in 2012. At NCWFF's ninth show in July 2012, The Midwest Militia defeated Courtney Rush, Xandra Bale, and Cat Power in a six-woman tag team match. Havok retained the WSU Championship against Athena on February 9, 2013, at An Ultraviolent Affair. On May 11, Havok defeated Sami Callihan in an intergender match. On February 7 and 8, 2014, Havok retained the WSU Championship against The Alpha Female and Shanna.

On May 1, 2014, Havok was stripped of the WSU Championship and "banned for life" from competing in the company. Two months later, on July 12, Havok defeated Mia Yim in an Uncensored Rules match to revoke her ban from the promotion.

=== Combat Zone Wrestling (2013) ===
After WSU signed a talent-sharing agreement with Combat Zone Wrestling (CZW), Havok debuted for the promotion at the 14th Anniversary Show, where she and Adam Cole lost to LuFisto and Sami Callihan in a mixed tag team match. She quickly moved into a feud with Ohio is for Killers member Nevaeh, with their first match at Wanted in March ending in a double countout. Their second match took place at the Proving Grounds 2013 show in May, which Havok lost.

=== Other promotions (2012–2014) ===
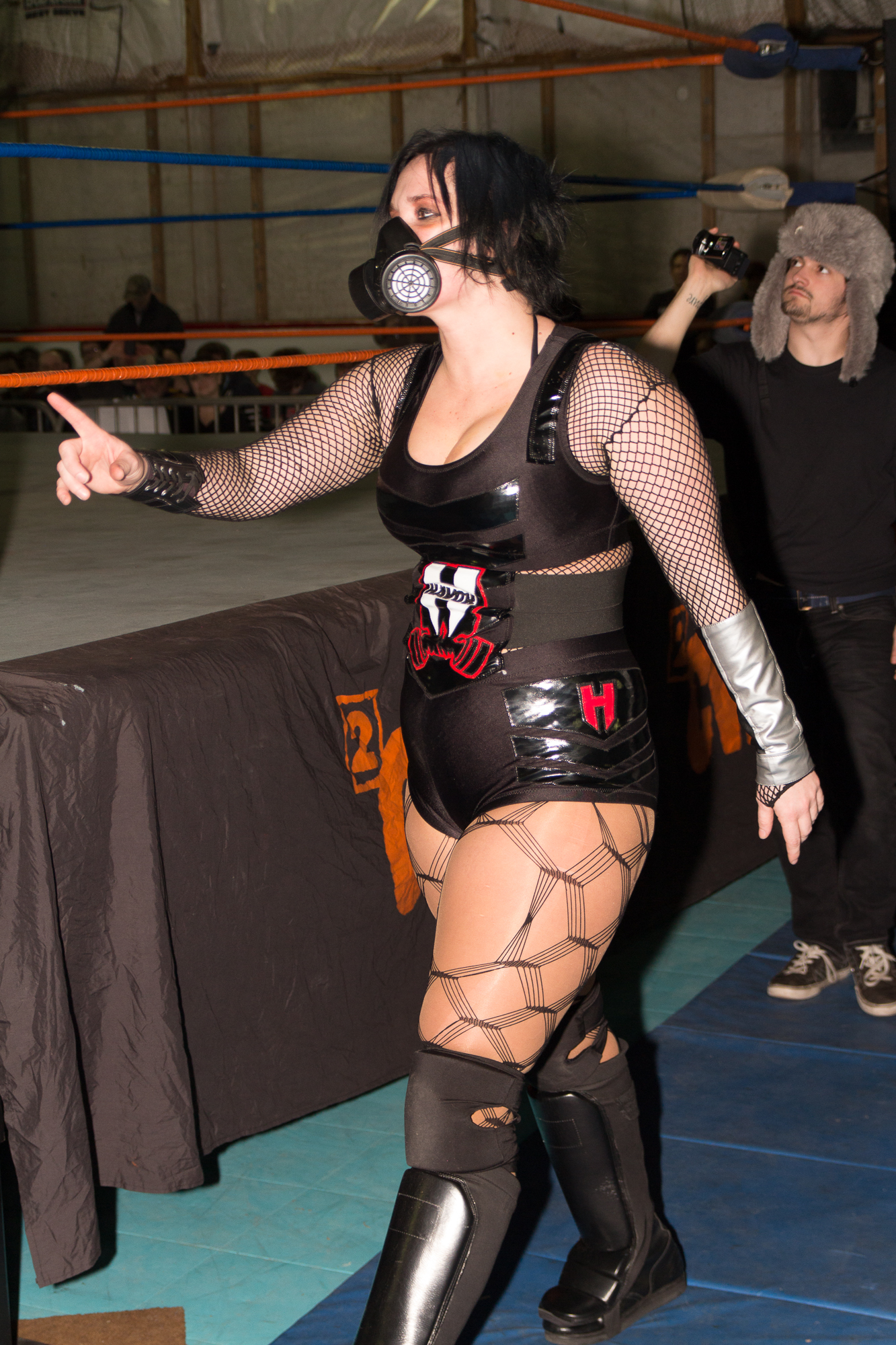
Havok in February 2013, wearing a gas mask as part of her "contagion-themed" character

In 2012, Havok began competing for the newly opened Shine Wrestling, debuting for the promotion during their second event against Reby Sky. After Havok attacked Sky with a chair, the duo began feuding, and at Shine 8, Havok lost to Sky to end the feud. She qualified for the tournament to determine the inaugural Shine Champion by defeating Madison Eagles at Shine 9. At Shine 11, Havok advanced to the semi-finals of the tournament after winning her match against Saraya Knight by disqualification. Later that night, she faced Rain in the semi-final, but lost by countout after being attacked by Knight. At the following show, Havok defeated Ivelisse to earn the number one contendership, and unsuccessfully faced Rain for the Shine Championship. At Shine 13, Havok and long-time ally Allysin Kay began teasing a feud when Kay accidentally clotheslined Havok during a match. On the following show, Kay attacked Havok, leading to a singles match at Shine 15, which ended in a no contest. After their next match ended in a double countout, Kay and Havok faced off in an Ybor City street fight in April 2014, which ended in a no contest when Havok was struck by a car as part of the storyline.

Havok made a surprise appearance during Shimmer Volume 53 on April 6, 2013, where she attacked Serena Deeb. This would set up a match later on in the evening where she, Sassy Stephanie and Nevaeh were defeated in a six-woman tag team match by Regeneration X (Leva Bates and Allison Danger) and Deeb. The following week, Havok defeated Deeb in a singles match following interference from Hatred and Mademoiselle Rachelle. In a rematch at Volume 56, Havok lost to Deeb.

At Full Impact Pro's Declaration of Independence internet pay-per-view in July 2013, Havok was part of a four-way match won by Maxwell Chicago and also including Amasis and Latin Dragon.

=== Total Nonstop Action Wrestling (2014–2015) ===
==== Knockouts Championship reign (2014) ====
Cricks first appeared for Total Nonstop Action Wrestling, as part of the One Night Only: Knockouts Knockdown 2 pay per-view in May 2014. Under her Jessicka Havok name and gimmick, she was defeated by Madison Rayne. In August, Impact began airing vignettes on Impact Wrestling, teasing Cricks' debut. Cricks, now known simply as Havok, made her first appearance on the September 3 episode of Impact Wrestling, attacking both Gail Kim and Taryn Terrell after their title match. On the September 10 episode of Impact Wrestling, Havok made an appearance where she attacked Kim and Brittany and took Kim's Impact Knockouts Championship, which led to a brawl between the two later on the same night. At No Surrender, Havok won a battle royal to become the number one contender to Kim's championship. On September 16, Havok defeated Kim at the Impact Wrestling tapings to win the championship; the match aired on tape delay on October 1. During the time she held the championship, Havok defended and retained the championship against Velvet Sky at Bound for Glory on October 12, against Madison Rayne on an episode of Impact Wrestling that aired on October 15, and against Gail Kim on an episode of Impact Wrestling that aired on November 5. On the November 19 episode of Impact Wrestling, Havok lost the championship to Taryn Terrell in a triple-threat match that also involved Gail Kim. On the January 7, 2015, episode of Impact Wrestling, Havok was lastly eliminated from a battle royal by Taryn Terrell. After the match, Havok attacked Terrell but was then stopped by the returning Awesome Kong. After weeks of tension between Havok and Kong, the two faced off in a steel cage match on the Lockdown edition of Impact Wrestling on February 6, in which Kong defeated Havok. After months of inactivity, on July 30, Cricks confirmed on her Twitter account that she was no longer working for Impact Wrestling.

=== Independent promotions and Japan (2016) ===
Havok made her first appearance on ROH televised episode that aired on December 14, 2016, in a losing effort against Mandy Leon with a distraction from Deonna Purrazzo. Havok chokeslamed Leon and Purrazzo after the match.

On April 9, 2017, Havok started her first tour with Japanese promotion World Wonder Ring Stardom. On April 30, she took part in the 2017 Cinderella Tournament, where she and World of Stardom Champion Io Shirai eliminated each other in the second round, after wrestling to a draw. On May 14, Havok teamed with Tessa Blanchard to unsuccessfully challenge Hiroyo Matsumoto and Jungle Kyona for the Goddesses of Stardom Championship.

=== WOW - Women Of Wrestling (2018–2019) ===
It was confirmed that Havok would join Women of Wrestling (WOW)'s taping in October 2018 on AXS TV. Havok had her first match on WOW which aired on February 15, 2019, where she successfully defeated Fire. Havok received a match for the WOW World Championship against the champion Tessa Blanchard, however, this match ended in no contest with the involvement of The Beast and Jungle Grrrl. Through the second seasons of WOW on AXS TV, Havok teamed with Hazard in the WOW World Tag Team Championship tournament and made it through the finales where they lost to Adrenaline and Fire.

=== Return to Impact/TNA (2019–2024) ===
==== Storyline with Su Yung (2019–2020) ====
On the June 7 episode of Impact!, Havok made her return accompanied by James Mitchell, as she interrupted a match between Rosemary and Taya Valkyrie by attacking them both. Afterwards, it was revealed that Havok had joined forces with Mitchell and Su Yung. Havok received a Knockout Championship match on Slammiversary XVII in a four-way Monster's Ball match along with the champion Valkyrie, Rosemary and Yung. As Valkyrie retained her title, Havok's alliance with Yung began to see fractures. After Slammiversary, Havok and Yung's alliance turned into a rivalry, with both facing each other for the first time on Impact Wrestling on the September 6 episode of Impact! in a match that ended in a no-contest, which continued with a brawl between the two. The feud of Havok and Yung reached its climax on the September 20 episode of Impact!, when the two faced each other in a no disqualification match, with Havok being victorious. After the match, Havok and Yung continued to brawl backstage, ending with Havok wrapping a noose around Yung's neck and hanging her over the staircase rail. Havok actions caused a character change in Yung, as Yung made an appearance on the October 29 episode of Impact! without her makeup, introducing herself as Susie.

On the March 24, 2020, episode of Impact! a fight between Havok and Yung ended in a betrayal from Mitchell, as he sent both to the Undead Wasteland. The two were able to escape thanks to Rosemary and kill him, ending their feud in the process.

==== Storyline with Nevaeh (2020–2021) ====
On April 28, 2020, during the second night of Rebellion, Havok faced Rosemary in a Full Metal Mayhem match, which was won by Rosemary. During the match, Nevaeh made her appearance as she watched the match from distance. On the May 26 episode of Impact!, Nevaeh interfered a match between Havok and Kimber Lee, as Nevaeh stopped Lee from hitting Havok with a brass knuckles. Havok and Nevaeh continued to attack Lee afterwards, establishing themselves as a team. Havok and Nevaeh found themselves feuding with Fire N Flava (Kiera Hogan and Tasha Steelz), which led into a no disqualification match on the August 11 episode of Impact!, where Hogan and Steelz were victorious. At Hard to Kill on January 16, 2021, Havok and Nevaeh lost to Fire N Flava in a match to crown the new Impact Knockouts Tag Team Champions.

On the March 30 episode of Impact, Havok was attacked by Nevaeh after they lost a match to Fire N Flava, ending their alliance.

==== Decay & The Death Dollz (2021–2024) ====
On the Countdown to Rebellion pre-show, Rosemary teamed up with Havok to defeat Kimber Lee and Susan. On May 15, at Under Siege, Havok lost to Deonna Purrazzo for the Knockouts title. On the July 15 episode of Impact!, Havok was inducted into Decay by James Mitchell. Two days later, on the Countdown to Slammiversary pre-show, Havok and Rosemary defeated Hogan and Steelz to win the Impact Knockouts Tag Team Championship.

On August 20, at Emergence, Decay defeated Fallah Bahh, No Way, Evans and Steelz in an eight-person tag match. On September 18, at Victory Road, Havok and Rosemary successfully retained their Knockouts Tag Team Championship against Evans and Steelz. At Knockouts Knockdown, Havok and Rosemary successfully retained their tag titles against The Influence (Madison Rayne and Tenille Dashwood). On October 23, At Bound for Glory, Havok and Rosemary lost the titles to The IInspiration (Cassie Lee and Jessica McKay).

On the July 14, 2022, episode of Impact!, after being rescued by Rosemary and Taya Valkyrie from the Undead Realm, she was re-introduced as Jessicka with a different look then usual, wearing bright makeup and her hair being pink. Jessicka made her first appearance in her new character on the August 25 episode of Impact!, where she defeated Alisha. On October 7, at Bound for Glory, Jessicka alongside Valkyrie, now known as The Death Dollz, defeated the Knockouts World Tag Team Champions VXT (Chelsea Green and Purrazzo) to win the title. During their reign, The Death Dollz defended their title against various contenders, such as Savannah Evans and Tasha Steelz and The Hex (Allysin Kay and Marti Belle).

On February 26, 2023, during the tapings of Impact!, Rosemary alongside Taya Valkyrie defended the Knockouts World Tag Team Championship under the Freebird Rule against The Coven (KiLynn King and Taylor Wilde) to which they lost, ending The Death Dollz's reign at 142 days. On April 16, at Rebellion, Havok and Rosemary challenged The Coven for their title, but were unsuccessful.

Jessicka and Rush would later revert back to Havok and Rosemary as Decay. They would then win the TNA Knockouts World Tag Team Championship for the third time on January 13, 2024 at Hard To Kill, defeating MK Ultra (Killer Kelly and Masha Slamovich), only to lose it back to them a month later. At Rebellion, Decay (Havok and Rosemary) lost to Spitfire (Dani Luna and Jody Threat) failing to win the titles. At Under Siege, Havok lost to Ash by Elegance. After the match, Ash by Elegance destroyed Havok with a steel chair before leaving her unconscious via a DDT on the steel ramp. This would be Havok's final appearance for the company, as her profile was removed from the roster page on TNA's website announcing her departure.

=== Lucha Libre AAA Worldwide (2024) ===
On June 15, 2024 at Triplemanía XXXII: Tijuana, Havok debuting teamed with Rosemary and Tasha Steelz as representatives of TNA, defeating Las Toxicas (Lady Flammer, La Hiedra, and Lady Maravilla). On August 8, 2024, Crazzy Steve and Havok made their debut in Verano de Escandalo earning the opportunity for the AAA World Mixed Tag Team Championship after defeating a Aero Star and Estrellita and Negro Casas and Dalys. On October 6 at Héroes Inmortales, they managed to win the titles after defeating Abismo Negro Jr. and Lady Flammer, being their first AAA championship as a team.

== Personal life ==
On June 20, 2021 (her 35th birthday), Cricks got engaged to fellow Impact wrestler Sami Callihan.

== Championships and accomplishments ==
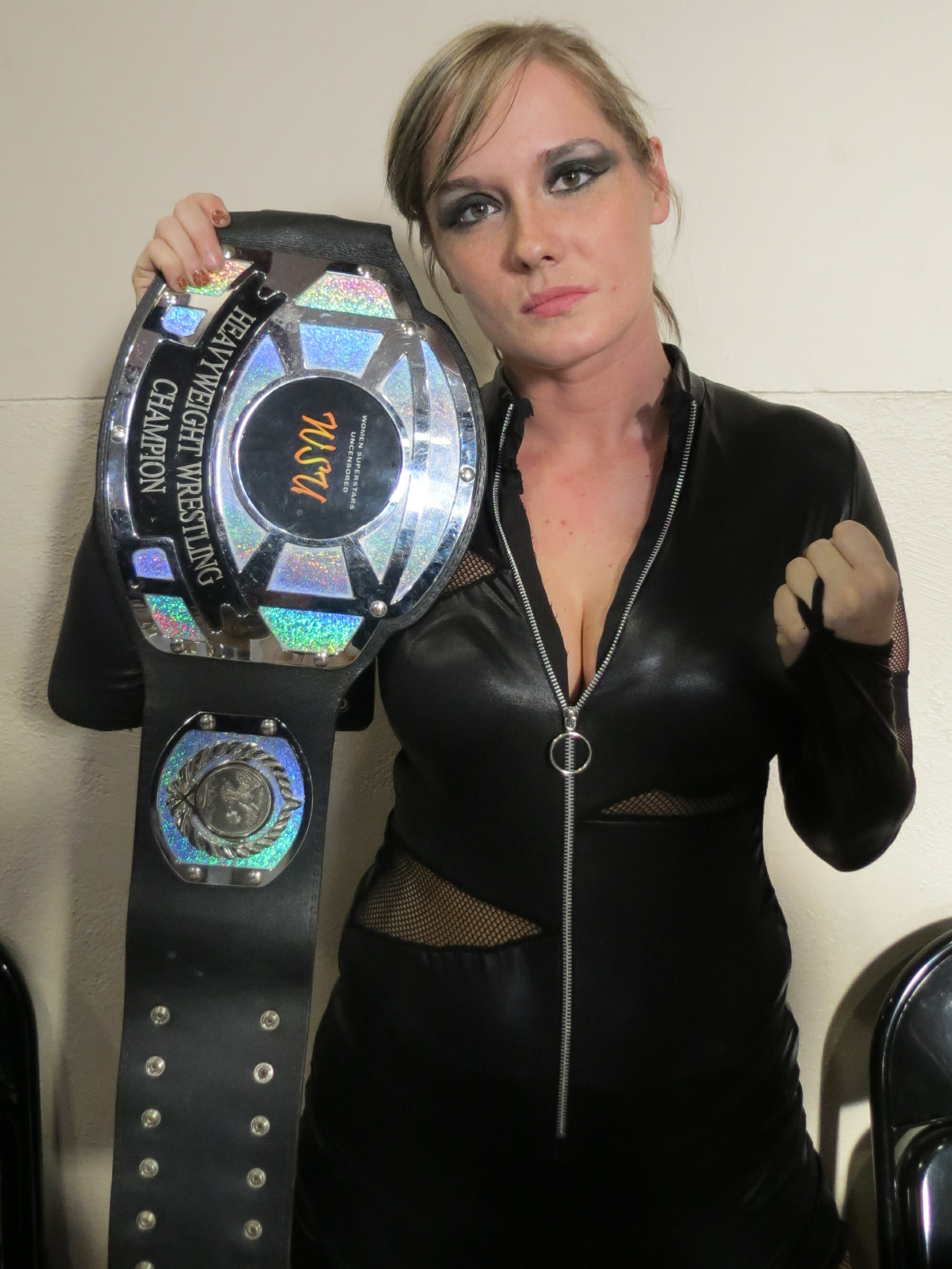
Havok as WSU Champion in 2012

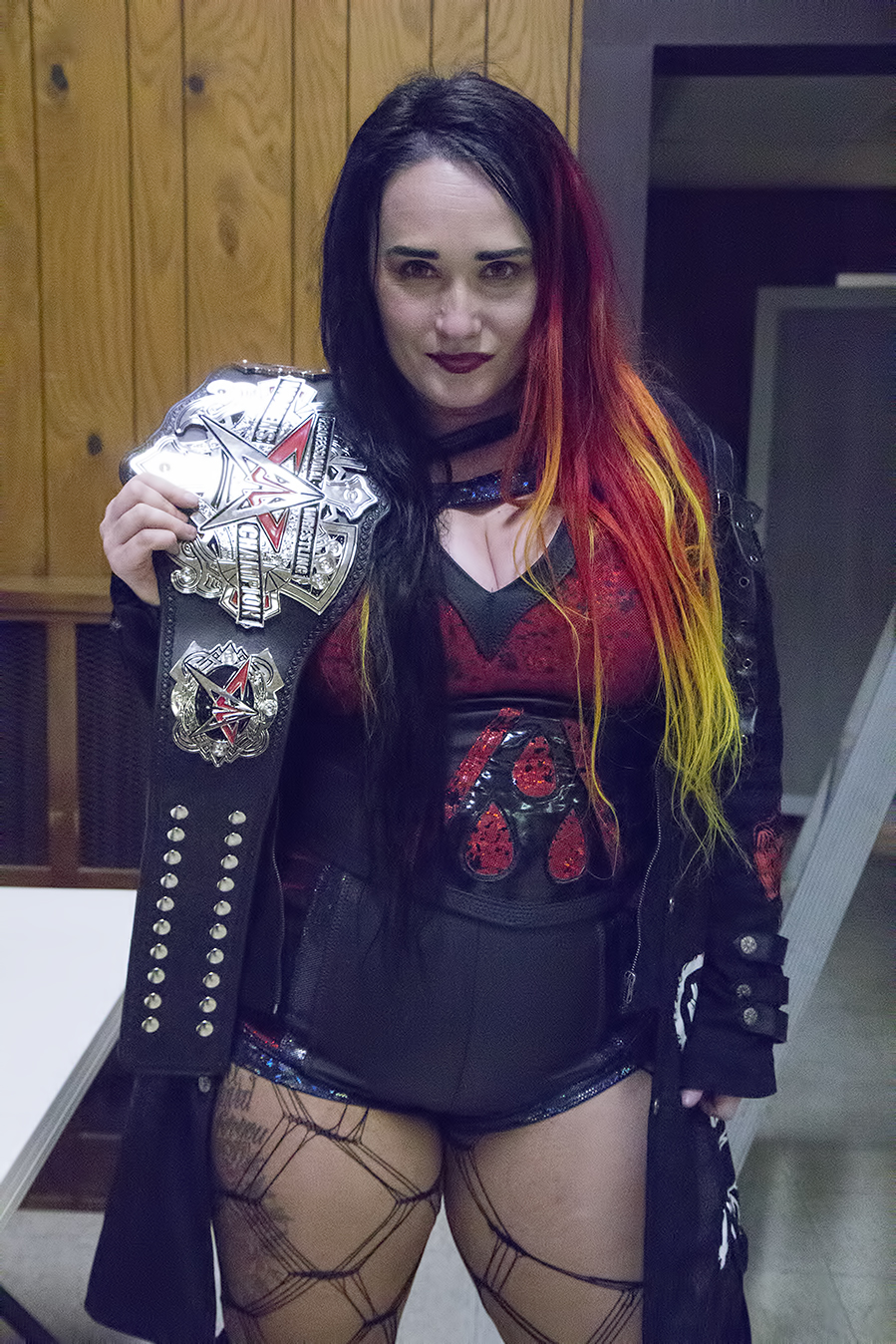
Havok as AAW Women's Champion in 2017

- AAW: Professional Wrestling Redefined
  - AAW Women's Championship (2 times)
  - AAW Women's Championship Tournament (2017)
- Absolute Intense Wrestling
  - AIW Women's Championship (1 time)
- Lucha Libre AAA Worldwide
  - AAA World Mixed Tag Team Championship (1 time) – with Crazzy Steve
- Main Event World League
  - MEWL Cruiserweight Championship (1 time)
- Pro Wrestling Illustrated
  - Ranked No. 4 of the top 50 female wrestlers in the PWI Female 50 in 2013
- Ring Divas
  - Fight Girl Championship (1 time)
- Rise Wrestling
  - Guardians of RISE Championship (1 time, final) – with Neveah
  - Rise Year End Award (1 time)
    - Tag Team of the Year (2019) – with Neveah
- Rockstar Pro Wrestling
  - Rockstar Pro Trios Championship (1 time) – with Dave Crist and Sami Callihan
- The Wrestling Revolver
  - The F'n Catalina Wrestling Mixer Tournament (2019)
- Total Nonstop Action Wrestling / Impact Wrestling
  - Impact/TNA Knockouts World Tag Team Championship (3 times) – with Rosemary (2), Taya Valkyrie and Rosemary (1)
  - TNA Knockouts Championship (1 time)
  - Impact Year End Award (1 time)
    - Knockouts Tag Team of the Year (2022) with Rosemary and Taya Valkyrie
- Women Superstars Uncensored
  - WSU Championship (2 times)
  - WSU Spirit Championship (1 time)
  - WSU Tag Team Championship (1 time) – with Hailey Hatred
