= Bobbi Billard =

American professional wrestler, actress and model

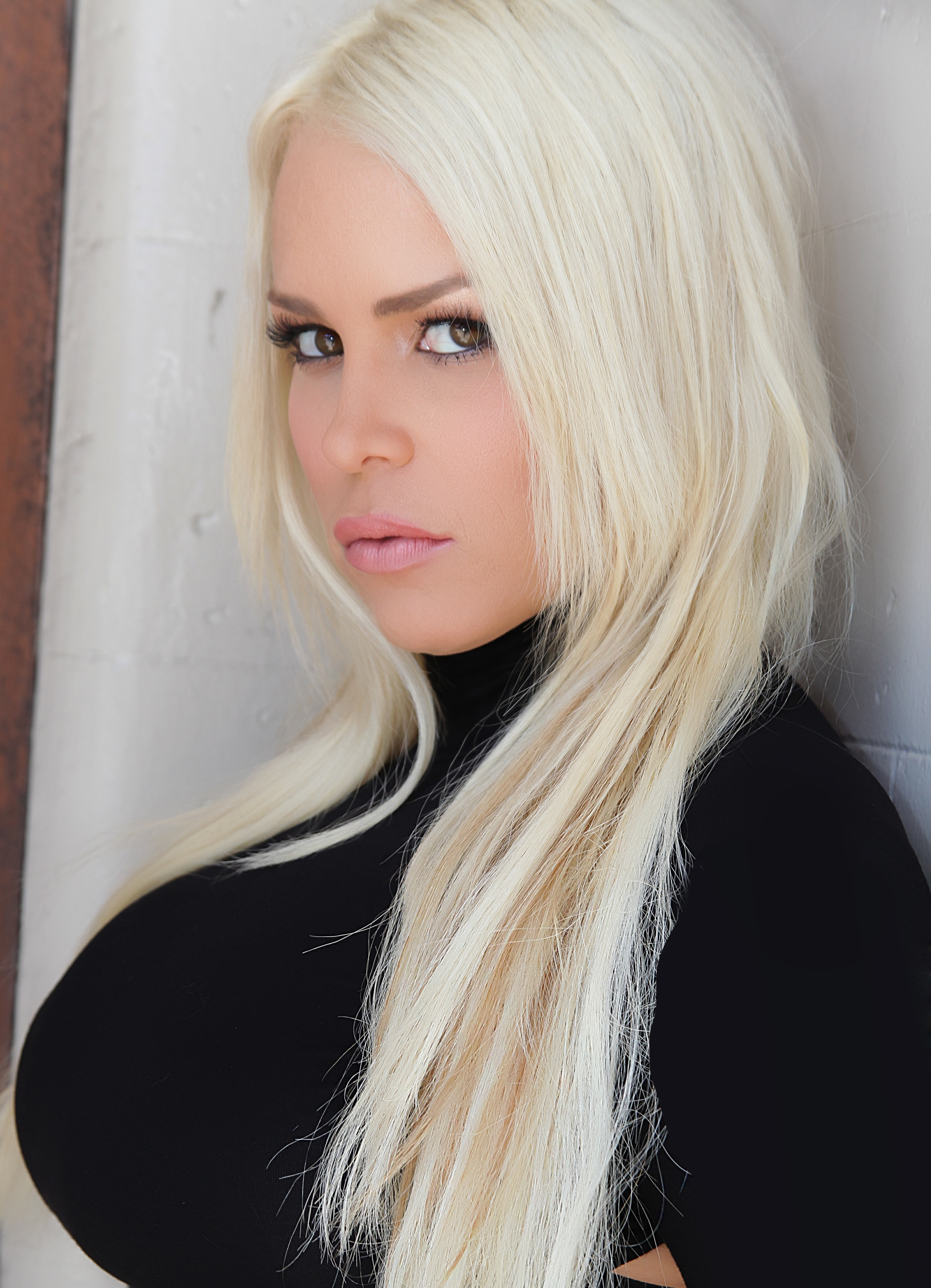
- Billard in May 2010
- Born: Barbara Anne Billard; December 12, 1975 (age 50); Austin, Texas, U.S.
- Modeling information
- Hair color: Blonde
- Eye color: Brown
- Professional wrestling career
- Ring name(s): Summer; Bobbi Bling Bling; Bobbi Billard
- Billed height: 5 ft 8 in (1.73 m)
- Billed weight: 130 lb (59 kg; 9.3 st)
- Billed from: Austin, Texas
- Trained by: Selina Majors; Peggy Lee Leather; Ivory; Jacqueline
- Debut: 2000
- Retired: 2005

Barbara "Bobbi" Anne Billard (born December 12, 1975) is an American model, actress, published author and former professional wrestler.

== Career ==
=== Acting career ===
Billard's first commercial, "Green Bay Watch", was for Diet Dr Pepper and was shown during Super Bowl XXXV. She had a few small parts on TV shows like Howard Stern's Son of the Beach and then in cinema.

=== Modeling career ===
Billard began modeling at the age of 12. Her first paid modeling job was at the age of 19 for Jones Performance Fuel Systems. From there, she was on the cover of Mini-truckin' magazine, as well as appearing in calendars for Hot Bike and Street Rodder.

On the MySpace social network, she had over one and a half million "friends", making her one of the most popular people on the site.

She has appeared in Muscular Development, Muscle Mag and American Curves, as well as in two series of Benchwarmer trading cards. She made music video appearances in Blues Traveler's "Girl Inside My Head", Kottonmouth Kings' "King Klick", Yung Berg's "Sexy Lady" and Fireball's "What I Want" with Bob Sinclar.

=== Wrestling career ===
Billard became a professional wrestler in the California-based Women of Wrestling (WOW) promotion. Using the name Summer, Billard was given the gimmick of a Baywatch-like lifeguard along with a tag team partner named Sandy. The duo was collectively known as The Beach Patrol.

Billard signed with World Wrestling Entertainment (WWE) in December 2003 and entered their developmental territory, Ohio Valley Wrestling. She received training from Ivory and Jacqueline. She was released after receiving an injury. In 2004, she had neck fusion surgery.

== Personal life ==
Billard was born in Austin, Texas and later moved to Richardson, Texas and then to Mission Viejo, California. She now lives in Las Vegas, Nevada.

In July 2016, Billard was named part of a class action lawsuit filed against WWE which alleged that wrestlers incurred traumatic brain injuries during their tenure and that the company concealed the risks of injury. The suit was litigated by attorney Konstantine Kyros, who has been involved in a number of other lawsuits against WWE. The lawsuit was dismissed by US District Judge Vanessa Lynne Bryant in September 2018.

In March 2019, Billard announced that she had explanted her breast implants after she said her body began rejecting them. She has since been concentrating her efforts around building awareness for Breast Implant Illness (BII).

== See also ==
- List of glamour models
