= Jwaundace Candece =

American actress

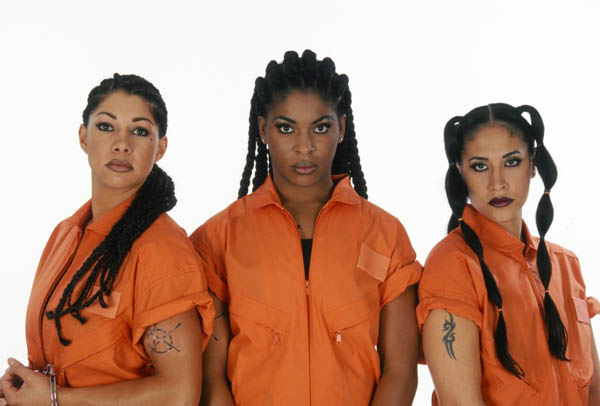
- Candece (middle) as part of Caged Heat, a professional wrestling tag team
- Born: Jwaundace Candece Belcher; January 13, 1978 (age 48); Birmingham, Alabama, U.S.
- Occupations: Actress, stunt woman, professional wrestler
- Years active: 2000–present
- Children: 1
- Professional wrestling career
- Ring name(s): Delta Lotta Pain; Cobra
- Billed height: 5 ft 7 in (170 cm)
- Trained by: Selina Majors; Peggy Lee Leather
- Debut: 2000
- Website: www.jwaundace.com

Jwaundace Candece (born January 13, 1978) is an American actress, stunt woman and semi-retired professional wrestler.

== Career ==
=== Professional wrestling ===
Candece began her professional wrestling career with Women of Wrestling from 2000 to 2001, using the ring name Delta Lotta Pain. She was part of the tag team Caged Heat, alongside Loca. On January 20, 2001, they became the WOW Tag Team Champions, and remained so until the promotion ceased television production that March. Upon the promotion's relaunch in 2013, Caged Heat returned as champions, but dropped the title to The All American Girls (Amber O'Neal and Santana Garrett). In a 2014 interview, Candece stated that she was still affiliated with WOW, but combining professional wrestling with her stunt work was time consuming, so she chose to continue the latter.

=== Stunt career ===
She is the first black American woman to reach over 150 film, television and commercial credits performing stunts as herself but mainly for some of Hollywood's top actresses. She has performed stunts for Viola Davis, Pam Grier, Regina King, Queen Latifah, Oprah Winfrey, Taraji P. Henson, Jennifer Hudson, Gabrielle Union, Whoopi Goldberg, Mo'Nique, Phylicia Rashad, Tyra Banks, Retta, Brandy Norwood and Hayley Marie Norman, to name a few. Her stunts have included fight scenes, stair falls, ratchets, high speed stunt driving, car crashes, car hits, riding motorcycles, fire burns and many more. She has worked with some of the top stunt coordinators in the industry.

=== Acting ===
Candece is currently an actress, and can be seen as Shaundra in the Netflix film Naked, which premiered on August 11, 2017. The film stars Marlon Wayans and Regina Hall. She is formerly known for her recurring role in ABC's Resurrection as Mrs. Camille Thompson, a "return" and mother to Agent J. Martin Bellamy (Omar Epps). Her "return" family includes daughter Jenny Thompson (Nadej Bailey) and husband, Mr. Wallace Thompson (Shawn Shepard).

She can also be seen in 20th Century Fox's Let's Be Cops as JaQuandae, a comedy starring Jake Johnson and Damon Wayans Jr. Her line "That's what you get" became a major marketing tool when they began promoting the movie trailer.

Candece has also made guest and supporting appearances on CBS' CSI: Crime Scene Investigation, Cinemax's Banshee, Fox's Mad TV, BET's Let's Stay Together and IFC's Stan Against Evil. In 2016, she had a minor appearance in Barbershop: The Next Cut. In 2017, she played a nurse in Vengeance: A Love Story. The same year, she appeared in the award winning I, Tonya as the boxer who knocks out Tonya Harding (Margot Robbie). She has a supporting role in Paradise Highway in the role of "Tesia" opposite Juliette Binoche and Morgan Freeman.

She has a master's degree in Psychology and a credential to teach reading.

== Championships and accomplishments ==
- Women of Wrestling
  - WOW Tag Team Championship (2 times) – with Loca
  - WOW Tag Team Championship Tournament (2001) – with Loca
  - 2025 NAACP Nominee for "Best Stunt Performance" doubling Pam Grier in Amazon's "THEM:The Scare" series
  - 2x SAG Awards Winner and 6x Nominee
