= WOW World Championship =

Women's wrestling world championship

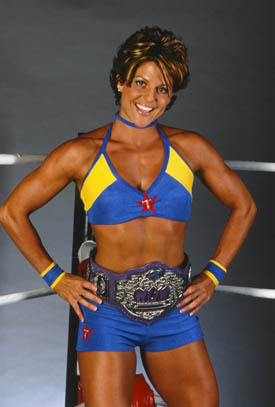
- The inaugural two-time WOW World Champion Terri Gold with the original belt design

Details
- Promotion: Women of Wrestling (WOW)
- Date established: September 1, 2000
- Current champion: Santana Garrett
- Date won: October 22, 2025
Statistics
- First champion: Terri Gold
- Most reigns: 2 reigns: The Beast; Santana Garrett; Terri Gold; Penelope Pink
- Longest reign: Jungle Grrrl (1,300 days)
- Shortest reign: Penelope Pink (8 days)

The WOW World Championship is a women's professional wrestling world championship created and promoted by the American professional wrestling promotion Women of Wrestling (WOW). The current champion is Santana Garrett, who is in her second reign.

== History ==
On the September 1, 2000, episode 1 of WOW Season 1, Terri Gold won a 20-woman battle royal to become the inaugural champion.

List of the 20-woman participants: Bronco Billie, Caliente, Charlie Davidson, The Disciplinarian, EZ Rider, Farah the Persian Princess, Hammerin' Heather Steele, Ice Cold, Jane Blond, Jungle Grrrl, Lotus, Paradise, Roxy Powers, Sandy, Selina Majors, Slam Dunk, Sunny (later Wendi Wheels), Terri Gold, Tanja the Warrior Woman and Thug.

After WOW was revived on May 29, 2012, Lana Star was presented as the champion through the tapings of 2013, which aired in 2016.

On October 11, 2018, the title was vacated after a three-way match between the previous champion Santana Garrett, who defended against Jungle Grrrl and Tessa Blanchard, where both Garrett and Jungle Grrrl pinned Blanchard. Blanchard would defeat Jungle Grrrl in a singles match to win the vacant title.

On the December 4, 2022, episode 25 of WOW Season 8, Penelope Pink won 10-woman Gauntlet match for the vacant WOW World Champion, in Los Angeles, CA, Comic-Con, which aired on tape delay on March 4, 2023.

List of the 10-woman participants: the first was eliminating (without aired episode): Jessie Jones, Princess Aussie, Reina Del Rey and Wrecking Ball. And the remaining wrestlers with the face to the title match: Crystal Waters, Foxxy Fierce, Robbie Ricket, Tiki Chamorro and Vivian Rivera.

On the August 3, 2024, episode 17 of WOW Season 10, The Classmaster won a 12-woman battle royal for the vacant WOW World Champion, in Los Angeles, CA, which aired on tape delay on January 11, 2025.

List of the 12-woman participants: Chantilly Chella, The Classmaster, Genesis, Holidead, Holly Swag, Paola the Colombian GOAT, Penelope Pink, Princess Aussie, Reina Del Rey, Santana Garrett, Tormenta, and Xena Phoenix.

== Reigns ==
As of November 8, 2026, there have been sixteen reigns among twelve champions and four vacancies. Terri Gold was the inaugural champion. Jungle Grrrl's reign is the longest at 1,300 days, while Penelope Pinkhas the shortest reign at 8 days. Gold, The Beast, Santana Garrett, and Pink have the most reigns at two times.

Key
No.	Overall reign number
Reign	Reign number for the specific champion
Days	Number of days held
+	Current reign is changing daily

No.	Champion	Championship change			Reign statistics		Notes	Ref.
No.	Champion	Date	Event	Location	Reign	Days	Notes	Ref.
Women of Wrestling (WOW)
1	Terri Gold	September 1, 2000	WOW Season 1: Episode 1	Inglewood, CA	1	105	Won a 20-woman battle royal to become the inaugural champion.	
2	Danger	December 15, 2000	WOW Season 1: Episode 16	Inglewood, CA	1	49	Danger replaced her partner Riot during this match. This episode aired on tape delay on January 19, 2001.	
3	Terri Gold	February 2, 2001	WOW Unleashed	Inglewood, CA	2	29		
—	Vacated	March 3, 2001	—	—	—	—	WOW ceased television production after March 3, 2001.	
4	Lana Star	January 19, 2013	Live event	Los Angeles, CA	1	49	Lana Star was declared as champion following WOW's television return. WOW (kayfabe) claimed that Lana Star had defeated Terri Gold on an independent wrestling event to win the vacant championship.	
5	Jungle Grrrl	March 9, 2013	WOW Season 3: Episode 14	Las Vegas, NV	1	1,300	Jungle Grrrl won the championship during the WOW! Pandemonium Tour 2013, matches from which later aired on tape delay on August 26, 2016.	
6	Santana Garrett	September 29, 2016	WOW Season 4: Episode 10	Los Angeles, CA	1	742	This was a triple threat match also involving The Beverly Hills Babe with Lana Star, with Santana Garrett pinning The Beverly Hills Babe to win the title.	
—	Vacated	October 11, 2018	—	—	—	—	After a triple threat match between Santana Garrett, Jungle Grrrl, and Tessa Blanchard ended a draw after both Garrett and Jungle Grrrl had pinned Blanchard, David McLane vacated the championship. This episode aired on tape delay on February 15, 2019.	
7	Tessa Blanchard	October 11, 2018	WOW Season 5: Episode 5	Los Angeles, CA	1	217	Defeated Jungle Grrrl for the vacant championship. This episode aired on tape delay on February 15, 2019.	
8	The Beast	May 16, 2019	WOW Season 6: Episode 12	Los Angeles, CA	1	1,275	This episode aired on tape delay on November 23, 2019.	
—	Vacated	November 11, 2022	WOW Season 8: Episode 18	Los Angeles, CA	—	—	The Beast relinquished the championship. This episode aired on tape delay on January 14, 2023.	
9	Penelope Pink	December 4, 2022	WOW Season 8: Episode 25	Los Angeles, CA	1	242	Won a 10-woman gauntlet match to win the vacant championship. This episode aired on tape delay on March 4, 2023.	
10	Princess Aussie	August 3, 2023	WOW Season 9: Episode 3	Los Angeles, CA	1	16	This was a triple threat match also involving Tormenta. This episode aired on tape delay on September 30, 2023.	
11	Abilene Maverick	August 19, 2023	WOW Season 9: Episode 13	Los Angeles, CA	1	116	This was a Fatal 5-way Championship Challenge match also involving The Beast, Penelope Pink and Tormenta. This episode aired on tape delay on December 9, 2023.	
12	The Beast	December 13, 2023	WOW Season 9: Episode 38	Los Angeles, CA	2	234	This episode aired on tape delay on June 1, 2024.	
—	Vacated	August 3, 2024	WOW Season 10: Episode 11	Los Angeles, CA	—	—	The Beast relinquished the championship. This episode aired on tape delay on November 23, 2024.	
13	The Classmaster	August 3, 2024	WOW Season 10: Episode 18	Los Angeles, CA	1	13	Won a 12-woman battle royal to win the vacant championship. This episode aired on tape delay on January 11, 2025.	
14	Tormenta	August 16, 2024	WOW Season 10: Episode 45	Los Angeles, CA	1	424	This episode aired on tape delay on July 19, 2025.	
15	Penelope Pink	October 14, 2025	WOW Season 11: Episode 20	Las Vegas, NV	2	8	This episode aired on tape delay on February 21, 2026.	
16	Santana Garrett	October 22, 2025	WOW Season 11: Episode 36	Las Vegas, NV	2	382+	This episode aired on tape delay on August 22, 2026.	

== Combined reigns ==
As of November 8, 2026.

†	Indicates the current champion

Rank	Wrestler	No. of reigns	Combined days
1	The Beast	2	1,509
2	Jungle Grrrl	1	1,300
3	Santana Garrett †	2	1,124
4	Tormenta	1	424
5	Penelope Pink	2	250
6	Tessa Blanchard	1	217
7	Terri Gold	2	134
8	Abilene Maverick	1	116
9	Danger	1	49
9	Lana Star	1	49
11	Princess Aussie	1	16
12	The Classmaster	1	13

== See also ==
- World Women's Championship (disambiguation)
