= Santana Garrett =

American professional wrestler and model

Personal information
- Born: May 22, 1988 (age 38) Ocala, Florida, U.S.
- Spouse: Jeremy Avner (m. 2019)
- Family: Kenny Garrett (father)

Professional wrestling career
- Ring name(s): Brittany; Santana; Santana G Santana Garrett; Santana Wonder
- Billed height: 5 ft 5 in (1.65 m)
- Billed weight: 140 lb (64 kg)
- Billed from: Ocala, Florida; Orlando, Florida
- Trained by: Kenny Garrett; Larry Zbyszko; Scott Hall
- Debut: 2009

Santana Garrett (born May 22, 1988) is an American professional wrestler, valet and model. She is currently signed to Women of Wrestling (WOW). During her career, Garrett has wrestled in many independent promotions across the world. She is best known for her time in Impact Wrestling under the ring name Brittany, and is also known for her time in WWE, where she performed on NXT under her real name, and was a coach at the WWE Performance Center. She has won many titles, such as the Shine Championship, the Shine Tag Team Championship and the Wonder of Stardom Championship.

== Professional wrestling career ==
=== Coastal Championship Wrestling (2009–2014) ===
Garrett began her career in Bruno Sassi's South Florida-based Coastal Championship Wrestling on November 27, 2009, event, where she defeated Kimberly to win the CCW Ladies Championship in her debut match. Garrett faced Betsy Ruth, Isis The Amazon and Jessika Haze in a Fatal Four-way match on December 12, where she successfully retained the Ladies Championship. Garrett faced Haze for the Ladies title on February 13 and May 15, where she emerged victorious both times. On April 3, Garrett teamed up with Nooie Lee to defeat Lucky O'Shea and Maxwell Chicago. On May 8, Garrett and Nooie Lee defeated Becky Bayless and Mister Saint Laurent. On June 12, Garrett teamed up with Sean Waltman to defeat Bayless and Saint Laurent.

On June 19, Santana Garrett defeated Rosie Lottalove to successfully defend the title via disqualification. On July 24, Garrett and Nooie Lee defeated Cherry Layne and Mike Reed. On August 21, Garrett teamed up with Leva Bates in a winning effort defeating the team of Haze and Lottalove. Garrett faced Haze on August 28, where she emerged victorious. On October 2, Garrett teamed up with JD Amazing in a winning effort defeating Jason Hanley and Shooter Storm in a mixed tag-team match. Garrett faced off against Calypso in a non-title match on October 16, where she emerged victorious. On October 30, Garrett and Amazing lost to Luke James and Rich James in a rematch. On December 4, Garrett dropped the Ladies title to Haze in a triple-threat match also involving Calypso. On March 26, in CCW, Garrett teamed up with Pablo Marquez in a winning effort defeating Haze and Harry Venis after Santana pinned Haze, thus earning a title opportunity. On April 3, Garrett faced Jessicka Havok for the title in CCW, but was unsuccessfully in capturing the title. Garrett went on to defeat Black Tigress, Danny Demanto and Christina Von Eerie to earn another shot at the title. On May 21, Garrett defeated Havok to win the Ladies Championship for the second time. Garrett defeated Von Eerie on June 11 and January 7, Aiden Altair on July 16, Jaime D on August 13, Jelena on August 20 and Wayne Van Dyke on November 19. On May 27, Garrett dropped the Ladies title to Havok.

On February 11, Garrett challenged Bates for the Ladies Championship, but was unsuccessful in gaining the title. On March 3, Garrett faced Von Eerie in a singles match, where Garrett emerged victorious. On May 5, Garrett defeated Rain in a singles match.

=== Independent circuit (2010–2019) ===
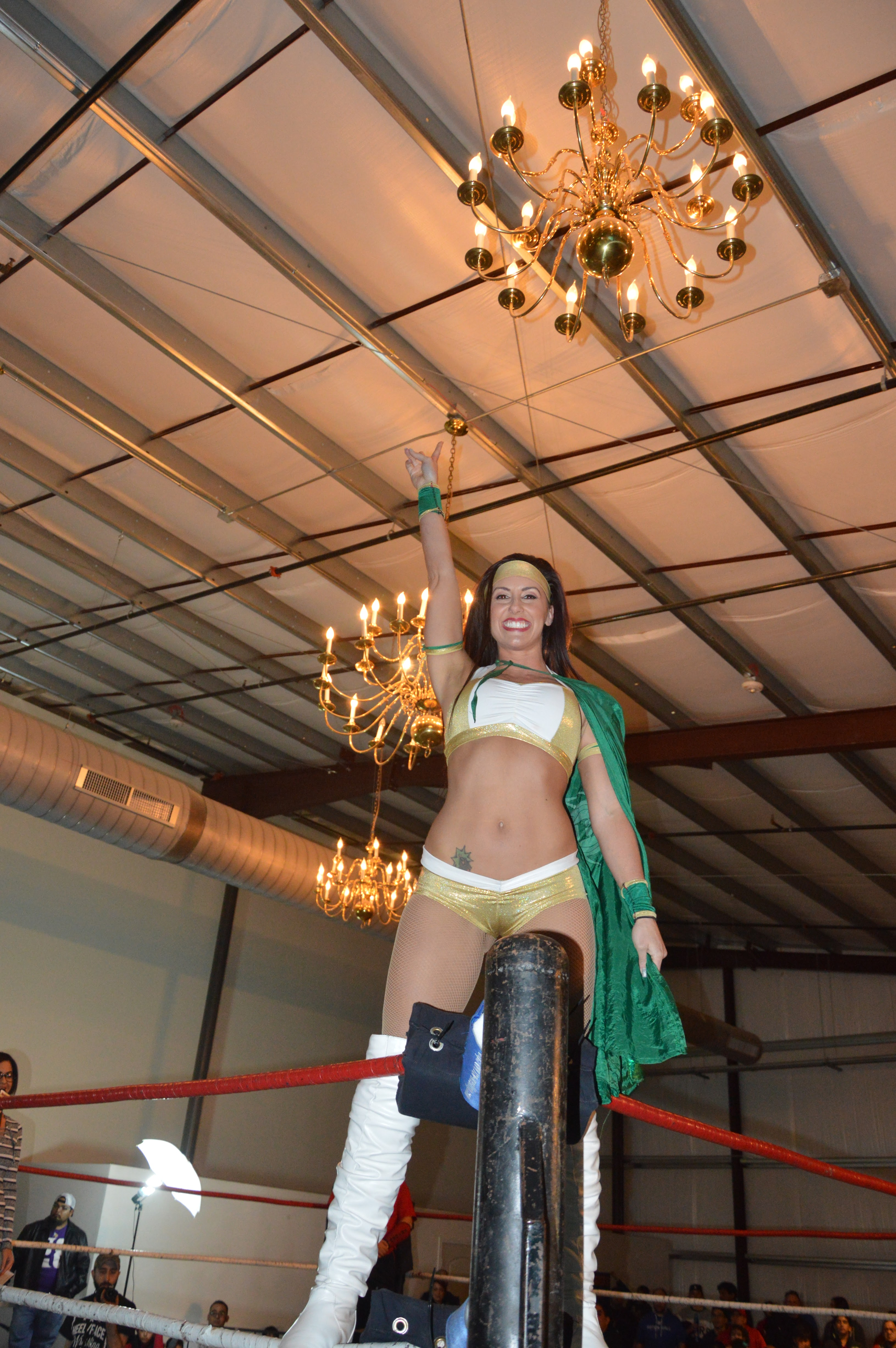
Garrett in 2017

Santana Garrett, as Santana G, appeared in IWA Mid-South on March 26, where she faced Jessika Haze in a winning effort. Garrett debuted in World League Wrestling on April 23, where she teamed up with Eathon Wright and Ryan Drago in a Mixed tag-team match to face Amy Hennig, Mark Sterling and Superstar Steve, where they emerged victorious when Garrett pinned Hennig. The following day, Garrett challenged Hennig for the WWL Ladies championship and won by disqualification, allowing Hennig to retain. Garrett lost a subsequent rematch by pinfall three months later on July 17.

Santana made her debut for Pro Wrestling Xtreme on June 18, 2011, at the PWX Wrestlewar, where she was defeated by former WWE Diva Jillian Hall in her return match. On January 28, Garrett faced Christina Von Eerie at her next appearance at Pro Wrestling Xtreme, where she failed to win.

Garrett made her debut for Orlando Pro Wrestling on July 30, where she defeated Chasyn Rance. On August 27, Garrett faced Wayne Van Dyke in and singles match, where Garrett emerged victorious. On September 2, Garrett defeated Rance in a rematch. On October 14, Garrett teamed up with Rance to defeat Cherry Layne and Mike Reed in a mixed tag-team match.

Garrett made her debut for Southern Championship Wrestling Florida on June 4, where she defeated The DTW Ninja. Garrett faced Leva Bates for the SCW Women's Championship on July 21, where she successfully defeated Bates to win the SCW Women's title. At a Southern Championship Wrestling Florida event, Garrett defeated Chasyn Rance to become the first Female to win the Florida Cruiserweight Championship.

Garrett made her debut for Shimmer Women Athletes, on September 27, 2012, at Volume 50, where she competed against Mercedes Martinez in a losing effort. At Volume 51, Garrett was defeated by Melanie Cruise in a singles match. On April 14 at Volume 54, Garrett faced Miss Natural on April 14 the Shimmer 54 volume, where she emerged victorious. At the following volume, Garrett teamed up with Heidi Lovelace in a losing effort to the team of Jessicka Havok and Sassy Stephie. Garrett faced Rhia O'Reilly on the 57 volume of Shimmer, where she emerged victorious via pinfall when Garrett pinned Reilly after a Shining Star Press.

In 2013, Garrett received a tryout in Ohio Valley Wrestling on the September 18 edition of OVW Episode 735, where she faced the three time OVW Women's Champion "The Queen of OVW" Taeler Hendrix, which she failed to win.

Garrett made her debut for Absolute Intense Wrestling at the Girls Night Out 9 event on October 6, losing to both Jenny Rose, and the following night on the Girls Night Out 10 event she lost to Kimber Lee.

Garrett signed with David McLane's Women of Wrestling promotion in 2013. She debuted at WOW! Pandemonium Tour 2013. She came together with Amber O'Neal to form a tag team, winning the WOW Tag Team Championship.

On February 7, 2015, Garrett defeated Barbi Hayden to win the NWA World Women's Championship. On March 28, 2015, Garrett defeated La Rosa Negra to win the Ring Warriors Battling Bombshells Championship. Garrett debuted for Queens of Combat on June 13, 2015, and defeated Mandy Leon in the first round of the Queens of Combat Title Tournament. She defeated Su Yung in the second round on the following day. On December 18, 2015, Garrett lost the NWA World Women's Championship to Amber Gallows.

In June 2015, it was announced that Garrett would appear in Global Force Wrestling. She debuted for the promotion on their July 9 show in Appleton, Wisconsin in a winning effort against Melanie Cruise.

=== Total Nonstop Action Wrestling (2010) ===
Santana made her debut for Total Nonstop Action Wrestling (TNA) on the March 29, 2010, edition of Impact!, along with the re-debuting Orlando Jordan where she debuted a new look and started a bisexual angle. On the May 3 edition of Impact!, Garrett along with Jordan debuted their new interview segment, O-Zone, during which Orlando attacked and started a feud with the Global Champion Rob Terry.

=== Shine Wrestling (2012–2019, 2021) ===
Santana made her debut for new women's wrestling promotion Shine Wrestling on July 20, 2012, in Ybor City, Florida, where she faced off against Tina San Antonio, in a winning effort. On the August 17 Shine 2 event, Garrett was defeated by Rain. Garrett faced against Sienna Duvall in singles competition at the Shine 3 event on September 21, where Garrett emerged victorious. Garrett faced Mercedes Martinez on the October 19 Shine 4 event, in a losing effort. Over the next couple of Shine events, Garrett defeated OVW wrestlers Jessie Belle, Nikki St. John, Sojourner Bolt and fellow Shine wrestler Leah Von Dutch in singles matches. Garrett competed in the Shine Championship tournament, defeating Kimberly in the Tournament Qualifier. Garrett faced Brandi Wine on the August 25 at the Shine 12 event, which ended in a draw after an interference by Malia Hosaka. Following the match, Garrett teamed up with Amber O'Neal in a winning effort defeating Brandi Wine and Malia Hosaka when Santana pinned Wine. On September 28, at the SHINE 13, Garrett and O'Neal faced The S-N-S Express (Jessie Belle Smothers and Sassy Stephie), but lost when Stephie pinned O'Neal after a Kiss My Sass. On December 13 at Shine 15, Santana and Amber O'Neal lost to the S-N-S Express and due to the pre-match stipulation were forced to disband.

After another stint in TNA, Garrett returned to Shine Wrestling at the Shine 23 event on December 5, 2014; confronting her villainous former tag team partner Amber O'Neal. Garrett defeated O'Neal in a singles match later in the evening. She unsuccessfully challenged Mia Yim for the Shine Championship at the Shine 24 event. On April 3, 2015, Garrett defeated Yim at Shine 26 in a title vs. title match to win the Shine Championship. She lost the title to Taylor Made on December 11.

Garrett returned for SHINE 69 on October 24, 2021, and defeated Kaci Lennox in a Teacher vs Student match.

=== Return to Total Nonstop Action Wrestling (2013–2014) ===
Garrett returned to TNA at the Knockouts Knockdown on March 17, 2013, where she competed as a villainess in a losing effort against Brooke Tessmacher. On January 27, 2014, it was announced by the promoter of Shine Wrestling, Sal Hamaoui, that Garrett has signed a contract with TNA, which was later confirmed by PWInsider on February 14. In mid-March, during an interview with Impact Wrestling, it was revealed that Garrett will use the ring name Brittany.

Brittany made her in-ring debut as a face on the March 13 episode of Impact Wrestling, defeating Gail Kim after a miscommunication between Kim and her enforcer Lei'D Tapa. Brittany, under the gimmick of TNA Knockouts Champion Madison Rayne's biggest fan. The angle had the two competing together in a tag team match against The Beautiful People (Angelina Love and Velvet Sky). On the April 10 episode of Impact Wrestling, Brittany competed in a fatal four-way match to determine the next number one contender to Rayne's TNA Women's Knockout Championship, which would be won by Angelina Love. Brittany and Rayne once again competed against The Beautiful People, only this time in a tag team elimination evening gown match on the May 8 episode of Impact Wrestling, which The Beautiful People won. On the May 22 episode of Impact Wrestling, Brittany received her first shot at the TNA Women's Knockout Championship against Angelina Love, but was unsuccessful in capturing the title. After the match, The Beautiful People would attack Brittany with Gail Kim making the save.

This led to a tag team match, where The Beautiful People defeated Kim and Brittany on the May 29 episode of Impact Wrestling. After the match, the storyline between Brittany and Madison developed into a lesbian angle with Brittany enamoring of Rayne which made her feel uncomfortable. Brittany made an appearance during Rayne's rematch for the TNA Women's Knockout Championship against Love on the June 5 episode of Impact Wrestling, which Rayne would lose after a distraction provided by Sky, and Brittany just standing there. On the July 3 episode of Impact Wrestling, Brittany turned heel after attacking Rayne and vowing to destroy her. On the following episode of Impact Wrestling, the evil Brittany once again challenged for the Knockouts Championship in a four-way match, losing to defending champion Gail Kim. The feud between Brittany and Rayne culminated in a no count-out, no disqualification match on the July 17 episode of Impact Wrestling, which was won by Rayne, further continuing her losing streak since her debut match.

After her rivalry with Rayne ended, Brittany was moved to a storyline with Samuel Shaw in mid–September, where she began showing signs of affection towards Shaw, similar to which Shaw had previously shown to Christy Hemme. This eventually resulted in Shaw turning heel against Gunner and aligning himself with Brittany. On December 5, Garrett announced she was no longer under contract with TNA.

=== World Wonder Ring Stardom (2015–2017) ===
On October 16, 2015, Garrett made her debut for Japanese promotion World Wonder Ring Stardom, during their first American tour in Covina, California. She teamed with Melina in a tag team match, where they defeated Hudson Envy and Thunder Rosa. On October 25, Garrett made her Japanese debut for Stardom, when she and Hiroyo Matsumoto defeated Goddess of Stardom Champions Io Shirai and Mayu Iwatani in a non-title match. Also on October 25, at Mask Fiesta 2015, Santana Garrett, under the ring name Santana Wonder, teamed up with Lucky Blanca to defeat Crazy Wolf and Datura. On November 8, Garrett and Matsumoto took part in the 2015 Goddesses of Stardom Tag League, where they made it to the finals, before losing to Shirai and Iwatani in a match, which was also contested for the Goddess of Stardom Championship. On November 15, Garrett successfully defended the NWA World Women's Championship against Holidead, which marked the first time in 36 years that the title had been defended in Japan. On November 23, Garrett defeated Io Shirai in a double title match to retain the NWA World Women's Championship and win the Wonder of Stardom Championship. After nine successful defenses, Garrett lost the title to Kairi Hojo on May 15, 2016. On May 21, Garrett took part in a tournament to crown the inaugural SWA World Champion, where she was defeated by Toni Storm in the semifinals.

=== WOW – Women of Wrestling (2013–2019, 2022–present) ===
Garret found a quick success on Women of Wrestling (WOW), as she and Amber O'Neal, under the name The All American Girls captured the WOW Tag Team Championship from Caged Heat (Delta Lotta Pain and Loca). However, on the third season of WOW, Caged Heat's attorney Sophia Lopez was able to convince WWA (Women Wrestling Association) that they should vacate The All American Girls' championship, and so they did. As The All American Girls faced Caged heat in the first round of the vacated WOW Tag Team Championship, O'Neal turned on Garrett, causing them to lose their match. Garrett was later attacked by Razor and Spike, and was medically escorted. Garrett made her return on the season finale, defeating her former partner O'Neal and the WOW World Champion Jungle Grrrl to win the championship for the first time.

As WOW premiered on AXS TV which aired on early 2019, Garrett got into a heated feud with Tessa Blanchard. In their climax of their rivalry, Garrett wrestled Blanchard and Jungle Grrrl to a no contest, therefore, Garrett was stripped of the championship.

=== Impact Wrestling (2017) ===
On March 2, 2017, Santana made appearances for Impact Wrestling during their tapings of Impact!, by first competing against Rosemary (aired on tape delay on April 13) in a losing effort, then once again at Knockouts Knockdown defeating Brandi Rhodes.

=== WWE ===
==== Enhancement talent (2013, 2016–2018) ====
In September 2013, Garrett received a tryout in WWE's developmental territory NXT on the September 13, 2013, tapings which aired on tape delay on October 9, where she faced Charlotte accompanied by Bayley in a losing effort. In 2016, though not signed to WWE, Garrett made three appearances on NXT, losing to Asuka, Emma and Billie Kay. On July 13, 2017, Garrett returned as part of the Mae Young Classic, being eliminated from the tournament in the first round by Piper Niven. She made an appearance on the October 26, 2017, episode of NXT, participating in a battle royal which was won by Nikki Cross to determine one of the contenders for the vacant NXT Women's Championship at NXT TakeOver: WarGames. On the July 4, 2018, episode of NXT, Garrett was defeated by Dakota Kai.

==== NXT (2019–2021) ====
In mid-August 2019, it was announced that Garrett had been officially signed to a contract and would report to the Performance Center before she appeared in the developmental company NXT. On November 6, 2019, episode of NXT, Santana made her in-ring debut in a losing effort against Taynara Conti. On the December 18, 2019, episode of NXT Santana was defeated by Io Shiraii. On January 15, 2020, Santana was an entrant in a number one contender's battle royal to face Rhea Ripley for the NXT Women's Championship at NXT TakeOver: Portland, but was eliminated by Shayna Baszler. On the February 12, 2020, episode of NXT Santana was defeated by Bianca Belair in less than one minute. On the April 17, 2020, episode of Main Event, Garrett debuted on the main roster, losing to Liv Morgan. On the April 20 episode of Raw, Santana made her Raw debut, but was quickly defeated by Bianca Belair. Garrett had a losing streak in NXT, losing to the likes of Belair, Io Shirai and Mia Yim in convincing fashion, while also failing to win on the main roster. Garrett ended her losing streak on June 3, 2020, episode of NXT with a win over Aliyah. This would be Garrett's only televised victory during her time with WWE. On the July 1, 2020, episode of NXT, Santana was effortlessly destroyed and defeated by the returning Mercedes Martinez who no-sold her offense. Garrett entered the 2021 Women's Royal Rumble at number 12. She lasted four minutes and thirty-one seconds before being eliminated by Rhea Ripley. On June 2, 2021, Garrett was released by WWE, ending her near-two-year tenure with the company.

=== All Elite Wrestling (2021) ===
Santana Garrett made her AEW debut as jobber in a losing effort against Diamante on AEW Dark. Garrett faced Tay Conti in a losing effort on the Buy-In special for AEW Rampage. This was a rematch from their days in NXT where Conti previously defeated Garrett. Garrett returned to AEW Dark and suffered another loss, this time being squashed by The Bunny. On the November 12, 2021, episode of AEW Rampage, she was defeated by Jade Cargill in under two minutes.

=== Return to the independent circuit (2023–present) ===
She came back to Women of Wrestling in December 2023 to team with Americana as the "All American Girls" feuding with Amber O'Neal & Jessie Jones. In January 2023, Garrett wrestled against Jessie Elaban in Boca Raton Championship Wrestling and debuted with her first victory in BRCW.

== Personal life ==
Garrett has two sisters and five brothers. She is a second-generation professional wrestler, with her father Kenny Garrett having performed as "TNT" Kenny G. Garrett has stated: "My dad taught me a lot about the business growing up. He used to wrestle in St. Louis and other territories, and I knew I wanted to become a wrestler as well." Garrett's father died after a long battle against cancer on December 9, 2018. She previously lived in Saint Louis, Missouri, but returned to Ocala, Florida in 2010. Shortly thereafter, she moved to Orlando, Florida. Her favorite wrestlers are Sable, Victoria, and Trish Stratus.

Garrett is married to Jeremy Avner, a nutrition coach based in Lake Mary, Florida.

== Championships and accomplishments ==
- American Pro Wrestling Alliance
  - APWA World Ladies Championship (1 time)
- Belleview Pro Wrestling
  - BPW Heavyweight Championship (1 time)
  - BPW Tag Team Championship (1 time) – with Chasyn Rance
- Cauliflower Alley Club
  - Women's Wrestling Award (2018)
  - Future Legend Award (2014)
- Championship Wrestling Entertainment
  - CWE Vixen's Championship (1 time)
- Coastal Championship Wrestling
  - CCW Ladies Championship (2 times)
- Conquer Pro Wrestling
  - CPW Leading Ladies Championship (1 time)
- Jersey Championship Wrestling
  - JCW Women's Championship (1 time)
- Masters of Ring Entertainment
  - Lasting Legacy Tournament (2015)
- National Wrestling Alliance
  - NWA World Women's Championship (1 time)
- Nova Pro Wrestling
  - NPW Women's Championship (1 time)
- Orlando Pro Wrestling
  - OPW Women's Championship (1 time)
- Pro Wrestling 2.0
  - PW2.0 Women's Championship (2 times)
  - PW2.0 Tag Team Championship (1 time) – with Chelsea Green
- Pro Wrestling Illustrated
  - PWI ranked her No. 4' of the best 50 female singles wrestlers in the PWI Female 50 in 2015
- Revolution Championship Wrestling
  - RCW Women's Championship (1 time)
- Ring Warriors
  - Ring Warriors Battling Bombshells Championship (1 time)
- RIOT Pro Wrestling
  - RIOT Cruiserweight Championship (1 time)
  - RIOT Women's Championship (1 time)
- Shine Wrestling
  - Shine Championship (1 time)
  - Shine Tag Team Championship (1 time) – with Raquel
- Southern Championship Wrestling
  - SCW Florida Cruiserweight Championship (1 time)
  - SCW Women's Championship (1 time)
- USA Pro Wrestling
  - USPW Women's Championship (1 time)
- USA Wrestling Alliance
  - USWA Women's Championship (1 time)
- Wrestling Superstar
  - Wrestling Superstar Women's Championship (1 time)
- Women of Wrestling
  - WOW World Championship (2 time, current)
  - WOW World Tag Team Championship (1 time) – with Amber O'Neal
- World Wonder Ring Stardom
  - Wonder of Stardom Championship (1 time)
  - International Grand Prix (2016)
