= Tessa Blanchard =

American professional wrestler

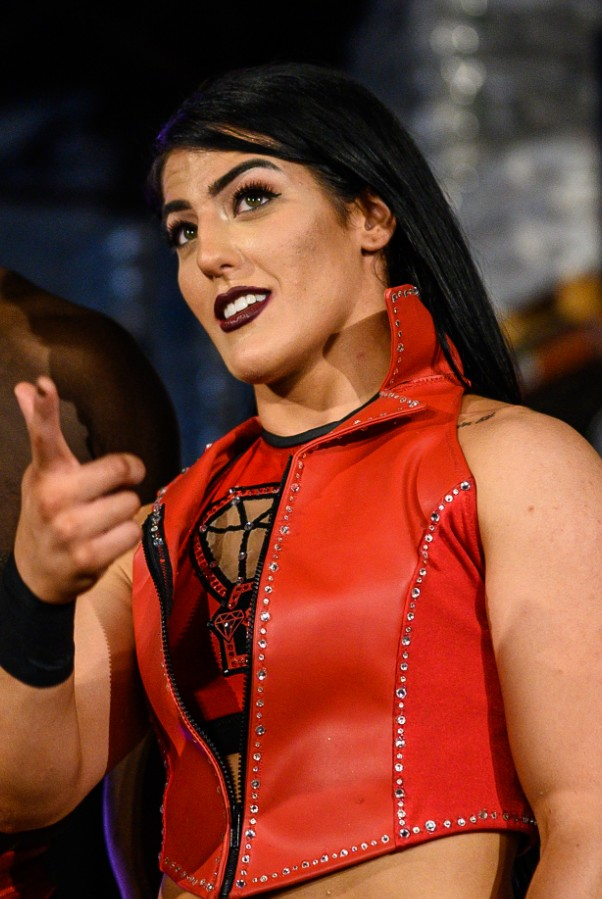
- Blanchard in 2019

Personal information
- Born: July 26, 1995 (age 31) Charlotte, North Carolina, U.S.
- Spouses: Miguel Olivo (m. 2020; div. 2023) Esfinge (engaged)
- Parent(s): Tully Blanchard (father); Courtney Shattuck (mother)
- Family: Joe Blanchard (grandfather); Magnum T. A. (stepfather)

Professional wrestling career
- Ring name: Tessa Blanchard
- Billed height: 5 ft 5 in (165 cm)
- Billed weight: 125 lb (57 kg)
- Billed from: Charlotte, North Carolina
- Trained by: George South
- Debut: June 13, 2014

Tessa Blanchard (born July 26, 1995) is an American professional wrestler. She is signed to Mexican promotion Consejo Mundial de Lucha Libre (CMLL), where she is a former a one-time CMLL World Women's Tag Team Champion (with Lluvia). She also makes appearances for partner promotion Major League Wrestling (MLW) and on the independent circuit. She is best known for her tenures with Total Nonstop Action Wrestling (TNA), where she is a former TNA World Champion (and the first woman to win said championship) and a former TNA Knockouts Champion.

A third-generation professional wrestler, Blanchard is the daughter of Tully Blanchard, granddaughter of wrestling promoter Joe Blanchard, and the stepdaughter of Tully Blanchard's rival Magnum T. A.

== Early life and training ==
Blanchard was born in Charlotte, North Carolina, on July 26, 1995. She is the granddaughter of wrestler Joe Blanchard, daughter of Tully Blanchard and the stepdaughter of Magnum T. A.

At age four, Blanchard and her siblings moved in with her mother and stepfather after her parents' separation. Tully Blanchard would visit his children at least once a month after the divorce. She has three siblings from her father and twin half-siblings from her stepfather. Blanchard considers herself a musical-theater enthusiast, having enrolled at the Children's Theatre of Charlotte, joining Shakespeare recitation contests, and acting in all of her high school's amateur productions. She was also on the track team.

She left home after high school and briefly attended the University of North Carolina at Charlotte, lived off income from working in a nightclub, and stopped communicating with members of her immediate family for a prolonged stretch. Blanchard was bartending and waiting tables and partying with her college friends when her interest in wrestling was piqued. She went with her father for the Four Horsemen's 2012 induction into WWE's Hall of Fame in Miami. Tessa kept her wrestling plans unknown from her family as she was then still only slowly reconciling with her mother and stepfather.

Blanchard went to Highspots Wrestling School in Charlotte when she turned 18 in 2013. She was trained by veteran NWA/WWE/WCW enhancement talent George South and had future WWE wrestler Cedric Alexander among her classmates. Blanchard informed her father and stepfather about her wrestling training upon the insistence of South and Highspots owner Michael Bochicchio around six months into her training. She tried out for WWE in 2014 but a formal offer never materialized.

== Professional wrestling career ==
=== Independent circuit (2014–2016; 2018–present) ===
Early career

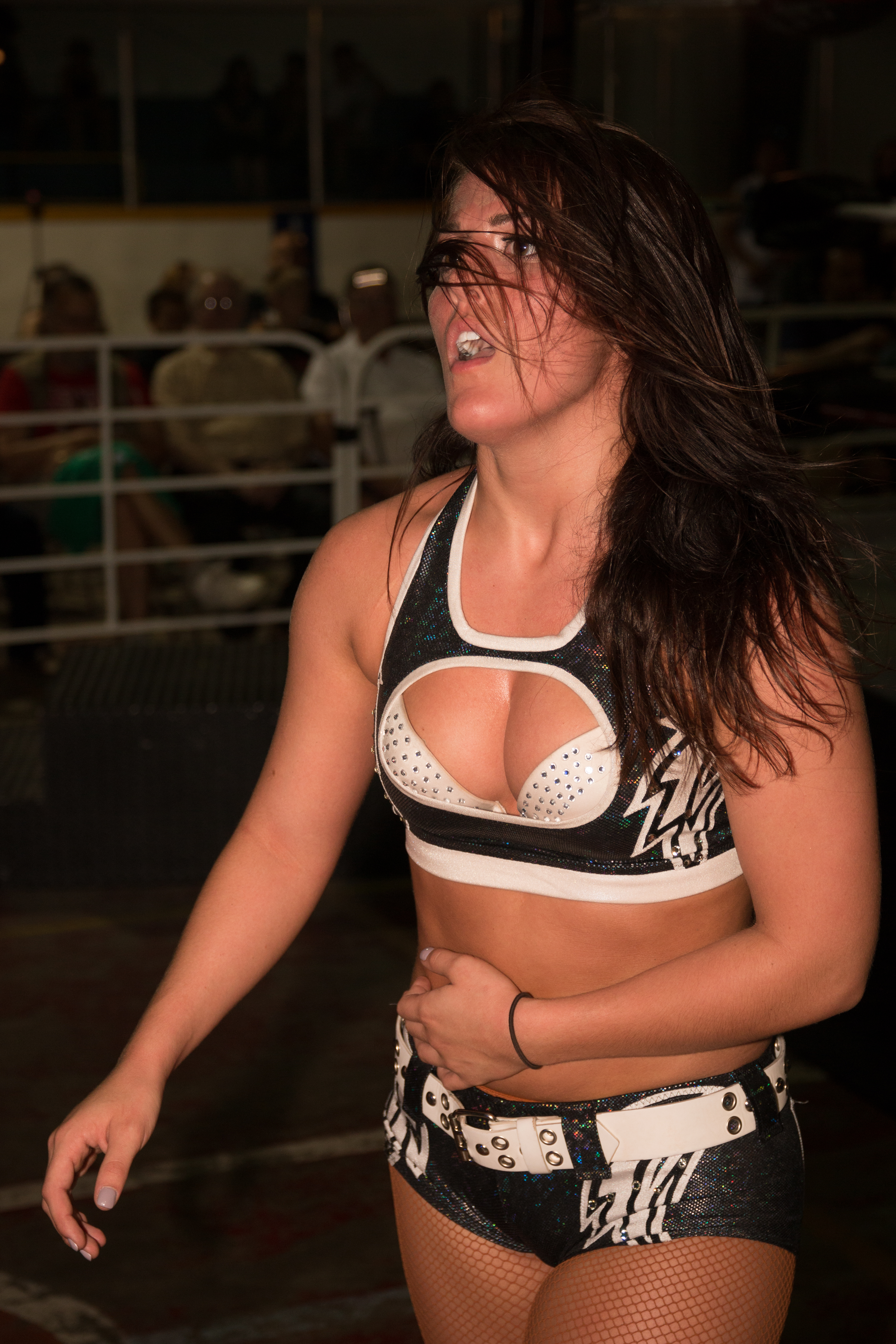
Blanchard post-match in 2013

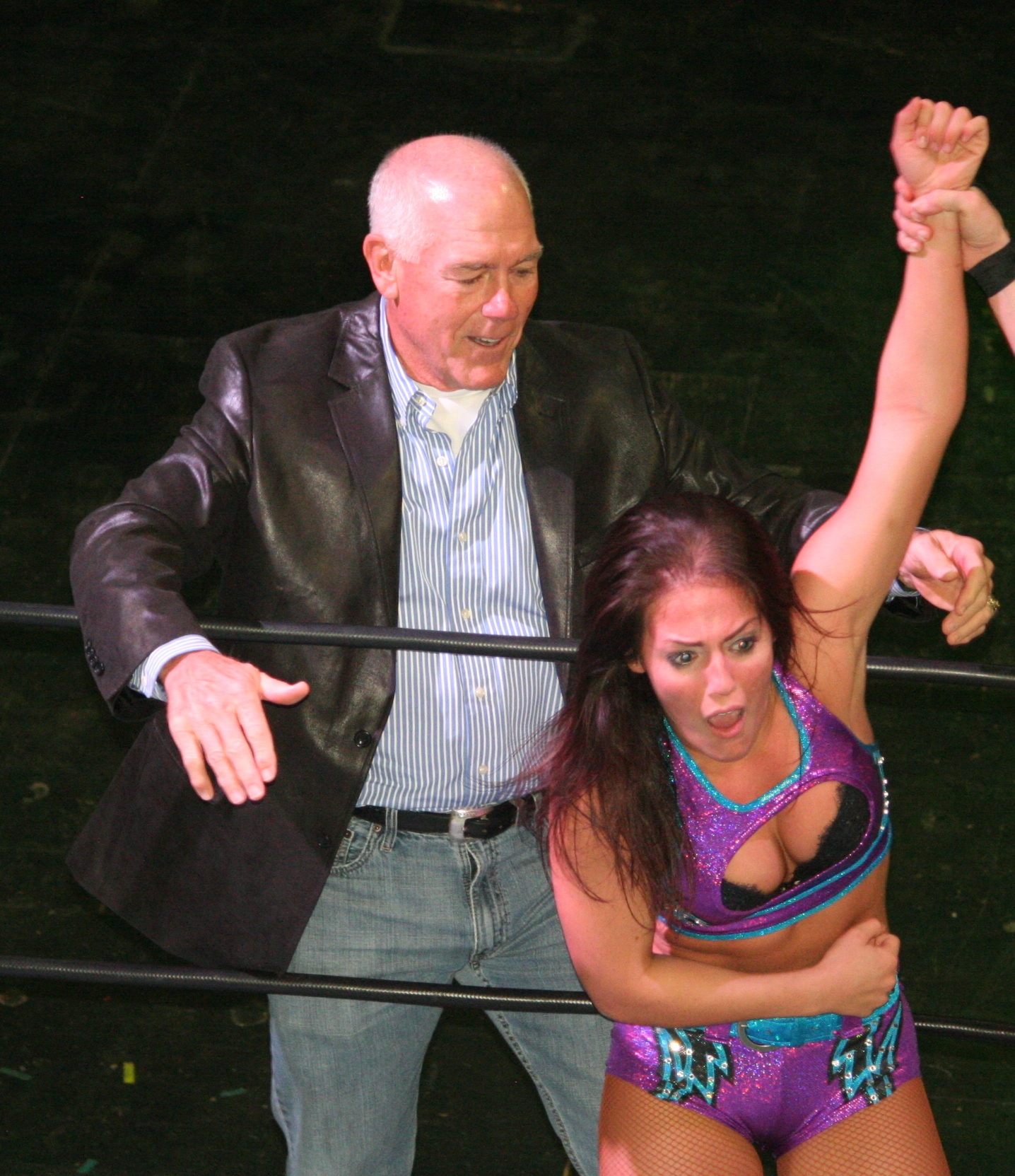
Blanchard with her father Tully in 2014

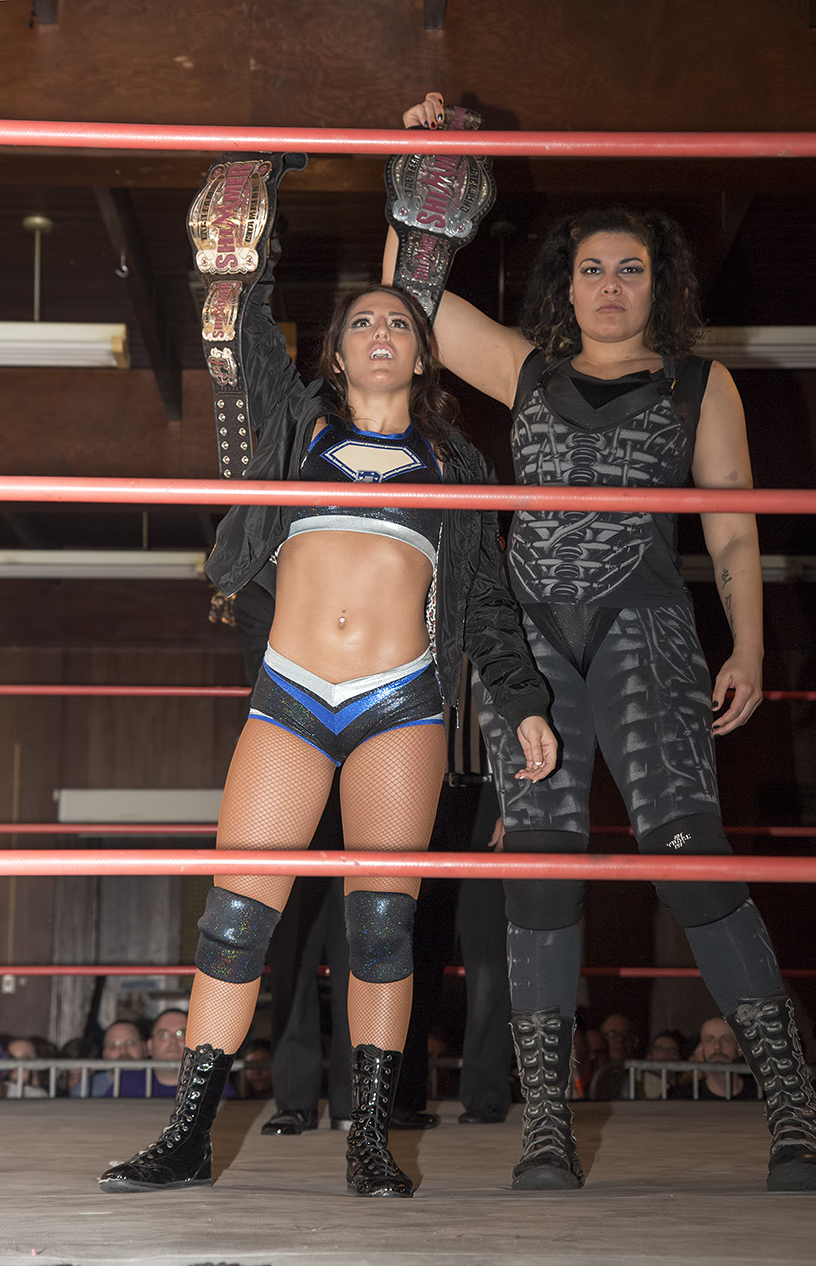
In SHIMMER Blanchard aligned herself with Vanessa Kraven in a tag-team known as "Mount Tessa". Together the duo won the Shimmer Tag Team Championship in 2016 and reigned for almost exactly a full year.

Blanchard competed at Queens of Combat 2 on June 13, 2014, where she interrupted a speech by Miss Rachel after her victory over Amanda Rodriguez, which resulted in a match between Blanchard and Miss Rachel, where Blanchard was defeated. On October 11, she participated in the Super 8 ChickFight tournament organized by the East Coast Wrestling Association (ECWA), a federation of Delaware, where women under ECWA compete. Blanchard won the tournament by eliminating successively Tina San Antonio, Renee Michelle, and finally, Jenny Rose. A week later, Blanchard successfully defended her title of women's champion of the ECWA against Amber O'Neal.

On November 8, 2014, Blanchard debuted for Women Superstars Uncensored and was defeated by Niya in a match for the WSU Spirit Championship at Breaking Barriers III. On February 21, 2015, Blanchard picked up her first victory in WSU when she defeated Sassy Stephie.

Blanchard debuted for Shine Wrestling as a villain at the Shine 26 event on April 3, 2015, and was defeated by Evie. Later in the evening, Blanchard attacked Leva Bates, causing her and Jessicka Havok to be defeated by Saraya Knight and Su Yung, and later became the newest member of Valkyrie. At Shine 27, Blanchard was defeated by Bates. After the match, she and April Hunter both attacked Bates.

On January 9, 2016, Blanchard made her Lucha Underground debut losing to Ivelisse Velez in a dark match. On April 24, 2016, Blanchard wrestled in a tag team dark match alongside Prince Puma at a Lucha Underground taping defeating Marty Martinez and Mariposa.

Blanchard began wrestling intergender matches following the spring of 2016, after working for SHIMMER, Stardom, Lucha Underground, and NXT. She had a singles match against NXT signee Dominik Dijakovic and a mixed-tag team match with Ricochet, Bea Priestley, and Will Ospreay. On June 16, 2018, Blanchard defeated Mercedes Martinez to win the WSU Championship.

On July 7, Rise Wrestling had their Rise of the Knockouts cross-promotional event with Impact Wrestling. Blanchard won the Phoenix of Rise Championship, in a 30-minute Iron Woman match against Mercedes Martinez to win the previously vacated title. Blanchard lost the championship to Martinez on October 19, in a 75-minute iron woman match, the longest women's wrestling match in history. On July 14, Blanchard defeated Lacey Lane and Santana Garrett to win The Crash Women's Championship.

On September 1, Blanchard defeated Britt Baker, Chelsea Green, and Madison Rayne in a Four Corner Survival match at All In.

=== WWE (2016, 2017) ===
In 2016, Blanchard appeared in WWE, making her in-ring debut for NXT on April 2, 2016, in a match won by Alexa Bliss. On May 4, Blanchard wrestled and lost to Nia Jax. On June 15, Blanchard wrestled her third match, losing to Carmella. On July 13, 2017, Blanchard returned as part of the Mae Young Classic, and was eliminated from the tournament in the first round by Kairi Sane.

=== World Wonder Ring Stardom (2016–2017) ===
In August 2016, Blanchard made her Japanese debut for the World Wonder Ring Stardom promotion by entering the 2016 5-Star Grand Prix, where she made it to the finals, before losing to Yoko Bito on September 22. Blanchard returned to Stardom in April 2017. On April 30, she took part in the 2017 Cinderella Tournament, where she defeated High Speed Champion Kris Wolf in the first round, before being eliminated in the second round by eventual tournament winner Toni Storm. On May 14, Blanchard teamed with Jessicka Havok to unsuccessfully challenge Hiroyo Matsumoto and Jungle Kyona for the Goddesses of Stardom Championship.

=== Impact Wrestling (2018–2020) ===
==== Knockouts Champion (2018–2019) ====
Blanchard made her debut for Impact Wrestling on April 22, 2018, at Redemption, when she joined the commentary team during a match between Kiera Hogan and Taya Valkyrie. A few weeks later, after attacking her during her match, Blanchard defeated Hogan in her first match on Impact!. On Slammiversary XVI, Blanchard scored her first pay-per-view win, when she defeated Allie.

On August 12 (which aired on tape delay on August 30) at ReDefined special, Blanchard defeated Allie and Su Yung in a three-way match to win the Impact Knockouts Championship for the first time in her career. At One Night Only: Bad Intentions, which aired the following night, Blanchard made her first successful title defense, defeating Gisele Shaw. During her reign, Blanchard was able to retain her title against various competitors such as Su Yung, and Faby Apache. In October, Blanchard started a feud with Taya Valkyrie, whom she defeated on two different occasions — at Bound for Glory and three weeks later in a rematch at Impact. Valkyrie was then able to submit Blanchard in a mixed tag team match that earned her another title opportunity.

On January 6, 2019, at Homecoming, Blanchard lost the championship to Valkyrie, after special guest referee Gail Kim (whom she attacked during the match) performed Eat Defeat on Blanchard, ending her reign at 147 days. After she failed to regain the title from Valkyrie in a street fight, Blanchard started a feud with Kim that led to both women attacking each other on numerous occasions inside and outside the ring (including at Kim's husband's restaurant). This led to the announcement of a match between the two, at Rebellion on April 28, where Blanchard defeated Kim in what was officially Kim's last match. After the match, Kim praised Blanchard for her abilities and as the future of the division. Blanchard thanked Kim and returned her respect, turning her face in the process for the first time in her career.

==== Impact World Champion (2019–2020) ====
On July 7, Blanchard competed against Sami Callihan in the first intergender match to ever headline a professional wrestling pay-per-view event at Slammiversary XVII, during which she was defeated. Following the event, Blanchard and Callihan were randomly paired as tag team partners in the Mashup Tournament, which they won by defeating Dave Crist and Trey Miguel in the qualifier and three other teams in the four-way elimination final. As a result of winning the tournament, Blanchard and Callihan qualified for a Slammiversary rematch at Unbreakable to determine the #1 contender for the Impact World Championship. Blanchard lost to Callihan in the subsequent match. She later competed in a ladder match for the X Division Championship, which was won by Ace Austin, on October 20 at Bound for Glory.

On the November 19 episode of Impact!, Blanchard won a Gauntlet match against Daga, Moose, Rich Swann, Michael Elgin, and Brian Cage to become the #1 contender for the Impact World Championship. At the Hard to Kill pay-per-view on January 12, 2020, Blanchard defeated Callihan to win the Impact World Championship, becoming the first woman in history to win the title. Blanchard made only one successful title defence against Taya Valkyrie who was the second woman to challenge for the world title also the first time to feature two women competing for the company's main championship. Her last match in Impact was taped on March 7, 2020, and aired on April 7, 2020, she teamed with Eddie Edwards for the Impact World Tag Team Championship against champions The North (Ethan Page and Josh Alexander) in a losing effort. After going on a leave of absence due to the COVID-19 pandemic, Blanchard departed Impact Wrestling on June 25 after her contract was terminated before it was set to expire on June 30; she was stripped of the Impact World Championship in the process.

=== WOW – Women of Wrestling (2018–2022) ===
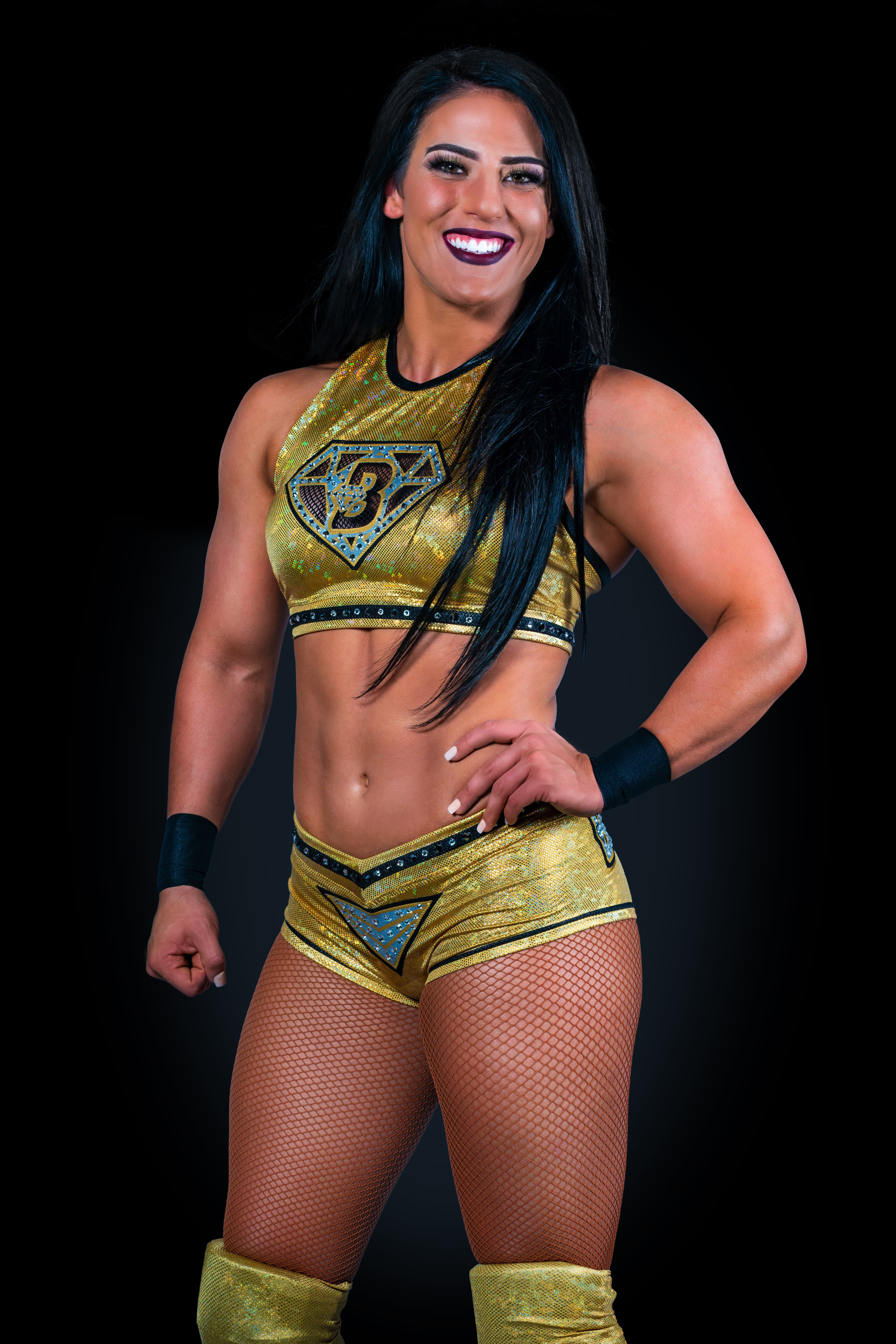
Promotional picture of Blanchard on WOW – Women of Wrestling

On September 5, 2018, it was announced that Blanchard had signed with Women of Wrestling (WOW), and would make her debut through the TV tapings from October 2018. On January 18, 2019, when WOW premiered on AXS TV, Blanchard made her televised debut, where she confronted the WOW World Champion Santana Garrett, establishing herself as the villain, as the two would feud over the championship. Blanchard won the championship for the first time on the February 15 episode of WOW by defeating previously undefeated Jungle Grrrl. On March 6, 2019, Blachard joined WOW owners Jeanie Buss and David McLane along with AXS TV CEO Andrew Simon to announce the network's second season renewal with a record number of 24 episodes. In addition, it was announced that Blanchard would be one of the trainers in the WOW all-women's wrestling training school in Long Beach, California. During her reign, Blanchard successfully defended her championship against Faith the Lioness, Reyna Reyes, Serpentine, and WOW's veteran, former champion, Jungle Grrrl. At the second-season finale, Blanchard lost her championship to The Beast, ending her reign at 217 days.

On October 6, 2021, on top of the Circa Resort & Casino in Las Vegas, ViacomCBS Global Distribution President Dan Cohen, alongside David McLane and WOW Executive Producers Jeanie Buss and AJ Mendez announced ViacomCBS had entered into a multi-year distribution agreement for WOW. For Blanchard this media rights deal between CBS and WOW meant the biggest distribution platform of her career and in the history of women's professional wrestling. However, Blanchard had a falling out with the company and left before the new season began.

=== Lucha Libre AAA Worldwide (2019) ===
On March 18, 2019, it was announced by Konnan that Blanchard had left The Crash Lucha Libre and joined AAA Lucha Libre. On May 18 in Tuxtla Gutiérrez, Chiapas, Blanchard made her debut in the AAA teaming with La Hiedra, who defeated Faby Apache and AAA Reina de Reinas Champion Lady Shani.

On August 3 at Triplemanía XXVII, Blanchard defeated Apache, Taya Valkyrie, Ayako Hamada, Chik Tormenta, La Hiedra, and Lady Shani in a Tables, Ladders, and Chairs match, to win the AAA Reina de Reinas Championship thus becoming the third foreigner (after Taya Valkyrie and Ayako Hamada) and first American to win the championship. However, Blanchard lost the title to Valkyrie in her first defense at the Impact Wrestling and AAA Lucha Invades NY event on September 15, ending her reign of 43 days.

=== Consejo Mundial de Lucha Libre (2023–2024) ===
On October 4, 2023, Consejo Mundial de Lucha Libre announced that Blanchard would be competing in the promotion for their Grand Prix tournament. She won the CMLL Women's Tag Team Championship with Lluvia, but Blanchard left CMLL on December 13, 2024, vacating the titles.

=== Return to TNA (2024–2026) ===
Blanchard signed a contract with TNA (formerly Impact Wrestling) and made her return at Final Resolution on December 13, 2024, by attacking Jordynne Grace following her match against Rosemary, establishing herself as a heel for the first time since 2019. Her return received negative response from the fans, usually calling her "racist" during her matches. During her time with TNA, she wrestled on several PPVs, like Genesis where she defeated Grace, Rebellion, where she was defeated by Masha Slamovich in a match for the TNA Knockouts World Championship, Slammiversary where was defeated by Indi Hartwell or Bound for Glory, where she defeated Gia Miller. During her time with TNA, the official weren't happy with Blanchard, since she worked for CMLL. At the time, TNA had a partnership with WWE (and AAA), while CMLL had a partnership with WWE's rival, All Elite Wrestling. On June 16, 2026, Blanchard requested her release and days later, the company granted her. Day later, Blanchard explained TNA asked her to choose between CMLL and TNA.

== Other media ==
Tessa Blanchard

YouTube information
- Channel: Tessa Blanchard
- Years active: 2025–
- Genre: Podcasting
- Subscribers: 15 thousand
- Views: 1.1 million
- Last updated: October 17, 2026

=== Acting ===
Blanchard was the stunt double for actress Florence Pugh in the film Fighting with My Family, produced by Dwayne "The Rock" Johnson, about current WWE wrestler Paige.

== Personal life ==
On November 20, 2019, Blanchard confirmed her engagement to fellow wrestler Miguel Olivo, better known by the ring name Daga. The couple married in August 2020 and resided in Mexico. In January 2023, the couple released a public statement announcing their separation.

In January 2020, multiple female wrestlers came forward with bullying and racism allegations against Blanchard, including an incident involving Blanchard spitting in the face of a Puerto Rican wrestler and calling her a racial slur. The woman in question, Black Rose, later stated that the incident did indeed take place. Blanchard denied the allegations.

On January 1, 2026, Blanchard got engaged to fellow professional wrestler Esfinge.

== Championships and accomplishments ==
- American Pro Wrestling Alliance
  - APWA World Ladies Championship (1 time)
- Canadian Wrestling Federation
  - CWF Women's Championship (1 time)
- Consejo Mundial de Lucha Libre
  - Women’s International Grand Prix (2023)
  - CMLL World Women's Tag Team Championship (1 time) – with Lluvia
  - Copa Dinistias - Herederas (2026)
  - Copa Independencia (2026)
- The Crash
  - The Crash Women's Championship (1 time)
- East Coast Wrestling Association
  - ECWA Women's Championship (1 time)
  - ECWA Super 8 ChickFight Tournament (2014)
- Exodus Wrestling Alliance
  - EWA Heavyweight Championship (1 time)
  - EWA Florida Heavyweight Championship (1 time)
- Impact Wrestling
  - Impact World Championship (1 time)
  - Impact Knockouts Championship (1 time)
  - Mashup Tournament (2019) – with Sami Callihan
  - Impact Year End Awards (4 times)
    - Knockout of the Year (2018)
    - Match of the Year (2019) vs. Sami Callihan at Slammiversary XVII
    - Move of the Year (2019) Magnum
    - Wrestler of the Year (2019)
- Lucha Libre AAA Worldwide
  - AAA Reina de Reinas Championship (1 time)
- Lucky Pro Wrestling
  - Kings And Queens Tournament (2015) – with Anthony Greene
- Noble Champions Group
  - NCG Women's Champion (1 time, current)
- OnlyWrestlers
  - OWA Women's World Championship (1 time, current)
- PCW Ultra
  - PCW Ultra Women's Championship (1 time)
- Pro Wrestling eXpress
  - PWX Women's Championship (1 time)
- Pro Wrestling Illustrated
  - Ranked No. 5 of the top of 100 female wrestlers in the PWI Women's 100 in 2019
  - Ranked No. 83 of the top 500 singles wrestlers in the PWI 500 in 2020
  - Ranked No. 92 of the top 250 female wrestlers of the PWI Female 250 in 2025
- Remix Pro Wrestling
  - Remix Pro Fury Championship (1 time)
- Rise Wrestling
  - Phoenix Of RISE Championship (1 time)
  - Rise Year End Awards (2 times)
    - Match of the Year (2018) vs. Mercedes Martinez in a 75-minute iron woman match on RISE 10: Insanity
    - Moment of The Year (2018) – Mercedes Martinez and Tessa Blanchard set a new world record at RISE 10, the longest one on one women's wrestling match in history at 75 Minutes
- Shimmer Women Athletes
  - Shimmer Tag Team Championship (1 time) – with Vanessa Kraven
- Sports Illustrated
  - Ranked No. 2 of the top 10 women's wrestlers in 2019
- Warrior Wrestling
  - Warrior Wrestling Women's Championship (1 time, inaugural)
- Women of Wrestling
  - WOW World Championship (1 time)
- Women Superstars Uncensored
  - WSU Championship (1 time)
- Women's Wrestling Hall of Fame
  - WWHOF Award (1 time)
    - Most Improved Wrestler of the Year (2025)
- WrestleCircus
  - WC Lady of the Ring Championship (1 time)
  - WC Sideshow Championship (1 time)
- Zelo Pro
  - Zelo Pro Women's Championship (1 time)
