= Women of Wrestling =

Women's professional wrestling promotion

- Founded: 2000
- Style: Professional wrestling
- Headquarters: Los Angeles, California, United States
- Founder: David McLane
- Owner(s): David McLane; Jeanie Buss
- Parent: WOW Television Enterprises, LLC
- Website: https://www.wowe.com/

Women of Wrestling
- Genre: Professional wrestling Women's professional wrestling
- Created by: David McLane
- Developed by: Jeanie Buss
- Starring: WOW Superheroes roster
- Narrated by: David McLane; Stephen Dickey
- Country of origin: United States
- No. of seasons: 11
- No. of episodes: 208

Production
- Production locations: Los Angeles, California; Glendale, California; Las Vegas, Nevada
- Camera setup: Multicamera setup
- Running time: 60 minutes
- Production companies: WOW Television Enterprises; CBS Media Ventures

Original release
- Network: Broadcast syndication (2000–2001; 2022–present); AXS TV (2019–2020)
- Release: September 1, 2000 – present

Women of Wrestling (WOW) is an American women's professional wrestling promotion founded in 2000 by David McLane (who also founded Gorgeous Ladies of Wrestling (GLOW)) as a spiritual successor to GLOW. WOW is based in Los Angeles, California, and is owned by McLane and Los Angeles Lakers owner/president Jeanie Buss.

Initially broadcasting in syndication in the 2000–01 television season, WOW is a sports entertainment–styled product where its talent portrays heavily dramatized characters.

== History ==
=== Early years and relaunch ===
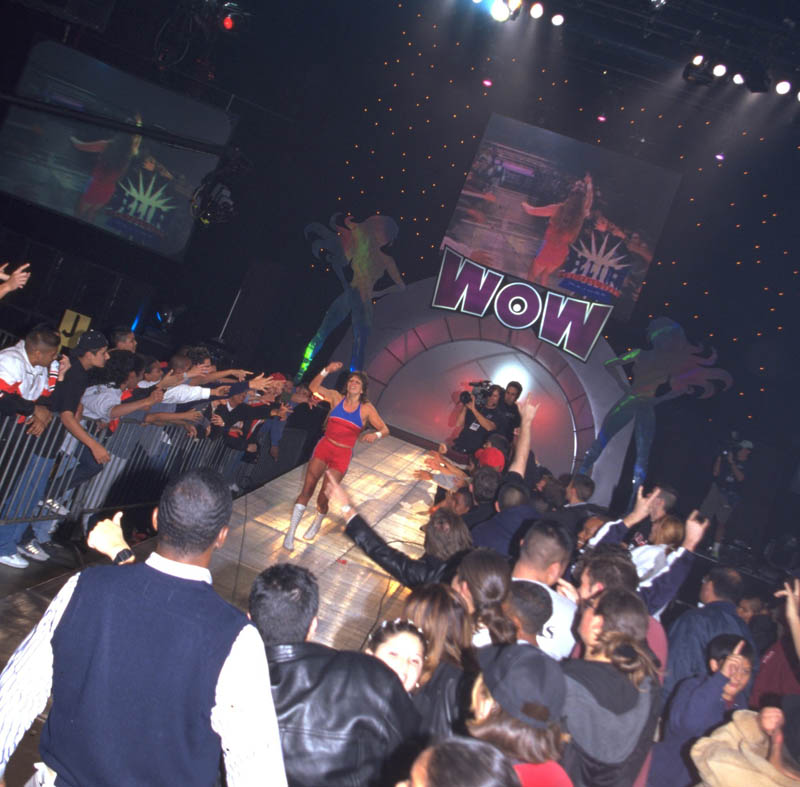
Selina Majors entrance at a WOW! event

WOW has been recognized as one of the few nationally broadcast wrestling promotions featuring an all-female roster. Only 24 television episodes and a pay-per-view event were produced during its initial run. In 2002, McLane sought a partnership with Kiss frontman Gene Simmons to revive the promotion. In July 2011, WOW TV reruns began airing on the ABC affiliate KTNV in Las Vegas.

On May 29, 2012, McLane and Buss announced their intention to revive WOW and produce new episodes. Later that year, WOW reruns began airing on The CW Las Vegas station KVCW starting on December 9.

In December 2014, WOW announced that it would be producing content for digital media in 2015. Marketed as "WOW Superheroes", its roster of characters are portrayed as empowered women from all different backgrounds and professions. A second season premiered on March 1, 2016, on YouTube. Its fourth season premiered February 28, 2017.

On April 20, 2017, MGM Television announced that Mark Burnett, MGM's President, Television Group & Digital, and Jeanie Buss formed a partnership to develop new WOW content across a range of unscripted programming and digital formats. In June 2018, it was announced that tapings for a new weekly program on AXS TV titled WOW: Women of Wrestling would begin on October 10, 2018, at the Belasco Theater in Los Angeles, with episodes airing in early 2019. WOW debuted that January 18 as part of AXS TV's "Friday Night Fights" lineup of shows. The AXS TV premiere marked WOW's first television broadcast of new content in almost eighteen years. WOW: Women of Wrestling ran for two seasons on AXS TV. In June 2020, it was reported that AXS had cancelled the series.

=== Return to syndication ===
On October 6, 2021, it was announced that CBS Media Ventures, the syndication arm of Paramount Global, had entered into a multi-year distribution agreement for WOW that will see new episodes produced for weekend syndication starting in Fall 2022. On October 7, WOW announced that April Mendez (formerly AJ Lee in WWE) joined the company as an executive producer and color commentator.

On January 21, 2022, WOW announced in a press release that "never-before-seen" episodes from "season 7" would debut on Pluto TV and The CW app starting January 22. On August 1, 2022, it was announced that new episodes of the series will begin airing on September 17, 2022, internationally from Paramount Global Content Distribution, the international arm of its United States syndicator CBS Media Ventures. It has also been licensed for broadcast in Canada, Australia (where it airs on Paramount-owned 10 Play) and Indonesia. In December 2022, The New York Times reported that WOW was the highest-rated wrestling television show produced outside of WWE and All Elite Wrestling, ahead of those produced by TNA Wrestling and New Japan Pro Wrestling. This was attributed to the show being available in every cable home in the United States, as well as airings in Canada and Australia.

On December 4, 2022, WOW taped an episode of their weekly television show during LA Comic Con at the Los Angeles Convention Center in Los Angeles, California which aired on March 4, 2023.

On May 16, 2025, Variety reported that Paramount Global Content Distribution would launch Wrestling Central, a free ad-supported streaming television (FAST) channel on The Roku Channel in the United States and Canada. The channel will feature weekly matches from WOW alongside the National Wrestling Alliance (NWA), including new matches, classic episodes, previously unreleased content, specials, and documentaries.

== Seasons ==
=== WOW Unleashed 2001 ===
WOW Unleashed
- Promotion: Women of Wrestling
- Date: February 4, 2001
- City: Inglewood, California
- Venue: Great Western Forum
- Attendance: ~9,500

Pay-per-view chronology
← Previous; N/A	Next → N/A

WOW Unleashed was a professional wrestling pay-per-view from Women of Wrestling. It took place on February 4, 2001, from the Great Western Forum in Inglewood, California. The PPV suffered from technical difficulties and a low buyrate. A second PPV, Spring Vengeance, was announced for April 8, 2001, during Unleashed, but never came to fruition. The announcers were Lee Marshall and former manager Bobby "The Brain" Heenan. Regular announcer David McLane, also the promotion's President, served as Master of Ceremonies.

Event results

Match No.	Episode 18 (taped on February 2, 2001, aired on February 4, 2001)	Stipulations	Times
1	Randi Rah Rah defeated Jacklyn Hyde	Singles match	2:15
2	The Beach Patrol (Sandy and Summer) vs. Farah the Persian Princess and Paradise ended in a draw	Tag team match	2:30
3	Tanja the Warrior Woman defeated Jane Blond	Singles match	2:47
4	Nicky Law (with Kristy Order) defeated Hammerin' Heather Steele	Singles match	2:02
5	Boom Boom the Volcano and Caliente defeated The Asian Invasion (Jade and Lotus)	Tag team match	4:43
6	Bronco Billie defeated The Disciplinarian	Singles match	3:55
7	Roxy Powers vs. Slam Dunk ended in a double disqualification	Singles match	6:16
8	Riot defeated Wendi Wheels	Hardcore match	9:40
9	Jungle Grrrl defeated Beckie the Farmers Daughter	Splash match	9:45
10	Caged Heat (Delta Lotta Pain and Loca) defeated Harley's Angels (Charlie Davidson and EZ Rider) (with Thug)	Tag team tournament final match for the inaugural WOW World Tag Team Championship	5:42
11	Terri Gold defeated Danger (c)	Singles rematch for the WOW World Championship	4:20
12	Lana Star and Patti Pizzazz vs. Ice Cold and Poison no contest Lana Star defeated Ice Cold and Poison	Handicap hair vs. hair match (Since Ice Cold was pinned, she had her head shaved)	5:16
13	Thug (with Charlie Davidson and EZ Rider) defeated Selina Majors	Steel cage match	15:01

== Alumnae ==
Ring name	Real name	Notes
Adrenaline	Priscilla Zuniga	Former WOW World Tag Team Champion
Amber O'Neal	Kimberly Dawn Davis	Formerly known as The Beverly Hills Babe Former WOW World Tag Team Champion
Amber Rodriguez	Amber Rodriguez	Formerly known as Sahara Spars
Azúcar	Vanessa Herrera	
The Beast	Twana Barnett-Ferguson	Former WOW World Champion
Beckie the Farmers Daughter	Renee Intlekofer	WOW Original
Boom Boom the Volcano	Patty Bunya-Ananta	WOW Original
Bronco Billie	Lisa Danielle Rachuba	WOW Original
Buggy Nova	Natalie Laura Osman	
Caliente	Rachel Iverson	WOW Original
Cali Ray	Kirsten Young	
Candice LeRae	Candice Dawson	
Casey Dakota	Sarah Stallman	
Charlie Davidson	Charlie Davidson	WOW Original
Christina Von Eerie	Christina Von Eerie	Also wrestled as Razor
The Dagger	Michelle Blanchard	
Danger	Elle Alexander	WOW Original Former WOW World Champion
Delta Lotta Pain	Jwaundace Candece	WOW Original Former WOW World Tag Team Champion
Desdemeana the Soldier of Darkness	Andrea VanEpps	
The Disciplinarian	Kristen Davidson Robyn Reid	WOW Original, also wrestled as Misery
Eye Candy	Danielle Paultre	
EZ Rider	Eleanor Kerrigan	WOW Original
Faith The Lioness	Faith Jefferies	
Farah The Persian Princess	Telma Roshanravan	WOW Original
Fire	Kiera Hogan Taylor Lewis	Former WOW World Tag Team Champion
Frenchie	Marie Gibeault	
Frost the Olympian	Janeshia Adams-Ginyard	
GI Jane	Quanice Jackson	
Glitch the Gamer	Alicia Bellamy	
Hammerin' Heather Steele	Christina Tomaziesski Colby	WOW Original
Hazard	Elizabeth Crist	
Ice Cold	Inga Waggoner	WOW Original
Ivy Quinn	unknown	
Jacklyn Hyde	Vasilika Vanya Marinkovic	WOW Original
Jade	Jennifer Lee Chan	WOW Original
Jane Blond	Ella Carter	WOW Original
Jennifer Florez	Jazmin Allure	
Jessicka Havok	Jessica Cricks	
Jolene Dixie	Airial Le	
Jolynn Dixie	Cathy Le	
Jungle Grrrl	Erica Porter	WOW Original Former WOW World Champion
Kaoz	Steffanie Manukainiu	
Kitty	Holly Michelle Meowy	Former manager of Lana Star
Kona	Ashley Manukainiu	
Kharma	unknown	
Khloe Hurtz	Katie Forbes	
Kiara Dillon	Monique Martin	
Krissy Vaine	Kristin Eubanks	
Kristy Order	unknown	WOW Original
La Niña	Melissa Santos	
Lady London	Georgina Rawlings	
Leia Makoa	Reka Tehaka	
Loca	Cher Ferreyra	WOW Original Former WOW World Tag Team Champion
Lotus	Jeannie Kim	WOW Original
Malia Hosaka	Malia Hosaka	
Mezmeriah	Arelys Rodriguez Silva	
Misery	Kristen Davidson	WOW Original Also wrestled as The Disciplinarian
Mystery	Nicole Ochoa	WOW Original Also wrestled as Vendetta
Nicky Law	unknown	WOW Original
Nikki Krampus	Ragnhild Bjoerge	
Paradise	Maria Nunez	WOW Original
Patti Pizzazz	unknown	WOW Original Formerly known as Patti Pep
The Phantom	Lynnette Thredgold	WOW Original
Poison	Kina Van Vleet	WOW Original
Randi Rah Rah	unknown Kelsey Hornack	WOW Original Former WOW World Tag Team Champion
Ray Lyn	Rachel Kelvington	
Razor	Christina Von Eerie Sarah Wolfe	
Rebel Haze	Mandy O'Shaughness	
Reyna Reyes	Gisele Shaw	Formerly known as Azteca
Riot	April Kathryn Littlejohn	WOW Original
Robbie Rocket	Johnnie Robbie	
Roxy Powers	Natalie T. Yeo	WOW Original
Sandy	Tamie Sheffield	WOW Original
Sassy Massy	Alisha Edwards	
Selina Majors	Selina Majors	WOW Original
Serpentine	Melissa Cervantes	Formerly known as Kobra Moon
Slam Dunk	Famisha Jones-Millman	WOW Original
Spike	Hudson Envy	
Summer	Bobbi Billard	WOW Original
Sunshine	Jamila Griffith	
Tanja the Warrior Woman	Tanja Richter	WOW Original
Tatevik the Gamer	Tatevik Hunanyan	
The Temptress	Katarina Waters	
Terri Gold	Heather Lee-Millard	WOW Original Former WOW World Champion
Tessa Blanchard	Tessa Blanchard	Former WOW World Champion
Thug	Peggy Lee Leather	WOW Original
Vendetta	Nicole Ochoa	WOW Original Also wrestled as Mystery
Vickie Lynn McCoy	Kelsey De Journett	
Vivian Rivera	Everly Rivera	
Wrecking Ball	Heidi Howitzer	
Wendi Wheels	Rebecca Gravell	WOW Original Formerly known as Sunny

== Championships ==
As of October 14, 2026.

Championship	Current champion(s)	Reign	Date won	Days held	Location	Notes	Ref.
WOW World Championship	Penelope Pink	2	October 14, 2025	365+	Las Vegas, NV	Defeated Tormenta. This episode aired on tape delay on February 21, 2026, at WOW Season 11: Episode 20	
WOW World Tag Team Championship	Tara Strike and Ashley Blaze	1	October 22, 2025	357+	Las Vegas, NV	Defeated Miami's Sweet Heat (Lindsey Carlson and Laurie Carlson) and Best 4 Business (Kara Kai and Sandy Shore) in a Triple Threat match. This episode aired on tape delay on May 23, 2026, at WOW Season 11: Episode 33	
WOW World Trios Championship	Monsters and Metal (Chainsaw, Daisy Lane and Fury)	1	March 14, 2026	214+	Las Vegas, NV	Defeated Top Tier (Coach Campanelli, Gloria Glitter and Kandi Krush). This episode aired on tape delay on March 14, 2026, at WOW Season 11: Episode 23	

== Controversy ==
The professional women's wrestling industry has a fair share of controversy associated with it across several decades and Women of Wrestling has had their fair share of controversy associated with the program.

In 2020, professional wrestler Tessa Blanchard was under scrutiny for allegations of racism and bullying. After this controversy she was featured on Women of Wrestling as a rehabilitation project for her; yet this eventually led to a falling out between the two resulting in Blanchard being cut from the program. Many wrestlers have spoken out against Blanchard, yet Women of Wrestling has not made an official statement regarding her disappearance.

Current controversy surrounds the removal of the Tonga Twins from the program in 2024 as they have allegations of bullying and intentionally hurting other wrestlers. It is unclear whether the Tonga Twins were pushed to leave or otherwise fired by WOW. Many WOW wrestlers have spoken out against the Tonga Twins, including Princess Aussie and Wrecking Ball. The Tonga Twins last criticized the Women of Wrestling program for character defamation and have since not released a public statement regarding their experience on the show. The Women of Wrestling program has not released an official statement regarding the removal of the Tonga Twins either.

== WOW World Trios Title History ==
The WOW World Trios Championship is a women's professional wrestling tag team championship created and promoted by the American professional wrestling promotion Women of Wrestling (WOW). Monsters & Metal (Chainsaw, Daisy Lane and Fury) are the current champions in their first reign.

WOW World Trios Championship

Details
- Promotion: Women of Wrestling (WOW)
- Date established: December 12, 2023
- Current champions: Monsters & Metal (Chainsaw, Daisy Lane and Fury)
- Date won: March 14, 2026
Statistics
- First champions: Top Tier (Coach Campanelli, Gloria Glitter and Kandi Krush)

=== Tournaments ===
==== Inaugural WOW trios tag team Championship tournament (season 9) 2023–2024 ====
Quarterfinals

(December 11, 2023)

Semifinals

(December 11 and 12,, 2023)

Finals

(December 12, 2023) WOW Season 9: Episode 27

Team IQ Superior (The Classmaster, The Disciplinarian and GI Jane) (with Samantha Smart)
5:25

Team Spirit (Ariel Sky, Coach Campanelli and Pep Riley)
Pin

Team Spirit (Ariel Sky, Pep Riley and Sasha Sparks) (with Coach Campanelli) (ended in a no contest)

Team Spirit (Coach Campanelli, Pep Riley and Sasha Sparks) (with Ariel Sky)
4:46

Pin

The Brat Pack (ended in a no contest)

The Brat Pack
4:46

5:01

The Brat Pack (BK Rhythm, Gigi Gianni and Lil J-Boogie)
Pin

Spring Break 24/7 (Crystal Waters and Sandy Shore) and Chantilly Chella)
4:47

Team Spirit (Ariel Sky, Pep Riley and Sasha Sparks) (with Coach Campanelli) (no contest)

Coach Campanelli, Gloria Glitter and Kandi Krush (with Ariel Sky, Pep Riley and Sasha Sparks)
NC

Pin

Team Exile (no contest)

Team Exile
NC

6:32

Team Exile (Exodus, Genesis and Ice Cold)
Pin

The Mighty Mights (Spice and Sugar) and Stephy Slays
5:25

Team Exile
Pin

El Clan Latino
4:06

El Clan Latino (Sylvia Sanchez, Tormenta and Vivian Rivera) (with the Atty. Sophia Lopez)
Pin

The Mighty Mights (Spice and Sugar) and Keta Rush
4:39

=== Reigns ===
Key
No.	Overall reign number
Reign	Reign number for the specific champion
Days	Number of days held

No.	Champion	Championship change			Reign statistics		Notes	Ref.
No.	Champion	Date	Event	Location	Reign	Days	Notes	Ref.
Women of Wrestling (WOW)
1	Top Tier (Coach Campanelli, Gloria Glitter and Kandi Krush)	December 12, 2023	WOW Season 9: Episode 27	Los Angeles, CA	1	823	Coach Campanelli replaced the other existing members of Team Spirit (Ariel Sky, Pep Riley and Sasha Sparks) with Gloria Glitter and Kandi Krush to defeat Team Exile (Exodus, Genesis and Ice Cold) to become the inaugural trios champions. The winning team took the name Top Tier. This episode aired on tape delay on March 16, 2024 at WOW Season 9: Episode 27	
2	Monsters & Metal (Chainsaw, Daisy Lane and Fury)	March 14, 2026	WOW Season 11: Episode 23	Fremont Street Experience, Las Vegas	1	214+	Full Metal Massacre match. This episode aired on tape delay on March 14, 2026 at WOW Season 11: Episode 23. The taping date is unknown	

=== Combined reigns ===
As of October 14, 2026.

=== By team ===
†	Indicates the current champion

Rank	Team	No. ofreigns	Combined days
1	Top Tier(Coach Campanelli, Gloria Glitter and Kandi Krush)	1	823
2	Monsters & Metal(Chainsaw, Daisy Lane and Fury) †	1	214+

=== By wrestler ===
Rank	Wrestler	No. of reigns	Combineddays
1	Coach Campanelli	1	823
1	Gloria Glitter	1	823
1	Kandi Krush	1	823
4	Chainsaw †	1	214+
4	Daisy Lane †	1	214+
4	Fury †	1	214+
