= The Singles (Basement Jaxx album) =

2005 compilation album by Basement Jaxx

Greatest hits album by Basement Jaxx
- Released: 21 March 2005
- Recorded: 1996–2004
- Genres: House; dance
- Length: 57:32
- Label: XL
- Producers: Simon Ratcliffe; Felix Buxton

Basement Jaxx chronology
Kish Kash (2003)	The Singles (2005)	Crazy Itch Radio (2006)

Singles from The Singles
- 1. "Oh My Gosh" Released: 14 March 2005; 2. "U Don't Know Me" Released: 13 June 2005; 3. "Do Your Thing" Released: 26 September 2005

The Singles is the first greatest hits album by English electronic music duo Basement Jaxx, released on 21 March 2005 via XL. The album contains two new songs, "Oh My Gosh" and "U Don't Know Me", which were both released as singles. "Do Your Thing" was previously included on the 2001 Rooty album, but with the release of this compilation album, the single was re-released in the UK after the two aforementioned singles.

Later editions of The Singles included the "JaxxHouz" radio edit of "U Don't Know Me" in place of the original album version. A special edition of the release included a second disc of previously unreleased material.

== Background and release ==
Talking about the compilation, Buxton told Canadian music magazine The Record:

[...] It's a collection of all our popular songs really, a collection where people could get all the main songs that they liked. It seemed like a good idea to put it out now because a lot of people were coming to our shows and didn't really know that a song like "Romeo" was by the same people who did "Where's Your Head At". Our music [across the years] is quite different so it has probably taken people a while to realise that it's all by the same band. So yeah, that was why really. It could be a collection for people who'd only just found out about us, or seen a live show and wanted to get our music.

"Oh My Gosh" was the first single from the album. Released simultaneously with the album was The Videos, a video album containing the group's music videos, several live tracks, and four extra video clips.

== Critical reception ==
Professional ratings
Review scores
Source	Rating
AllMusic	4.5/5 stars
MusicOMH	(favorable)
NME	4/10
Pitchfork	9.5/10

Andy Kellman from AllMusic gave the album a very positive review, calling it "a timely and nearly faultless stop-gap compilation."

PopMatters ranked the album the 19th-best reissue of 2005.

== Promotion ==
Basement Jaxx embarked on the Live 2006 tour of the UK in support of the album, which began on 28 November 2006 in Plymouth, England and ended on 8 December 2006 in Glasgow, Scotland. In total there were eight shows.

=== Glastonbury Festival headlining ===
On 6 June 2005, it was announced last-minute that the duo would replace Kylie Minogue as headliners for the 2005 Glastonbury Festival due to Minogue being diagnosed with breast cancer. According to The Guardian, the reactions to this news were "muted". Basement Jaxx's headlining was said to be a departure from the usual rock bands that used to headline the festival, as was Minogue's planned appearance.

While performing onstage, Scottish musician Bobby Gillespie called the band "Cocksuckers – no offence to cocksuckers," before slating everyone from Minogue to the crowd itself and eventually getting booed off stage. Basement Jaxx's vocalist Vula Malinga recalls: "I remember us girls were like 'WHAT? Shut Up! Come on let's take him! Warrrgh', but the guys were just like 'Everyone's entitled to their opinion.' In the end I think the crowd spoke for itself."

Despite heavy rainfall during the year's festival, the duo's performance was well received. They also included a carnival version of Motörhead's "Ace of Spades" in their set.

== Track listing ==
The Singles track listing
No.	Title	Writer(s)	Length
1.	"Red Alert" (featuring Blue James)	Ratcliffe; Buxton; Harvey Mason; Tyrone Brown; John Blake Jr.; Leonard Gibbs; James Simmons; Richard Steacker; Millard Vinson	3:37
2.	"Good Luck" (featuring Lisa Kekaula)	Ratcliffe; Buxton; Kekaula	3:32
3.	"Romeo" (featuring Kele Le Roc)	Ratcliffe; Buxton	3:26
4.	"Oh My Gosh" (featuring Vula Malinga)	Ratcliffe; Buxton	3:57
5.	"Bingo Bango"	Ratcliffe; Buxton; Bolivar	3:48
6.	"Where's Your Head At" (featuring Damien Peachey)	Gary Numan; Ratcliffe; Buxton	4:00
7.	"Rendez-Vu"	Ratcliffe; Buxton	3:45
8.	"Jump n' Shout" (featuring Slarta John)	Ratcliffe; Buxton; Mark James	3:39
9.	"Lucky Star" (featuring Dizzee Rascal)	D.Mills; Ratcliffe; Buxton	3:54
10.	"Plug It In" (featuring JC Chasez)	Ratcliffe; Buxton	3:20
11.	"U Don't Know Me" (featuring Lisa Kekaula) (later replaced by JaxxHouz Radio Edit, running 2:56)	Ratcliffe; Buxton; Kekaula	3:36
12.	"Do Your Thing" (featuring Elliot May)	Ratcliffe; Buxton; Blue Mitchell	4:20
13.	"Jus 1 Kiss"	Ratcliffe; Buxton; Bernard Edwards; Nile Rodgers	3:37
14.	"Flylife"	Ratcliffe; Buxton	4:04
15.	"Samba Magic"	Ratcliffe; Buxton; Jorge Dalto; Tite Curet Alonso	4:50

Special edition bonus disc – Bonus Traxx
No.	Title	Writer(s)	Length
1.	"Magnificent Romeo"	Ratcliffe; Buxton; Joe Strummer; Mick Jones; Paul Simonon; Topper Headon	4:28
2.	"I Beg U"	Ratcliffe; Buxton	3:42
3.	"Mere Pass"	Ratcliffe; Buxton; Earl Anthony Johnson; Najma Akhtar; Jonathan Richman	4:29
4.	"Miracles Keep on Playin'" (Red Alert Remix)	Ratcliffe; Buxton; Mark Capanni; Bobby Taylor	4:34
5.	"Bongoloid"	Ratcliffe; Buxton	4:22
6.	"Good Luck" (Live)	Ratcliffe; Buxton; Kekaula	4:53
7.	"Rendez-Vu" (Latin Version)	Ratcliffe; Buxton	4:07
8.	"Broken Dreams" (Acoustic)	Ratcliffe; Buxton	2:42
9.	"Ha Choo"	Ratcliffe; Buxton	2:35
10.	"Onyx"	Ratcliffe; Buxton	4:10
11.	"I Live in Camberwell"	Ratcliffe; Buxton	3:38
12.	"Camberskank"	Ratcliffe; Buxton	5:43
13.	"Jus 1 Kiss" (The Isley Bootleg)	Ratcliffe; Buxton; O'Kelly Isley Jr.; Ronald Isley; Rudolph Isley	5:02
14.	"Romeo" (Acoustic)	Ratcliffe; Buxton	3:35

== Personnel ==
Basement Jaxx

- Felix Buxton – production, mixing, lead vocals (on "Rendez-Vu" and "Jus 1 Kiss")
- Simon Ratcliffe – production, mixing

Additional musicians

- 2 Many DJ's – remixing (on "Magnificent Romeo")
- Quentin Collins – trumpet (on "Mere Pass", "Broken Dreams (Acoustic)" and "Romeo (Acoustic)")
- Nathan "Tugg" Curran – drums (on "Good Luck", "Good Luck (Live)"
- Ugo Delmirani – keyboards (on "Bingo Bango"), piano (on "Broken Dreams (Acoustic)" and "Romeo (Acoustic)")
- The London Session Orchestra – strings (on "Good Luck" and "Good Luck (Live)")
- Wil Malone – string arrangement and conducting (on "Good Luck" and "Good Luck (Live)")
- Onyx – electric horn (on "Lucky Star")
- Roberto Pla And His Band – instrumentation, backing vocals (on "Rendez-Vu (Latin Version)")
- Oli Savill – percussion (on "Broken Dreams (Acoustic)" and "Romeo (Acoustic)")
- Icarus Wilson-Wright – percussion (on "Good Luck (Live)")
- Gavyn Wright – string conducting (on "Good Luck" and "Good Luck (Live)")

Production

- Patrick Duffy – art direction, design
- Martin Hildred – live engineer (on "Good Luck (Live)")
- Andy Hughes – mixing (on "Good Luck (Live)")
- Geoff Pesche – mastering

Additional vocalists

- Najma Akhtar – vocals (on "Mere Pass")
- Natasha Awuku – backing vocals (on "Good Luck")
- Jasette Barrett – backing vocals (on "Oh My Gosh")
- JC Chasez – lead vocals (on "Plug It In")
- Cherokee – backing vocals (on "Plug It In")
- Nadia Cielto-Steele – backing vocals (on "Good Luck")
- Roland Clarke – vocals (on "I Beg U")
- Claudia Cum Dominguez – vocals (on "I Beg U")
- Alma Duah – backing vocals (on "Oh My Gosh")
- Corryne Dwyer – backing vocals (on "Romeo" and "Magnificent Romeo")
- Shaun Escoffery – lead vocals (on "Rendez-Vu (Latin Version"), backing vocals (on "U Don't Know Me")
- Sharlene Hector – backing vocals (on "Good Luck")
- Charlotte Hodson – vocals (on "U Don't Know Me")
- Blue James – lead vocals (on "Red Alert" and "Miracles Keep on Playin' (Red Alert Mix)")
- Slarta John – lead vocals (on "Jump N' Shout" and "Bongoloid")
- Neil Jommot – vocals (on "Bongoloid")
- Jorges – "word bitz" (on "Bingo Bango")
- Corrina Joseph – vocals (on "Fly Life")
- KDL Allstars – backing vocals (on "Red Alert")
- Lisa Kekaula – lead vocals (on "Good Luck", "U Don't Know Me" and "Good Luck (Live)")
- Killa Kela – backing vocals (on "Oh My Gosh")
- Glamma Kid – vocals (on "Fly Life")
- Francine Kufonji – backing vocals (on "Good Luck")
- Vula Malinga – lead vocals (on "Oh My Gosh"), backing vocals (on "U Don't Know Me" and "Good Luck (Live)")
- Elliot May – lead vocals (on "Do Your Thing")
- Mona – vocals (on "Lucky Star")
- Michael Moog – backing vocals (on "Where's Your Head At")
- Erick Morillo – vocals (on "I Beg U"), backing vocals (on "Where's Your Head At")
- Nyna – "word bitz" (on "Bingo Bango")
- Damien Peachey – lead vocals (on "Where's Your Head At")
- Daniel Pearce – backing vocals (on "Oh My Gosh" and "U Don't Know Me")
- Dizzee Rascal – lead vocals (on "Lucky Star")
- Ronald Regan – vocals (on "Bongoloid")
- Kele Le Roc – lead vocals (on "Romeo", "Magnificent Romeo", "Broken Dreams (Acoustic)" and "Romeo (Acoustic)"), backing vocals (on "Good Luck")
- Junior Sanchez – backing vocals (on "Where's Your Head At")
- Mandy Senior – backing vocals (on "Plug It In")
- Skillah – rapping (on "Oh My Gosh")
- Slarta's Crew – shouts (on "Jump N' Shout")
- Marsha "Marshmello" Smith – backing vocals (on "Lucky Star")
- Sharon Stone – vocals (on "Bongoloid")
- Madman Swyli – shouts (on "Jump N' Shout")
- Ty – backing vocals (on "Plug It In")
- Cassie Watson – lead vocals (on "Bingo Bango")

== Charts ==
=== Weekly charts ===
Weekly chart performance for The Singles
Chart (2005)	Peak position
Australian Albums (ARIA)	17
Belgian Albums (Ultratop Flanders)	10
Belgian Albums (Ultratop Wallonia)	69
Dutch Albums (Album Top 100)	36
Irish Albums (IRMA)	2
New Zealand Albums (RMNZ)	13
Swedish Albums (Sverigetopplistan)	37
Swiss Albums (Schweizer Hitparade)	41
UK Albums (Official Charts)	1
UK Dance Albums (Official Charts)	1
UK Independent Albums (Official Charts)	1

=== Year-end charts ===
Year-end chart performance for The Singles
Chart (2005)	Position
Belgian Albums (Ultratop Flanders)	98
UK Albums (OCC)	24
Chart (2006)	Position
UK Albums (OCC)	144

== Certifications ==
Certifications for The Singles
Region	Certification	Certified units/sales
United Kingdom (BPI)	3× Platinum	900,000^{‡}
^{‡} Sales+streaming figures based on certification alone.

== The Videos ==
The Videos

Video by Basement Jaxx
- Released: 2005
- Recorded: 1997–2005
- Genre: Electronica
- Label: XL

The Videos is a DVD by Basement Jaxx containing all official music videos, several live tracks, and four extra video clips.

It was released at the same time as The Singles.

=== Track listing ===
The Videos

1. "Red Alert"
2. "Rendez-Vu"
3. "Jump N' Shout"
4. "Bingo Bango"
5. "Romeo"
6. "Jus 1 Kiss"
7. "Where's Your Head At"
8. "Lucky Star"
9. "Good Luck"
10. "Plug It In"
11. "Cish Cash"
12. "Oh My Gosh"
13. "Flylife"

Live Traxx

1. "Red Alert" (Glastonbury 2000)
2. "Jump N' Shout" (Glastonbury 2000)
3. "Do Your Thing" (V2002)
4. "Cish Cash" (Werchter 2004)
5. "Lucky Star" (Fuji Rock 2004)
6. "Good Luck" (Glastonbury 2004)
7. "Supersonic" (Glastonbury 2004)
8. "Where's Your Head At" (Glastonbury 2004)

Extras

1. "The Road to Coachella"
2. "Jaxx TV"
3. "Tokyo Stench"
4. "Bongaloid"

== See also ==
- List of UK Albums Chart number ones of the 2000s
