= Brit Awards 2000 =

British music awards ceremony

- Date: 3 March 2000
- Venue: Earls Court
- Hosted by: Davina McCall
- Most awards: Macy Gray, Robbie Williams and Travis (2)
- Most nominations: The Chemical Brothers (4)

Television/radio coverage
- Network: ITV

Brit Awards 2000 was the 20th edition of the Brit Awards, an annual pop music awards ceremony in the United Kingdom. They are run by the British Phonographic Industry and took place on 3 March 2000 at Earls Court in London.

== Performances ==
Artist(s)	Song(s)
Basement Jaxx	"Bingo Bango"
Five; Queen	"We Will Rock You"
Geri Halliwell	"Bag It Up"
Macy Gray	"I Try"
Ricky Martin	"Livin' la Vida Loca" "The Cup of Life" "María"
Spice Girls	"Spice Up Your Life" "Say You'll Be There" "Holler" "Goodbye"
Stereophonics; Tom Jones	"Mama Told Me Not to Come"
Travis	"Why Does It Always Rain on Me?"
Will Smith	"Will 2K"

== Winners and nominees ==
British Album of the Year (presented by Vinnie Jones)	Soundtrack/Cast Recording (presented by Ronnie Wood and Thora Birch)
Travis – The Man Who; Basement Jaxx – Remedy; The Chemical Brothers – Surrender; Gomez – Liquid Skin; Stereophonics – Performance & Cocktails	Notting Hill; Austin Powers: The Spy Who Shagged Me; Star Wars Episode I: The Phantom Menace; Fight Club; The Matrix
British Single of the Year (presented by Caroline Aherne and Craig Cash)	British Video of the Year (presented by Donna Air and Richard Blackwood)
Robbie Williams – "She's the One"; Basement Jaxx – "Red Alert"; Supergrass – "Moving"; Moloko – "Sing It Back"; Blur – "Tender"; Travis – "Why Does It Always Rain on Me?"; Fatboy Slim – "Praise You"; Manic Street Preachers – "You Stole the Sun from My Heart"; The Chemical Brothers – "Hey Boy Hey Girl"; Shanks and Bigfoot – "Sweet Like Chocolate"	Robbie Williams – "She's the One"; Aphex Twin – "Windowlicker"; Fatboy Slim – "Praise You"; The Chemical Brothers – "Let Forever Be"; Supergrass – "Pumping on Your Stereo"
British Male Solo Artist (presented by Ben Elton)	British Female Solo Artist (presented by Robbie Williams and Tom Jones)
Tom Jones; David Bowie; Ian Brown; Sting; Van Morrison	Beth Orton; Beverley Knight; Gabrielle; Geri Halliwell; Melanie C
British Group (presented by Lou Reed)	British Breakthrough Act (presented by Sara Cox and Zoë Ball)
Travis; Blur; Gomez; Stereophonics; Texas	S Club 7; Groove Armada; Honeyz; Phats & Small; The Wiseguys
British Dance Act (presented by Mark Williams and Paul Whitehouse)	British Pop Act (presented by Anthony McPartlin, Cat Deeley and Declan Donnelly)
The Chemical Brothers; Basement Jaxx; Fatboy Slim; Jamiroquai; Leftfield	Five; Geri Halliwell; Ann Lee; Martine McCutcheon; S Club 7; Steps
International Male Solo Artist (presented by Caprice Bourret and Martin Kemp)	International Female Solo Artist (presented by Sacha Baron Cohen as Ali G)
Beck; Eminem; Moby; Ricky Martin; Will Smith	Macy Gray; Britney Spears; Jennifer Lopez; Mary J. Blige; Whitney Houston
International Group (presented by Andrea Corr and Jim Corr)	International Breakthrough Act (presented by Kylie Minogue and Natalie Imbruglia)
TLC; Beastie Boys; The Cardigans; Mercury Rev; Red Hot Chili Peppers	Macy Gray; Britney Spears; Eminem; Jennifer Lopez; Semisonic
Biggest Selling Live Act of 1999 (presented by Cerys Matthews)	Outstanding Contribution to Music (presented by Will Smith)
Steps	Spice Girls

== List of British Newcomer shortlist ==
British Dance Newcomer

- Brandon Block
- Groove Armada (Runner-up)
- Phats & Small (Runner-up)
- Shanks & Bigfoot
- Spacedust

British Pop Newcomer

- Adam Rickitt
- Ann Lee
- Charlotte Church
- Martine McCutcheon
- S Club 7 (Winner)

British Rock Newcomer

- The Beta Band
- Death in Vegas
- Gay Dad
- Unkle
- The Wiseguys (Runner-up)

British Urban Newcomer

- Fierce
- Glamma Kid
- Honeyz (Runner-up)
- Jamelia
- Kele Le Roc

== Multiple nominations and awards ==
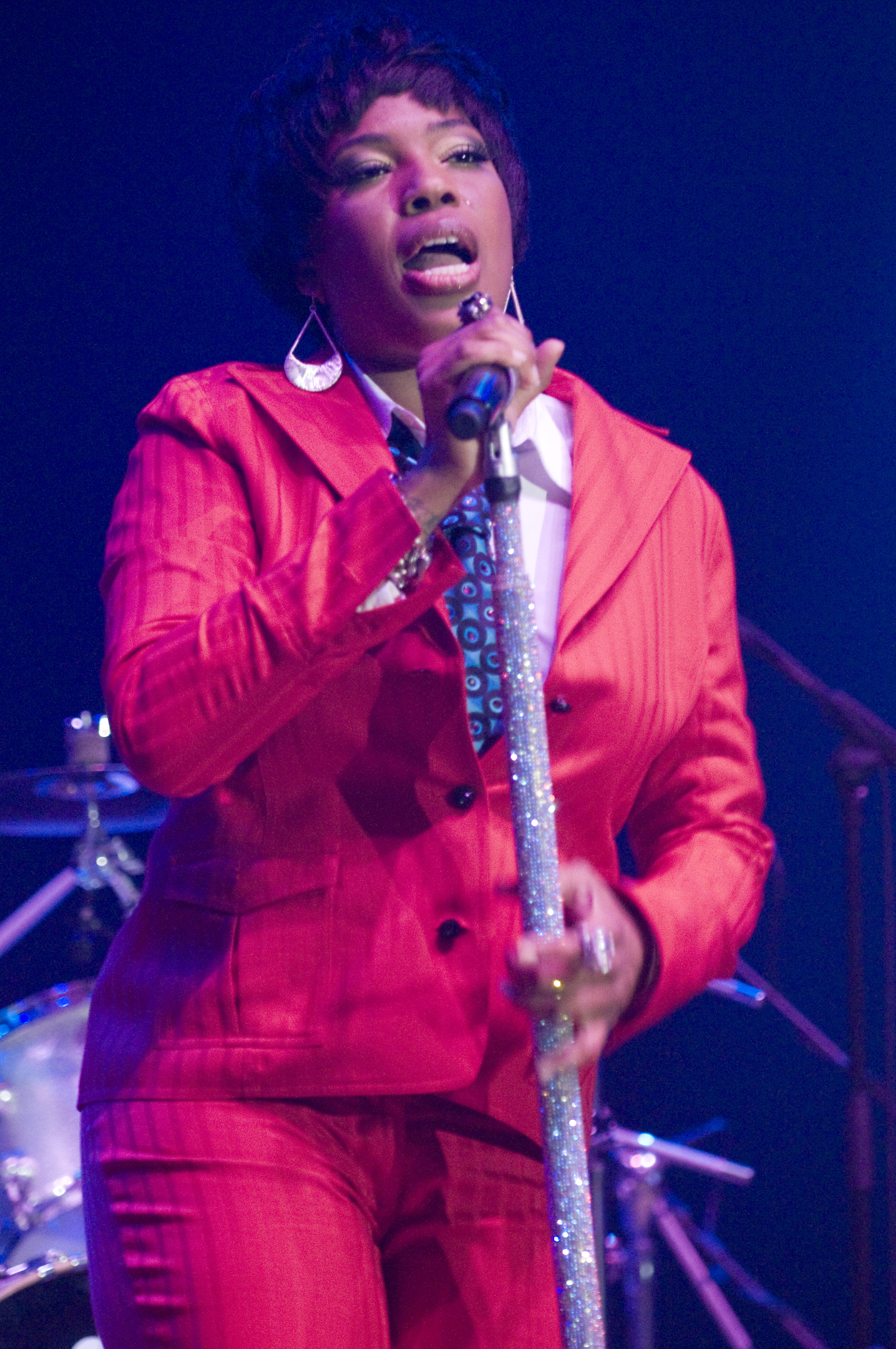
Two-time winner Macy Gray

Artists that received multiple nominations
Nominations	Artist
4	The Chemical Brothers
3 (3)	Basement Jaxx
3 (3)	Fatboy Slim
3 (3)	Travis
2 (11)	Blur
2 (11)	Britney Spears
2 (11)	Eminem
2 (11)	Geri Halliwell
2 (11)	Gomez
2 (11)	Jennifer Lopez
2 (11)	Macy Gray
2 (11)	Robbie Williams
2 (11)	S Club 7
2 (11)	Stereophonics
2 (11)	Supergrass

Artists that received multiple awards
Awards	Artist
2 (3)	Macy Gray
2 (3)	Robbie Williams
2 (3)	Travis

== Notable moments ==
=== Robbie Williams and Liam Gallagher ===
Around the time of his departure from Take That, Robbie Williams had begun a friendship with the Gallagher brothers from Oasis at the Glastonbury Festival. However, it was short-lived and the two parties regularly traded insults in the press with Noel Gallagher referring to Williams as "the fat dancer from Take That". Having won Best British Single and Best Video for "She's the One", Williams challenged Liam Gallagher to a televised fight, saying: "So, anybody like to see me fight Liam? Would you pay to come and see it? Liam, a hundred grand of your money and a hundred grand of my money. We'll get in a ring and we'll have a fight and you can all watch it on TV, what d'you think about that?". Liam Gallagher was not in the country at the time.

=== Ronnie Wood and Brandon Block ===
Dance DJ Brandon Block was told by his friends that he had won an award and had been summoned to the stage to collect it. Because of his advanced state of intoxication he believed them and walked on to the stage, eventually ending up next to a bemused Rolling Stones guitarist Ronnie Wood and actress Thora Birch, who were about to present the award for Best Soundtrack Album. After Block was removed from the stage by security, Wood aimed an insult in his direction, at which Block broke free to square up to the guitarist. A series of insults were then traded between the two, both of which were audible through the stage microphone, causing claims that the whole event may have been staged. Wood then threw his drink into Block's face, and the DJ was ejected from the event. Some time after the incident, Block claimed that he had subsequently apologised to Wood for his behaviour, and Wood had merely brushed it off.

=== Geri Halliwell and the Spice Girls ===
The Spice Girls were set to receive the Outstanding Contribution award at the 2000 Brit awards, reportedly to mark their dominance of the music scene in the past decade. There was much media speculation before and even during the event as to whether or not former Ginger Spice, Geri Halliwell would accept the award with the four remaining members of the group. On the night, however, Halliwell declined to join her former bandmates and instead ensured front-page coverage the following day by performing her solo single "Bag It Up" straddling a pole between a pair of giant inflatable legs. Near the end of the awards, the Spice Girls performed "Spice Up Your Life", an a cappella version of "Say You'll Be There", "Holler" and "Goodbye". When the group accepted their award for "Outstanding Contribution To Music", they thanked Geri Halliwell for her part in the band's success.
