= Get Me Off =

2002 single by Basement Jaxx

Single by Basement Jaxx

from the album Rooty
- Released: 17 June 2002
- Genre: House
- Length: 4:49
- Label: XL
- Songwriters: Simon Ratcliffe; Felix Buxton; Merrill Beth Nisker
- Producer: Basement Jaxx

Basement Jaxx singles chronology
"Where's Your Head At" (2001)	"Get Me Off" (2002)	"Do Your Thing" (2003)

"Get Me Off" is a song by British electronic music duo Basement Jaxx. The song was originally intended for Janet Jackson after she contacted the duo to collaborate for her seventh album, All for You. "Get Me Off" was released on 17 June 2002 as the fourth single from their second studio album, Rooty (2001). The song reached number 22 in the United Kingdom, number 43 in Australia, and number 47 in Ireland. It is their only single from 1996 to 2005 that was not included on their greatest hits album, The Singles (2005).

== Background ==
Upon expressing admiration for the Basement Jaxx's debut album Remedy, Janet Jackson contacted the duo to collaborate. Jackson was offered the song for the album, though declined. "She told us she loved our stuff," recalls Buxton, "but she thought we were Zero 7. We wished her every success in hooking up with a British dance duo eventually and said, 'Cheerio, Celine.'"

== Chart performance ==
"Get Me Off" debuted and peaked at number 22 on the UK Singles Chart before falling to number 34 in its second week. The song spent a total of three weeks in the Top 75. The song also reached the top 50 in Australia and Ireland.

== Track listings ==
UK CD 1
No.	Title	Length
1.	"Get Me Off" (Jaxx 2002 Remix Radio Edit)	4:04
2.	"Do Your Thing" (Jaxx Club Remixx)	6:38
3.	"Broken Dreams" (Los Amigos Invisibles Remix)	3:33

UK CD 2
No.	Title	Length
1.	"Get Me Off" (Jaxx 2002 Club Mix)	7:25
2.	"Get Me Off" (Peaches Remix)	3:14
3.	"Get Me Off" (Supergetoff Remix)	9:17

== Charts ==
=== Weekly charts ===
Weekly chart performance for "Get Me Off"
Chart (2002–2003)	Peak position
Australia (ARIA)	43
Canada (Nielsen SoundScan)	31
Europe (Eurochart Hot 100)	81
Ireland (IRMA)	47
Ireland Dance (IRMA)	4
Scotland Singles (Official Charts)	27
UK Singles (Official Charts)	22
UK Dance (Official Charts)	1
UK Indie (Official Charts)	4
US Dance Club Songs (Billboard) Superchumbo & Peaches Remixes	26

=== Year-end charts ===
Year-end chart performance for "Get Me Off"
Chart (2002)	Position
Canada (Nielsen SoundScan)	190

== Covers and remixes ==
Canadian electronic musician Peaches included her remix of "Get Me Off" as a bonus track for her album Fatherfucker.
