= U Don't Know Me (Basement Jaxx song) =

2005 single by Basement Jaxx

Single by Basement Jaxx featuring Lisa Kekaula

from the album The Singles
- Released: 13 June 2005
- Genre: Rock
- Length: 3:36 (album version); 3:20 (radio edit); 2:58 (JaxxHouz radio edit)
- Label: XL; Remote Control
- Songwriters: Simon Ratcliffe; Felix Buxton; Lisa Kekaula
- Producer: Basement Jaxx

Basement Jaxx singles chronology
"Oh My Gosh" (2005)	"U Don't Know Me" (2005)	"Do Your Thing" (2005)

Lisa Kekaula singles chronology
"Good Luck" (2005)	"U Don't Know Me" (2005)	""I Got A Right / Heavy Liquid"" (2014)

Music video
- "U Don't Know Me" on YouTube

"U Don't Know Me" is a song written and produced by English electronic music duo Basement Jaxx. The Bellrays' lead singer Lisa Kekaula, who has previously appeared on Basement Jaxx's 2004 single "Good Luck", also co-wrote and contributed the song's main vocal. "U Don't Know Me" was described as a rock song with "kiss-off" lyrics that were similar to "Good Luck". On 13 June 2005 XL released the track as the second single from their greatest hits album The Singles. Later editions of the compilation replaced the album version with the "JaxxHouz Radio edit" which was also featured in the song's video.

The song received mixed reviews from critics. Its accompanying music video, directed by Mat Kirkby, features a Queen Elizabeth II look-alike drinking and fighting in Soho, London. Due to the content, MTV decided to only broadcast it after the 7:00 pm watershed in the United Kingdom. Commercially, the track reached number 26 on the UK Singles Chart and charted in Finland and Australia. On television, "U Don't Know Me" was featured in Six Feet Under and CSI: Miami.

== Background and composition ==
In March 2005, Basement Jaxx released their first greatest hits album The Singles, which included two new songs, "U Don't Know Me" and "Oh My Gosh". Members of the duo—Simon Ratcliffe and Felix Buxton—and The Bellrays' lead singer Lisa Kekaula wrote "U Don't Know Me". Kekaula, who appeared on their 2004 single "Good Luck", also contributed the song's main vocal. In an interview with Billboard in February 2005, Buxton revealed that their record label XL was going to release the two new tracks as their next singles. Ultimately, "U Don't Know Me" was the second single from the album and was released on 13 June 2005.

According to Daniel Montesinos-Donaghy of Thump, "U Don't Know Me" is a rock song that features beatboxing, drums, xylophones, a keyboard solo and backing vocalists that "offer more joyful 'woo's than you would expect". Its production also contains "heavy" electronic pressing, in the words of musicOMH's Charlotte Lyon. Lyrically, Montesinos described the song as "another kiss-off" track from the group that is similar to "Good Luck". Vula Malinga, Daniel Pearce and Shaun Escoffery (credited as Sean Escoffery) are three of the four performers who provided backing vocals for the track.

== Critical and commercial reception ==
Writing for the Seattle Weekly, Michaelangelo Matos said "U Don't Know Me" sounds like an outtake from the duo's last album, Kish Kash (2003). In a more negative tone, Charlotte Lyon from musicOMH called the song the "weakest" of The Singles. She said: "The heavy electronic pressing gives it a strong likeability, but unlike the rest of the tracks, you’ve heard it somewhere before." Thump's Daniel Montesinos-Donaghy also gave a mixed review. He felt the song was "nowhere near as euphoric" as Basement Jaxx and Kekaula's previous collaboration, "Good Luck", and that the track was only their rock songwriting "exercise". He added: "Of course, a Basement Jaxx version of a rock song is different from anything you'll catch playing in your local dive bar." Despite feeling the verses were "underwritten", Montesinos still praised the chorus and its many "embellishments" for being "sassy fun". In contrast to other reviewers, Evan Sawdey of the webzine PopMatters called the track "stellar".

"U Don't Know Me" debuted and peaked at number 26 on the UK Singles Chart of 25 June 2005. In other territories, the song charted at number 12 in Finland and number 56 in Australia.

== Promotion ==
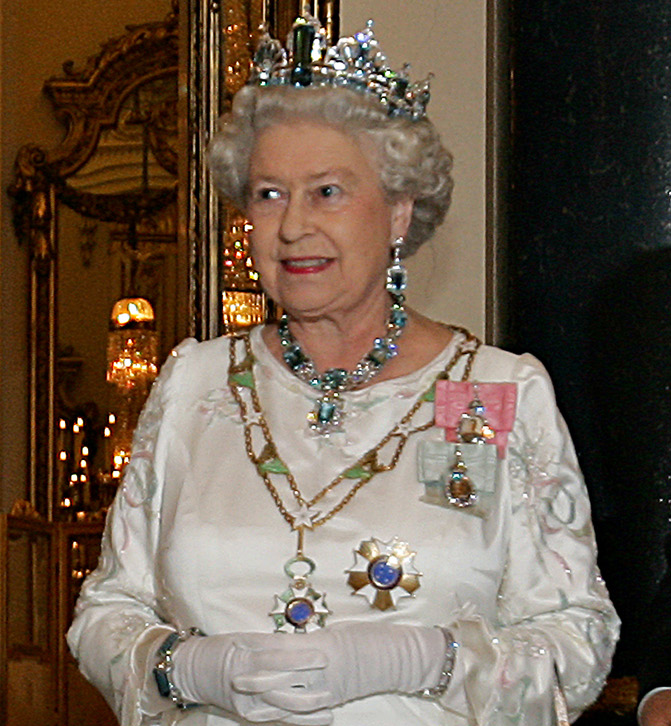
The music video for "U Don't Know Me" features a look-alike of Queen Elizabeth II (pictured)

Mat Kirkby, who directed the music videos for "Good Luck" and "Oh My Gosh", directed the video for "U Don't Know Me". It uses the "JaxxHouz" version of the song, and features a Queen Elizabeth II look-alike drinking, eating kebab, fighting with bouncers, fighting with a woman in an alley, and fleeing police during a night out in Soho, London. In an interview with Canadian music magazine The Record, Buxton said:

Because the song is called "U Don't Know Me," [Kirkby] thought it would be quite interesting for it to be about the Queen and to have her on a night off, sort of just going out, just leaving her bodyguards behind … so [it's about] do we really know the Queen, the people in the media, do we really know them?

A scene from the video which shows the look-alike groping a lapdancer, led MTV in the United Kingdom to broadcast it only after the 7:00 pm watershed to adhere to Ofcom regulations. Kirkby, who later edited a less offensive alternative version of the video, did not understand their decision on banning the scene. He pointed out: "They seemed happy with her drinking and being surrounded by drug dealers." However, a spokeswoman for MTV told the BBC that the clip was, indeed, a "great video", and they were planning on giving it heavy rotation in evening schedules. Buxton told The Record: "MTV wasn't allowed to play it in the daytime in the UK at the beginning but yeah, people seem to enjoy it. It's not malicious, it's more a bit of fun." The clip was nominated for Best Video at the 2005 Antville Music Video Awards.

In other media, "U Don't Know Me" was included on "Hold My Hand", an episode from the fifth season of Six Feet Under, which aired on 20 June 2005. Later, on 14 November that year, it appeared on "Nailed", an episode from the fourth season of CSI: Miami. The song is also part of the setlist for Basement Jaxx's 2006 live tour promoting The Singles.

== Track listings and formats ==
Australia and New Zealand CD single

1. "U Don't Know Me" (featuring Lisa Kekaula) (JaxxHouz Radio Edit) – 2:58
2. "U Don't Know Me" (featuring Lisa Kekaula) (Original Radio Edit) – 3:20
3. "Close 2 U" – 3:21
4. "U Don't Know Me" (featuring Lisa Kekaula) (Solid Groove Remix) – 6:27
5. "U Don't Know Me" (featuring Lisa Kekaula) (JaxxHouz KlubMix) – 5:16

Germany maxi single

1. "U Don't Know Me" (featuring Lisa Kekaula) – 3:34
2. "Oh My Gosh" (featuring Vula Malinga) – 3:56

UK and Germany 12-inch single

1. "U Don't Know Me" (featuring Lisa Kekaula) (JaxxHouz KlubMix) – 5:16
2. "U Don't Know Me" (featuring Lisa Kekaula) (Solid Groove Remix) – 6:27

UK CD single No. 1

1. "U Don't Know Me" (featuring Lisa Kekaula) (JaxxHouz Radio Edit) – 2:58
2. "U Don't Know Me" (featuring Lisa Kekaula) (Original Radio Edit) – 3:20

UK CD single No. 2

1. "U Don't Know Me" (featuring Lisa Kekaula) (JaxxHouz KlubMix) – 5:16
2. "Close 2 U" – 3:21
3. "U Don't Know Me" (featuring Lisa Kekaula) (Solid Groove Remix) – 6:27

== Credits and personnel ==
Credits are adapted from the liner notes of the CD single and The Singles.

Recording and management

- Mastered by Geoff Pesche at The Townhouse, London
- Published by Universal Music/Mele Kekaula Music (BMI)/Songs of Windswept
- All rights on behalf of Mele Kekaula Music administrated by Songs of Windswept
- Lisa Kekaula appears courtesy of The Bellrays

Personnel

- Simon Ratcliffe – writing, production, mixing
- Felix Buxton – writing, production, mixing
- Lisa Kekaula – writing, main vocal
- Charlotte Hodson – bridge vocal
- Vula Malinga – backing vocal
- Daniel Pearce – backing vocal
- Sean Escoffery – backing vocal
- Aurora Ellis – backing vocal
- Patrick Duffy – art direction, design
- HQ – graffiti

== Charts ==
Chart (2005)	Peak position
Australia (ARIA)	56
Finland (Suomen virallinen lista)	12
Ireland (IRMA)	38
Ireland Dance (IRMA)	7
Scotland Singles (Official Charts)	26
UK Singles (Official Charts)	26
UK Indie (Official Charts)	3

== Release history ==
Region	Date	Format(s)	Label(s)	Ref.
United Kingdom	13 June 2005	12-inch vinyl; CD	XL	
Australia	11 July 2005	12-inch vinyl; CD	XL; Remote Control	
