= Romeo (Basement Jaxx song) =

2001 single by Basement Jaxx

Single by Basement Jaxx

from the album Rooty
- B-side: "Bongoloid"; "Camberwell Skies" (demo mix)
- Released: 4 June 2001
- Genre: Pop; dance-pop; 2-step garage; bhangra; disco
- Length: 3:36
- Label: XL
- Songwriters: Felix Buxton; Simon Ratcliffe
- Producers: Felix Buxton; Simon Ratcliffe

Basement Jaxx singles chronology
"Bingo Bango" (2000)	"Romeo" (2001)	"Jus 1 Kiss" (2001)

Music video
- "Romeo" on YouTube

"Romeo" is a song by English electronic music duo Basement Jaxx, released as the first single from their second studio album, Rooty (2001). British R&B singer Kele Le Roc provides the track's lead vocals while Corryne Dwyer sings the background vocals. The song was released on 4 June 2001 as the first single from Rooty.

"Romeo" received acclaim from music critics, with many referring to it as one of the best dancefloor anthems to date. "Romeo" also experienced commercial success, becoming one of Basement Jaxx's biggest international hits, peaking at number six in their native United Kingdom and reaching the top 10 in Canada, New Zealand and Norway. The song has an accompanying Bollywood-inspired music video, which features Divya Dutta.

== Song information ==
After the success of the group's first album Remedy, the group had decided to record and compose a new studio album. "Romeo" was one of the first songs recorded, composed and produced by the group. The production of the song was held off because the group had just issued their compilation album Jaxx Unreleased (2000). "Romeo" was released on 4 June 2001 as the first single of the duo's second album Rooty (2001). The vocals of the song were sung by British R&B singer Kele Le Roc while Corryne Dwyer performs the background vocals. The song was produced and written by Felix Buxton and Simon Ratcliffe themselves. Romeo is a pop song that includes several disco and house music influences, and it samples "Don't Let My Rainbow Pass Me By", a 1981 disco song by Cloud One. The song was first written with Buxton singing the lyrics "I used to be your Romeo".

The song was used in many independent and mainstream soundtracks. The song was also featured on the PlayStation game series SingStar. The song is available as a music video format on iTunes. Before the studio version was recorded and released, there was an acoustic version which was released on the duo's EP Xxtra Cutz (2001), which also featured the B-sides to the single's release.

Another version of "Romeo" was recorded at the BBC Radio 1's Live Lounge. This acoustic version was featured on the group's single "Where's Your Head At", as a bonus remix. The B-side track of the single, "Bongoloid", is a speed garage song featuring voices of two 11-year-old boys from Streatham who pitched up at their record label Atlantic Jaxx after looking them up in Yellow Pages. In 2018, the House & Garage Orchestra together with Le Roc recorded an orchestral version of the song for the UK garage covers album Garage Classics.

== Critical reception ==
"Romeo" was acclaimed by many music critics. John Bush from AllMusic highlighted the song as an album highlight, as he had said "'Romeo' is groovy and luscious enough to be the next single from Destiny's Child." David Browne from Entertainment Weekly had complimented the track as he agreed liking its "old school disco" music. Lou Thomas from BBC Music said "'Romeo' is still a bittersweet pop classic and will break your heart or make you dance in one frantic twitch." NME gave it a very positive and achievable review, saying "'Romeo' is a fantastic single from a good album, 'Rooty'; a frisky slip of spicy feminine pop perfectly tailored for maximum radio rotation." They also finished "Never complacent and always striving to be inventive, if it feels good, the Jaxx say, do it." Andy Herman from Popmatters referred the song as a "signature Jaxx dancefloor anthem." He also said "complete with a sassy disco-diva vocal, cornball lyrics, and cheesy new wave synths and background vocals that quickly establish the duo's obsession with retro kitsch." MusicOMH also described the song as "terrific" and a "summer hit." Rolling Stone described the song as "synthetic but warm hit."

Malcolm Seymour from Pitchfork was the dissenting critical voice; he gave it a mixed review. He said "the creepily Janet-esque "Romeo" commences the program on a bitter note. Featured diva Kele Le Roc's mindless lyrics spill over the predictable, shallow melodies, bland beats and clichéd basslines." Pitchfork later listed the song at number 50 on their Top 500 Tracks of the 2000s. Stylus Magazine listed the song at number 47 on their Top Singles of the Decade. As an album review, Stylus said "'Romeo' is vindicated in a glorious Bollywood-esque example of pop music." But as a ranking review, they had described it as "joyful", "bouncy", "cheerful" and "catchy." Sal Cinquemani from Slant Magazine had listed the song at number 116 on their Rest of the Best of the Aughts Top 500.

== Chart performance ==
"Romeo" debuted at number six on the UK Singles Chart, becoming the group's third top 10 hit in their native country. It also topped the UK Dance and UK Indie charts. At the end of 2001, it was ranked at number 98 on the UK year-end chart. In Ireland, the single peaked at number 17 on the Irish Singles Chart. The song was released in North America, where it peaked at number five on the US Billboard Hot Dance Club Play chart and number 10 on the Canadian Singles Chart.

The song additionally experienced success in mainland Europe and New Zealand. In the latter region, it debuted at number 41 on the New Zealand Singles Chart, then rose to number nine eight weeks later, staying in the charts for 14 weeks in total. It also reached the top 10 in Norway, debuting and peaking at number nine on the Norwegian Singles Chart; however, the song had less success in other European countries. It peaked at number 74 in France and number 82 in the Netherlands, but it did manage to reach the top 50 in Sweden—peaking at number 41—and the top 20 in Denmark—peaking at number 20.

== Music video ==
The music video is a tribute to old 1960s and 1970s Indian Bollywood films. The music video begins by showing a billboard that reads "Music by Basement Jaxx ROMEO Bollywood Blockbuster" and a traditional Bollywood movie poster of 'Romeo' featuring the video's main characters. The video then tells the story, showing Indian actress Divya Dutta in various settings wearing a sari. When the verse starts, she and a group of women dance to the song in a Bollywood style. It also shows her with a man that she loves, and another man who loves her as well. They get in a car and drive away, and she is later shown at home crying because of him. The two men fight for her love, a car chase follows with one eventually being the victor, and at the end, a group including her and her lover dance in front of an Indian temple against a backdrop of fountains, flowers and fireworks. It ends with her and her lover watching a sunset. In the music video, the actors perform different genres of dances, from traditional Indian dances to more pop culture styles.

== Track listings ==
UK CD single

1. "Romeo" (radio edit)
2. "Bongoloid"

UK 12-inch single

A1. "Romeo" (full length)
A2. "Camberwell Skies" (demo mix)
B1. "Bongoloid"

Australian CD single

1. "Romeo" (radio edit)
2. "Bongoloid"
3. "Camberwell Skies" (demo mix)

US maxi CD

1. "Romeo" (radio edit)
2. "Bongoloid"
3. "Camberwell Skies" (demo mix)
4. "Romeo" (club mix)
5. "Romeo" (beats mix)

== Charts ==
=== Weekly charts ===
Weekly chart performance for "Romeo"
Chart (2001)	Peak position
Australia (ARIA)	82
Belgium (Ultratop 50 Flanders)	31
Belgium (Ultratip Bubbling Under Wallonia)	6
Canada (Nielsen SoundScan)	10
Denmark (Tracklisten)	20
Europe (Eurochart Hot 100)	23
France (SNEP)	74
Ireland (IRMA)	17
Ireland Dance (IRMA)	2
Netherlands (Single Top 100)	82
New Zealand (Recorded Music NZ)	9
Norway (VG-lista)	9
Scottish Singles Sales (Official Charts)	6
Sweden (Sverigetopplistan)	41
UK Singles (Official Charts)	6
UK Dance (Official Charts)	1
UK Indie (Official Charts)	1
US Dance Club Songs (Billboard)	5

=== Year-end charts ===
Year-end chart performance for "Romeo"
Chart (2001)	Position
Canada (Nielsen SoundScan)	97
UK Singles (OCC)	98

== Certifications ==
Certifications for "Romeo"
Region	Certification	Certified units/sales
United Kingdom (BPI)	Gold	400,000^{‡}
^{‡} Sales+streaming figures based on certification alone.

== Release history ==
Release history and formats for "Romeo"
Region	Date	Format(s)	Label(s)	Ref(s).
United Kingdom	4 June 2001	12-inch vinyl; CD; cassette	XL	
Australia	4 June 2001	Vinyl; CD	XL; Remote Control	
