= List of Billboard number-one dance songs of 2020 =

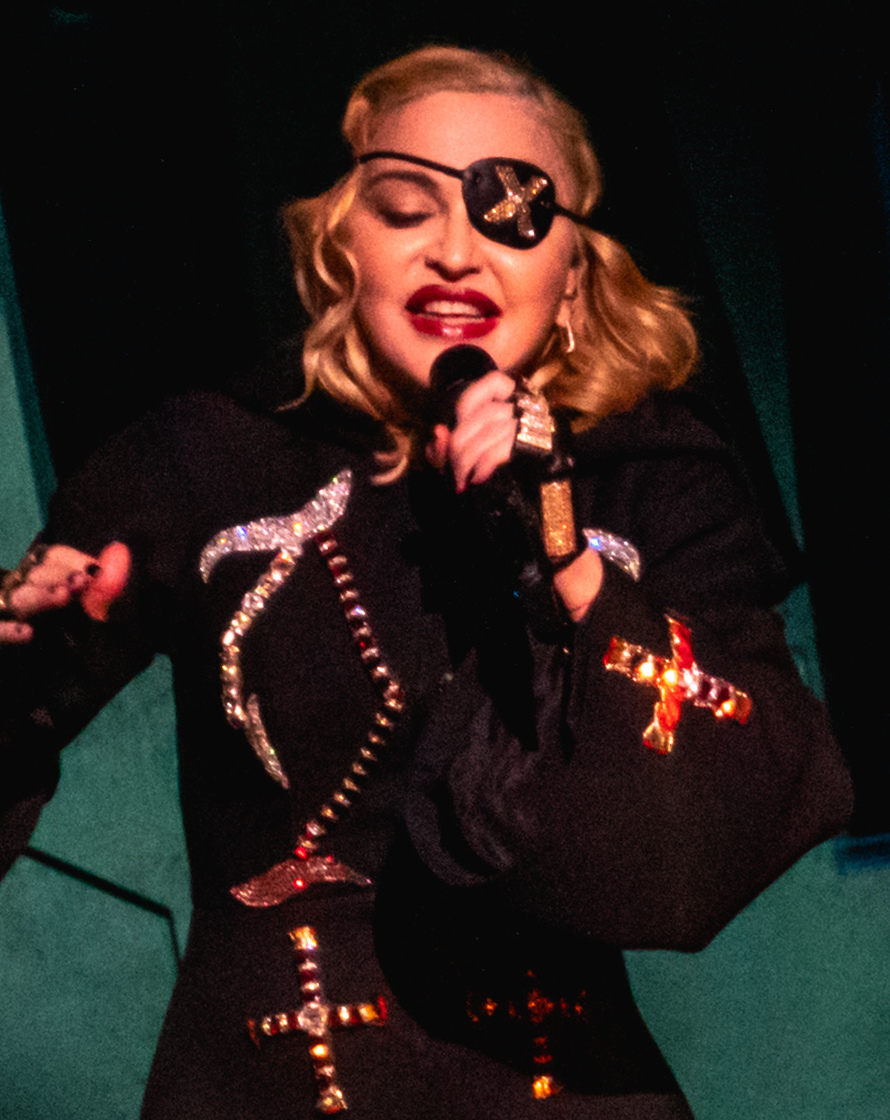
Madonna scored her 50th chart-topper with "I Don't Search I Find", extending her record for most number ones on the chart.

Billboard magazine compiled the top-performing dance songs in the United States during 2020 on the Hot Dance/Electronic Songs, the Dance Club Songs, and the Dance/Mix Show Airplay. The oldest dance music chart, the Dance Club Songs was first published in 1976, ranking the most popular songs on dance club based on reports from a national sample of club DJs. The Dance/Mix Show Airplay was launched in 2003, ranking songs based on airplay detections on dance radio, as well as mix-show plays on top 40 radio and select rhythmic radio as measured by Mediabase. Premiered on January 26, 2013, the Hot Dance/Electronic Songs is a multi-metric chart ranking songs based on streaming, sales, and airplay audience impressions from radio stations of all formats. The magazine suspended publication of the Dance Club Songs chart after the issue dated March 28 due to the COVID-19 pandemic causing nightclubs to close.

In the issue of Billboard dated January 4, British singer Dua Lipa climbed four places to number one with "Don't Start Now". The song spent a second week in the top spot in the next issue, the only track to spend more than a single week at number one in 2020. In February, Madonna achieved her fiftieth Dance Club Songs number one with "I Don't Search I Find", further increasing her records for both the highest number of chart-toppers on the listing and the greatest number of number ones on any individual Billboard chart. The singer also became the first artist to top the Club Songs list in five different decades, having first reached the top spot in 1983.

Several artists topped the chart for the first time in 2020, including producer Riton and singer Vula, whose appearances alongside producer Oliver Heldens on the track "Turn Me On" gave both artists a chart-topper with the first song of their respective careers to enter the chart. The final number one before the Dance Club Songs chart was suspended was "Love Hangover 2020" by Diana Ross, a remix of a song from 1976. At the time of the track's original release, Billboard published only city-specific club play charts, but rival publication Record World published a national chart and "Love Hangover" topped this listing. Several days after "Love Hangover 2020" reached the peak position, Billboard announced the decision to suspend the Dance Club Songs listing, stating that it would return at a date to be determined. As of January 2024, the chart remains suspended.

== Chart history ==
Key
†	Indicates top-performing dance song of 2020.

Chart history
Issue date	Hot Dance/Electronic Songs			Dance Club Songs			Dance/Mix Show Airplay		
Issue date	Song	Artist(s)	Ref.	Song	Artist(s)	Ref.	Song	Artist(s)	Ref.
January 4	"Happier"	Marshmello and Bastille		"Don't Start Now"	Dua Lipa		"Don't Start Now"†	Dua Lipa	
January 11	"Happier"	Marshmello and Bastille		"Don't Start Now"	Dua Lipa		"Don't Start Now"†	Dua Lipa	
January 18	"Happier"	Marshmello and Bastille		"Turn Me On"	Riton and Oliver Heldens featuring Vula		"Don't Start Now"†	Dua Lipa	
January 25	"Ritmo (Bad Boys for Life)"	The Black Eyed Peas and J Balvin		"I Feel Love"	Sam Smith		"Don't Start Now"†	Dua Lipa	
February 1	"Ritmo (Bad Boys for Life)"	The Black Eyed Peas and J Balvin		"Graveyard"	Halsey		"Don't Start Now"†	Dua Lipa	
February 8	"Ritmo (Bad Boys for Life)"	The Black Eyed Peas and J Balvin		"Rabbit Hole"	CamelPhat featuring Jem Cooke		"Don't Start Now"†	Dua Lipa	
February 15	"Ritmo (Bad Boys for Life)"	The Black Eyed Peas and J Balvin		"In the Dark"	Vintage Culture, Fancy Inc.		"Don't Start Now"†	Dua Lipa	
February 22	"Ritmo (Bad Boys for Life)"	The Black Eyed Peas and J Balvin		"I Don't Search I Find"	Madonna		"Don't Start Now"†	Dua Lipa	
February 29	"Ritmo (Bad Boys for Life)"	The Black Eyed Peas and J Balvin		"Baila Conmigo"	Jennifer Lopez		"Don't Start Now"†	Dua Lipa	
March 7	"Ritmo (Bad Boys for Life)"	The Black Eyed Peas and J Balvin		"All Night Long"	Jonas Blue and RetroVision		"Don't Start Now"†	Dua Lipa	
March 14	"Stupid Love"	Lady Gaga		"Sad"	Chico Rose featuring Afrojack		"Don't Start Now"†	Dua Lipa	
March 21	"Stupid Love"	Lady Gaga		"Therapy"	Duke Dumont		"Don't Start Now"†	Dua Lipa	
March 28	"Stupid Love"	Lady Gaga		"Love Hangover 2020"	Diana Ross		"Don't Start Now"†	Dua Lipa	
April 4	"Ritmo (Bad Boys for Life)"	The Black Eyed Peas and J Balvin		Defunct			"Don't Start Now"†	Dua Lipa	
April 11	"Ritmo (Bad Boys for Life)"	The Black Eyed Peas and J Balvin		Defunct			"Don't Start Now"†	Dua Lipa	
April 18	"Ritmo (Bad Boys for Life)"	The Black Eyed Peas and J Balvin		Defunct			"Greenlights"	Krewella	
April 25	"Roses"†	Saint Jhn		Defunct			"Say So"	Doja Cat featuring Nicki Minaj	
May 2	"Roses"†	Saint Jhn		Defunct			"Say So"	Doja Cat featuring Nicki Minaj	
May 9	"Roses"†	Saint Jhn		Defunct			"Say So"	Doja Cat featuring Nicki Minaj	
May 16	"Roses"†	Saint Jhn		Defunct			"Say So"	Doja Cat featuring Nicki Minaj	
May 23	"Roses"†	Saint Jhn		Defunct			"Say So"	Doja Cat featuring Nicki Minaj	
May 30	"Roses"†	Saint Jhn		Defunct			"Say So"	Doja Cat featuring Nicki Minaj	
June 6	"Rain on Me"	Lady Gaga and Ariana Grande		Defunct			"Say So"	Doja Cat featuring Nicki Minaj	
June 13	"Rain on Me"	Lady Gaga and Ariana Grande		Defunct			"Say So"	Doja Cat featuring Nicki Minaj	
June 20	"Roses"†	Saint Jhn		Defunct			"Say So"	Doja Cat featuring Nicki Minaj	
June 27	"Roses"†	Saint Jhn		Defunct			"Say So"	Doja Cat featuring Nicki Minaj	
July 4	"Roses"†	Saint Jhn		Defunct			"Say So"	Doja Cat featuring Nicki Minaj	
July 11	"Roses"†	Saint Jhn		Defunct			"Say So"	Doja Cat featuring Nicki Minaj	
July 18	"Roses"†	Saint Jhn		Defunct			"Rain on Me"	Lady Gaga and Ariana Grande	
July 25	"Roses"†	Saint Jhn		Defunct			"Rain on Me"	Lady Gaga and Ariana Grande	
August 1	"Roses"†	Saint Jhn		Defunct			"Rain on Me"	Lady Gaga and Ariana Grande	
August 8	"Roses"†	Saint Jhn		Defunct			"Rain on Me"	Lady Gaga and Ariana Grande	
August 15	"Roses"†	Saint Jhn		Defunct			"Higher Ground"	Martin Garrix featuring John Martin	
August 22	"Roses"†	Saint Jhn		Defunct			"Lay Your Head on Me"	Major Lazer featuring Marcus Mumford	
August 29	"Roses"†	Saint Jhn		Defunct			"Head & Heart"	Joel Corry featuring MNEK	
September 5	"Roses"†	Saint Jhn		Defunct			"Head & Heart"	Joel Corry featuring MNEK	
September 12	"Roses"†	Saint Jhn		Defunct			"Head & Heart"	Joel Corry featuring MNEK	
September 19	"Roses"†	Saint Jhn		Defunct			"Head & Heart"	Joel Corry featuring MNEK	
September 26	"Roses"†	Saint Jhn		Defunct			"Head & Heart"	Joel Corry featuring MNEK	
October 3	"Roses"†	Saint Jhn		Defunct			"Head & Heart"	Joel Corry featuring MNEK	
October 10	"ily (i love you baby)"	Surf Mesa featuring Emilee		Defunct			"Head & Heart"	Joel Corry featuring MNEK	
October 17	"Roses"†	Saint Jhn		Defunct			"Head & Heart"	Joel Corry featuring MNEK	
October 24	"ily (i love you baby)"	Surf Mesa featuring Emilee		Defunct			"Head & Heart"	Joel Corry featuring MNEK	
October 31	"ily (i love you baby)"	Surf Mesa featuring Emilee		Defunct			"Picture Us"	Anabel Englund	
November 7	"ily (i love you baby)"	Surf Mesa featuring Emilee		Defunct			"Nightlight"	Illenium	
November 14	"ily (i love you baby)"	Surf Mesa featuring Emilee		Defunct			"Let's Love"	David Guetta and Sia	
November 21	"ily (i love you baby)"	Surf Mesa featuring Emilee		Defunct			"Craving"	Arty, Audien and Ellee Duke	
November 28	"ily (i love you baby)"	Surf Mesa featuring Emilee		Defunct			"The Business"	Tiësto	
December 5	"ily (i love you baby)"	Surf Mesa featuring Emilee		Defunct			"Lasting Lover"	Sigala & James Arthur	
December 12	"ily (i love you baby)"	Surf Mesa featuring Emilee		Defunct			"Lasting Lover"	Sigala & James Arthur	
December 19	"ily (i love you baby)"	Surf Mesa featuring Emilee		Defunct			"Diamonds"	Sam Smith	
December 26	"ily (i love you baby)"	Surf Mesa featuring Emilee		Defunct			"You Broke Me First"	Tate McRae	

== See also ==
- 2020 in American music
- Impact of the COVID-19 pandemic on the music industry
- List of Billboard Hot 100 number ones of 2020
