= Bingo Bango =

2000 single by Basement Jaxx

Single by Basement Jaxx

from the album Remedy
- Released: 27 March 2000
- Genre: Latin house
- Length: 5:58 (album version); 3:45 (radio mix)
- Label: XL
- Songwriters: Felix Buxton; Simon Radcliffe; Jose Ibata; Rolando Ibata
- Producer: Basement Jaxx

Basement Jaxx singles chronology
"Jump n' Shout" (1999)	"Bingo Bango" (2000)	"Star" / "Buddy" (2000)

Music video
- "Bingo Bango" on YouTube

"Bingo Bango" is a song written and recorded by English electronic music duo Basement Jaxx for their debut album, Remedy (1999). The track, which contains a sample of Bolivar's "Merengue" and as a result, Jose Ibata and Rolando Ibata are credited as songwriters, combined dance music with various elements of Latin music. It was released by XL Recordings as the album's fourth single on 27 March 2000, and later became the duo's third No. 1 song on the Billboard Dance Club Play chart. The song also peaked at No. 6 in Iceland and No. 13 in the United Kingdom.

In other media, "Bingo Bango" appeared in television shows and films, such as the American version of Queer as Folk, The Dancer (2000), and various televised sports events. A 2012 cover version by American Hot 8 Brass Band received positive reception. In 2011, Basement Jaxx's Felix Buxton and musician Jules Buckley created an orchestral version of the song and included it in the live album Basement Jaxx vs. Metropole Orkest.

== Production ==
"Bingo Bango" is a four-to-the-floor dance song that was primarily influenced by Latin music. It contains elements of samba, calypso, house, and techno, and was said by Barry Walters of Rolling Stone to also "layer ska on top of salsa." AllMusic's John Bush noticed the use of horns throughout the production, which Michaelangelo Matos described in The Rolling Stone Album Guide as "carnival-bound horn blasts." Bush additionally wrote that, similar to "Rendez-Vu", "Bingo Bango" was another Remedy (1999) track that shared "the Nuyoricans' penchant for Latin vibes." A sample of Bolivar's "Merengue" also appeared in the song.

In 2011, Felix Buxton collaborated with musician Jules Buckley to re-arrange fifteen of Basement Jaxx's tracks for a live orchestral show. "We made it into a Viennese Waltz for the simplest reason: why the hell not?," Jules stated. Andy Gill of The Independent wrote that this new version was based around waltz-time harpsichord and "raffishly muted" trumpet.

== Critical and commercial reception ==
Matt Hendrickson from Rolling Stone called "Bingo Bango" an "a calypso romp," while Alice Fisher of The Observer described it as "riotous". In a review for MetroActive, Michelle Goldberg praised the song's "brilliant melding" between the different genres. She claimed it was done with a "gleeful naturalness so that the foreign sounds never sound like superfluous spice." On the other hand, British music magazine NME was extremely negative, stating:

"Bingo Bango", is no less irritating [than the other Remedy tracks], though less brutish in its execution and more like the bothersome exhortations of an over-exuberant toddler; the vocal sample is ‘nagging’ like a grandmother disapproving of a new haircut and ‘catchy’ in that same ghastly way that any advert with Michael Winner in is memorable – just because it sticks in the head doesn't make it good.

The orchestral rendition received a favorable review from The Independent's Andy Gill, who labelled it a "delicate, sugarplum-fairy re-imagining." He further wrote: "[The re-arrangement] becomes as unashamedly widescreen as a Spielberg film score by John Williams, speeding up as it goes along like a Greek or Cossack dance – just one benefit of its being freed from sequencer rhythms."

Commercially, "Bingo Bango" achieved moderate success. On 29 July 2000, the song topped the Billboard Dance Club Play chart and stayed there for two consecutive weeks. It was the duo's third No. 1 on the chart, following "Red Alert" and "Rendez-Vu", both in 1999. "Bingo Bango" later peaked at No. 7 on its year-end edition of 2000. It also peaked at No. 13 in the United Kingdom and No. 99 in Netherlands. In 2004, MTV Dance ranked the song at No. 65 in their Top 100 Ibiza Anthems list. The results were voted by various industrial disc jockeys and artists.

== Promotion and other usages ==
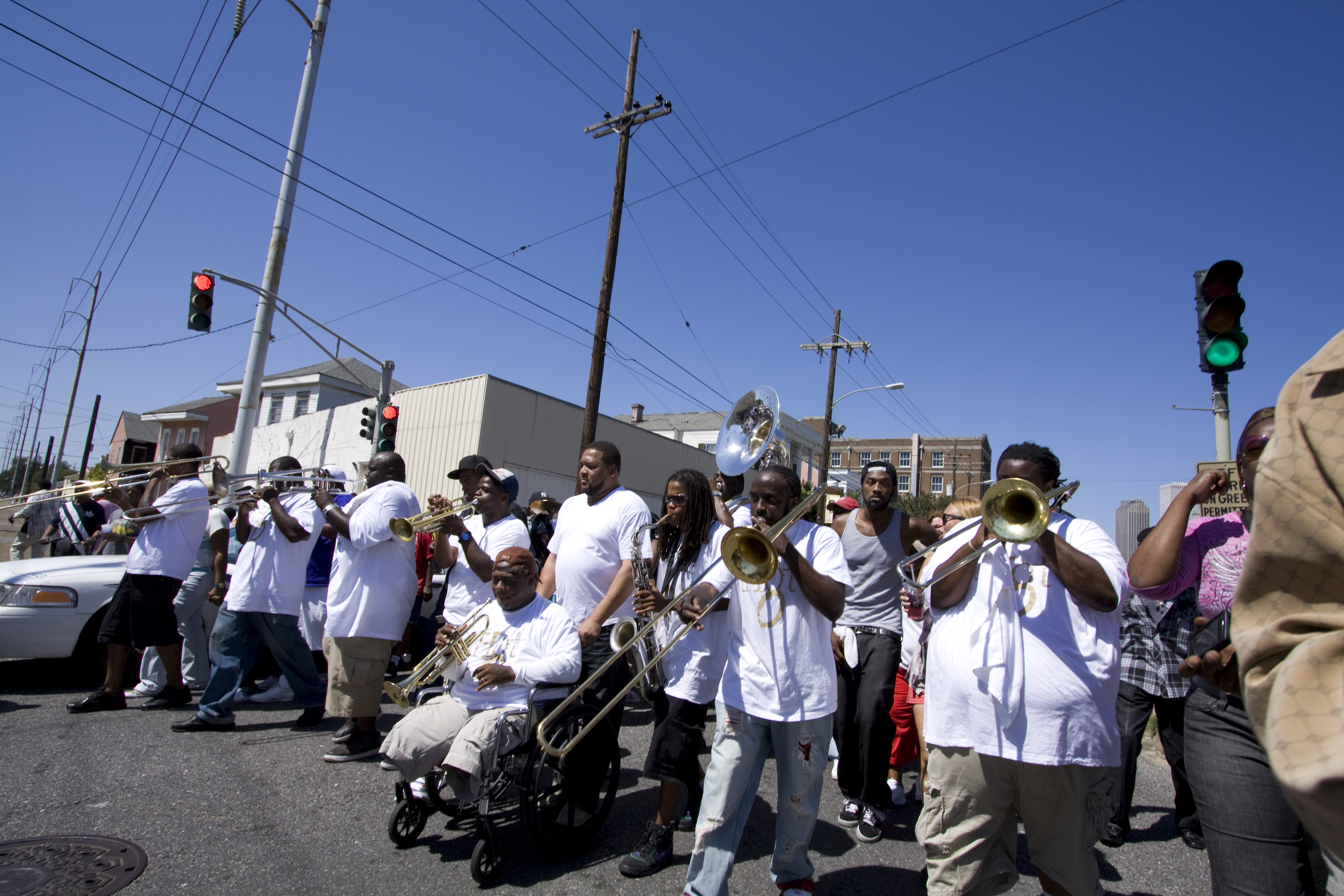
Hot 8 Brass Band (pictured) recorded a cover rendition of the song and met with a positive reaction

Basement Jaxx directed a music video for "Bingo Bango" and included it on their video compilation The Videos (2005). The song also appeared in their 1999 Essential Mix of the Year-winning DJ mix, broadcast on BBC Radio 1 in May, and on their greatest hits album, The Singles (2005).

On Hot 8 Brass Band's second studio album, The Life & Times Of... (2012), the band's cover of the song was highly acclaimed by AllMusic's Al Campbell. Campbell said: "In the context of brass band music, ["Bingo Bango" is not a track] that would immediately come to mind as complementing that style. But in the hands of the Hot 8, not only do they make it work, it coheres entirely throughout the disc." Neil Spencer from The Observer wrote that their cover brought the Latin "flavors" to the song.

On television, "Bingo Bango" was used in the second episode of series two of At Home with the Braithwaites, which aired on 11 January 2001. American show Queer as Folk featured the song twice during its first season. The original version appeared in "No Bris, No Shirt, No Service", which aired on 10 December 2000; while the "Latin Mix" appeared in "Full Circle", which aired on 24 June 2001. On 7 June 2005, the song appeared during the first episode of Sugar Rush.

Theatrically, French drama The Dancer (2000), American teen comedy Get Over It (2001) and the action thriller Extreme Ops (2002) all featured the track. The first two films also included it in their soundtrack albums. "Bingo Bango" was a downloadable game feature on DanceStar Digital in 2013. In 2001, both The Guardian and The Independent observed that the track frequently accompanied many televised sports events and commercials. Buxton told the latter publication: "I saw a bit of football yesterday and as usual they were playing 'Bingo Bango' alongside the commentary. I thought how much it suits it – it was very energetic. I felt very proud."

Basement Jaxx usually ended their live performances with "Bingo Bango". For their set at Creamfields festival in 2000, they brought on stage a "dazzling troupe of feathered Mardi Gras dancers" during the song. In 2011, Jules Buckley and Metropole Orkest, which consists of a 60-piece orchestra and a 20-voice choir, performed the Buxton-written orchestral version in three shows in the Netherlands and United Kingdom. Recordings of the Netherlands' concert later became the material for the duo's first live album, Basement Jaxx vs. Metropole Orkest (2011).

== Formats and track listings ==
Australian maxi-CD single

1. "Red Alert" (Radio Mix) – 3:36
2. "Bingo Bango" (Radio Mix) – 3:45
3. "Red Alert" (Extended Mix) – 6:21
4. "Bingo Bango" (Extended Mix) – 7:26
5. "Bingo Bango" (Choo Choo's Apple Jaxx Mix) – 7:01

European CD single

1. "Bingo Bango" (Radio Mix) – 3:45
2. "Bingo Bango" (Original Mix) – 7:26

European and UK maxi-CD; Italian and UK 12-inch single

1. "Bingo Bango" (Radio Mix) – 3:45
2. "Bingo Bango" (Choo Choo's Apple Jaxx Mix) – 7:01
3. "Jump 'n Shout" (Stanton Warriors Mixx) – 5:46

UK 12-inch single

1. "Bingo Bango" (Original Mix) – 7:26
2. "Bingo Bango" (Choo Choo's Apple Jaxx Mix) – 6:30
3. "Jump 'n Shout" (Stanton Warriors Mixx) – 5:46

UK cassette single

1. "Bingo Bango" (Radio Mix) – 3:45
2. "Bingo Bango" (Choo Choo's Apple Jaxx Mix) – 7:01
3. "Bingo Bango" (DJ Funk Mix) – 6:05

US 12-inch single

1. "Bingo Bango" (Latin Bango Mix) – 8:30
2. "Bingo Bango" (Altered Face Mix) – 8:01
3. "Bingo Bango" (Latin Dub Mix) – 7:48
4. "Bingo Bango" (DJ Funk Mix) – 6:00
5. "Bingo Bango" (Morales' Bango Beats) – 7:36
6. "Bingo Bango" (LP Version) – 5:56
7. "Bingo Bango" (Latin Bango Radio Edit) – 3:49
8. "Bingo Bango" (DJ Funk Radio Edit) – 3:06

== Credits ==
Credits adapted from the liner notes of Remedy and The Singles.

Recording and management

- Mastered by Mike Marsh at The Exchange.
- Published by Universal Music (formerly MCA Music)/Bryunny Publishing.
- Contains a sample of "Merengue" of Bolivar courtesy of Acid Jazz Records.

Personnel

- Felix Buxton – mixing, production, songwriting
- Simon Ratcliffe – mixing, production, songwriting
- Jose Ibata – songwriting
- Rolando Ibata – songwriting
- Ugo Delmirani – keyboard solo
- Cassie Watson – main vocal
- Jorges – word bitz
- Nyna – word bitz

== Charts ==
=== Weekly charts ===
Chart (2000)	Peak position
Canada Dance/Urban (RPM)	4
Iceland (Íslenski Listinn Topp 40)	6
Netherlands (Single Top 100)	99
Scottish Singles Sales (Official Charts)	23
UK Singles (Official Charts)	13
UK Dance (Official Charts)	2
UK Indie (Official Charts)	4
US Dance Club Songs (Billboard)	1

=== Year-end charts ===
Chart (2000)	Position
US Dance Club Play (Billboard)	7
