= Turn Me On (Riton and Oliver Heldens song) =

2019 single by Riton and Oliver Heldens featuring Vula

Single by Riton and Oliver Heldens featuring Vula
- Released: 13 September 2019
- Genre: Dance-pop; nu-disco
- Length: 3:28
- Label: Ministry of Sound
- Songwriters: Henry Smithson; Olivier Heldens; Allan Wayne Felder; Iman Contahulten; Norman Ray Harris; Ronald Tyson; Vince Clarke
- Producers: Oliver Heldens; Riton; Hal Ritson (voc.)

Riton singles chronology
"Dangerous" (2018)	"Turn Me On" (2019)	"Mr Todd Terry" (2019)

Oliver Heldens singles chronology
"Cucumba" (2019)	"Turn Me On" (2019)	"Lift Me Up" (2019)

Music video
- "Turn Me On" on YouTube

"Turn Me On" is a song by English DJ Riton and Dutch producer Oliver Heldens featuring English-American singer Vula. It was released on 13 September 2019 through Ministry of Sound Recordings. The drop fully incorporates the main melody from Yazoo's 1982 classic "Don't Go" while some of the lyrics reference 1977 song "Doctor Love" by American band First Choice. Marshall Jefferson released a remix of the song on 1 November 2019, which was well received by the two lead artists of the track. The single reached number one on Billboard's Dance/Mix Show Airplay Chart in November 2019, allowing Riton, Heldens, and Vula to each top that chart for the first time.

== Background ==
During an interview for Official Charts Company, the two lead artists unveiled the genesis of the song. Riton said he had for the first time the idea to remix a Yazoo song when he watched YouTube videos about their producer, Vince Clarke. He decided to send him the demo of Doctor Love/Turn Me On where he was into it. Then, he teamed with him and finished the work with Oliver Heldens. He later said to Billboard, "I always wanted to be the Alison Moyet to Vince Clarke in Yazoo. The lovely chap has let me sample his smash hit 'Don't Go'. I'm honoured. Thank you to the big man." Oliver Heldens said to Digital Journal that he followed Riton's idea to remix the track. He also complimented the project and Vula's vocals.

== Critical reception ==
The song received positive criticism from multiple publications. Gaëtan Audeyer of French radio Virgin described the track as very danceable. Kat Bein of Billboard noted the number as "a retro club banger that'll put any modern dance fan in a futuristic fever". John Cameron of EDM.com deemed it "an infectious nightclub heater" with "an anthemic vocal [from Vula] that gives a song the sort of appeal that extends beyond the dance floor". BroadwayWorld TV News Desk called the single "an infectious slice of feel good house" which delivers "a masterfully modern take on the 1982 Yazoo classic 'Don't Go' - channelling a feelgood, club-ready revamp". Writing for German public broadcasting institution Westdeutscher Rundfunk, Daniel Vogrin noted Vula's voice as strong. Indeed, he added that she was featured in the gospel choir of Sam Smith's "Pray" and she is one of the main voices of London Community Gospel Choir. Ramona of German online platform of song lyrics Songtexte.com wrote that "the ingenious song makes for a perfect mix of retro and dance vibes", endowed with "an unmistakable melody" which perfectly makes "the connection to the original song".

== Music video ==
A lyric video was first posted on 12 September 2019 through Oliver Heldens' YouTube channel. Then, the official music video, directed by Elliot Simpson, was released on 9 October 2019. The artists later stated that the video was influenced by Ministry of Sound music videos from the 2000s, like those made by Eric Prydz or Benny Benassi. The video depicts an out of control Dr Frankenstein character, Dr Love, played by actor and model Bernardo de La Rocque hell bent on injecting love into the lives of his patients by whatever means.

== Track listing ==
Digital download
No.	Title	Length
1.	"Turn Me On" (featuring Vula)	3:28

Digital download – Marshall Jefferson Anthem Mix
No.	Title	Length
1.	"Turn Me On" (featuring Vula) (Marshall Jefferson Anthem Mix)	3:28

Digital download – Acoustic Version
No.	Title	Length
1.	"Turn Me On" (featuring Vula) (Acoustic Version)	3:37

== Credits and personnel ==
Credits adapted from Tidal.

- Oliver Heldens – production, composition, lyrics
- Riton – production, composition, lyrics
- Allan Wayne Felder – composition, lyrics
- Iman Contahulten – composition, lyrics
- Norman Ray Harris – composition, lyrics
- Ronald Tyson – composition, lyrics
- Vince Clarke – composition, lyrics
- Mike Marsh – master engineering
- Serge Courtois – mix engineering
- Dipesh Parmar – programming
- Vula Malinga – vocals
- Hal Ritson – vocal production, vocals, record engineering

== Charts ==
=== Weekly charts ===
Chart (2019–2020)	Peak position
Australia (ARIA)	38
Austria (Ö3 Austria Top 40)	58
Belgium (Ultratop 50 Flanders)	12
Belgium (Ultratop 50 Wallonia)	13
Croatia International Airplay (Top lista)	20
Czech Republic Airplay (ČNS IFPI)	7
Czech Republic Singles Digital (ČNS IFPI)	74
Euro Digital Song Sales (Billboard)	6
France (SNEP)	84
Germany (GfK)	18
Hungary (Dance Top 40)	10
Hungary (Rádiós Top 40)	1
Hungary (Single Top 40)	9
Hungary (Stream Top 40)	35
Ireland (IRMA)	11
Lithuania (AGATA)	55
Luxembourg Digital Song Sales (Billboard)	5
Mexico Airplay (Billboard)	30
Netherlands (Dutch Top 40)	22
Netherlands (Single Top 100)	38
Romania (Airplay 100)	89
Scotland Singles (OCC)	5
Serbia Airplay (Radiomonitor)	3
Slovakia Airplay (ČNS IFPI)	2
Slovakia Singles Digital (ČNS IFPI)	47
Slovenia (SloTop50)	27
Switzerland (Schweizer Hitparade)	38
UK Singles (OCC)	12
UK Dance (OCC)	2
US Bubbling Under Hot 100 (Billboard)	21
US Dance Club Songs (Billboard)	1
US Hot Dance/Electronic Songs (Billboard)	11

=== Monthly charts ===
Monthly chart performance for "Turn Me On"
Chart (2019)	Peak position
Latvia Airplay (LaIPA)	9

=== Year-end charts ===
Chart (2019)	Position
Netherlands (Dutch Top 40)	97
Chart (2020)	Position
Belgium (Ultratop Flanders)	49
Belgium (Ultratop Wallonia)	35
Germany (Official German Charts)	72
Hungary (Dance Top 40)	24
Hungary (Rádiós Top 40)	1
Hungary (Single Top 40)	68
US Hot Dance/Electronic Songs (Billboard)	45

== Certifications ==
Region	Certification	Certified units/sales
Australia (ARIA)	Platinum	70,000^{‡}
Austria (IFPI Austria)	Platinum	30,000^{‡}
Belgium (BRMA)	Gold	20,000^{‡}
Denmark (IFPI Danmark)	Gold	45,000^{‡}
France (SNEP)	Platinum	200,000^{‡}
Germany (BVMI)	Platinum	400,000^{‡}
Italy (FIMI)	Gold	35,000^{‡}
New Zealand (RMNZ)	Gold	15,000^{‡}
Poland (ZPAV)	Gold	10,000^{‡}
Spain (Promusicae)	Gold	30,000^{‡}
Switzerland (IFPI Switzerland)	Gold	10,000^{‡}
United Kingdom (BPI)	Platinum	600,000^{‡}
^{‡} Sales+streaming figures based on certification alone.

== See also ==
- List of Billboard number-one dance songs of 2020
