= Oh My Gosh (Basement Jaxx song) =

2005 single by Basement Jaxx

Single by Basement Jaxx

from the album The Singles
- B-side: "Oh My Dub"
- Released: 14 March 2005
- Genre: House
- Length: 3:58
- Label: XL; Remote Control
- Songwriters: Simon Ratcliffe; Felix Buxton
- Producer: Basement Jaxx

Basement Jaxx singles chronology
"Plug It In" (2004)	"Oh My Gosh" (2005)	"U Don't Know Me" (2005)

Vula Malinga singles chronology
"Oh My Gosh" (2005)	"Hush Boy" (2006)

"Oh My Gosh" is a song by British electronic music duo Basement Jaxx. It was released on 14 March 2005 as the lead single from the band's greatest hits album, The Singles. Vula Malinga and rapper Skillah are two vocals contributor in the song.

The song achieved moderate success when it peaked at number eight in the UK Singles Chart and was also nominated for the Popjustice £20 Music Prize. Worldwide, "Oh My Gosh" reached number four in Finland and peaked within the top 40 in Australia, Flemish Belgium and Ireland.

== Background and composition ==
The duo sat down and wrote the song specifically as a single for the album. Ratcliffe personally felt encouraged by it; he thought it was a good way to ease them back into the songwriting process. They applied the same treatment to their later single "Hush Boy" but, however, failed.

== Critical reception ==
While reviewing The Singles, AllMusic's Andy Kellman listed the song as one of his "track picks" on the album and called the song "rubbery", "deliciously flirtatious and cartoonish." Writing for Drowned in Sound, Julian Ridgway gave the song 5 out of 10, stated: "They’ve proved themselves masters of the dumb pop single in the past – records that make you smile even if they don’t make you think. But with 'Oh My Gosh' the smile’s started to freeze over, like the one you get when people make you look through their holiday photos." He concluded his review by commented that the "airhead" lyrics are "quite funny" but the song "is pretty average stuff for them." In 2005, it was nominated for the Popjustice £20 Music Prize, but lost to "Wake Me Up" by Girls Aloud.

== Chart performance ==
On 26 March 2005 the song debuted at its highest position with number eight on the UK Singles Chart. Thanks to its digital downloading availability, the song charted at number 27 rather than number 45 on its fifth week in.

== Music video ==
The music video was directed by Mat Kirkby, who previously worked with Basement Jaxx on the video for "Good Luck". It is set in a retirement home and features elderly men and women singing about how they like each other whilst doing elderly activities. One of the dancers of the video was Deanne Berry, the dancer and fitness guru known for appearing in the music video for Eric Prydz's "Call on Me". In the video, she dressed as an old lady, which she thought was "pretty funny".

The video is the one of two comedic works from Kirkby, the other being his 2013 short film, The Phone Call. "There were some interesting similarities on the shoot – in comedy I'm usually sat behind a monitor, biting my hand/trying to stifle a laugh/keep quiet so that I don’t ruin the take," he said. "In both cases I find that zipping up your snorkel and pulling down your hat helps muffle the sound."

The video was awarded "Best Video" at the 2005 House Music Awards; Malinga was present at the ceremony to receive it.

== Track listings ==
UK CD1 and European CD single

1. "Oh My Gosh" (radio edit)
2. "Oh My Gosh" (Old Skool dub)

UK CD2

1. "Oh My Gosh" (Jaxx club edit)
2. "Oh My Gosh" (Kneedeep club mix)
3. "Oh My Gosh" (Bugz in the Attic remix)
4. "Oh My Dub"

UK 12-inch single

A1. "Oh My Gosh" (Jaxx club edit)
A2. "Oh My Gosh" (Bugz in the Attic remix)
B1. "Oh My Gosh" (Kneedeep club mix)

Australian and New Zealand maxi-CD single

1. "Oh My Gosh" (radio edit)
2. "Oh My Gosh" (Old Skool dub)
3. "Oh My Gosh" (Jaxx club edit)
4. "Oh My Gosh" (Kneedeep club mix)
5. "Oh My Gosh" (Bugz in the Attic remix)
6. "Oh My Dub"

== Charts ==
=== Weekly charts ===
Weekly chart performance for "Oh My Gosh"
Chart (2005)	Peak position
Australia (ARIA)	36
Australian Club Chart (ARIA)	2
Australian Dance (ARIA)	5
Belgium (Ultratop 50 Flanders)	40
Belgium (Ultratip Bubbling Under Wallonia)	13
Finland (Suomen virallinen lista)	4
Germany (GfK)	98
Ireland (IRMA)	23
Ireland Dance (IRMA)	2
Netherlands (Single Top 100)	91
Scotland Singles (Official Charts)	15
UK Singles (Official Charts)	8
UK Dance (Official Charts)	1
UK Indie (Official Charts)	1

=== Year-end charts ===
Year-end chart performance for "Oh My Gosh"
Chart (2005)	Position
Australian Club Chart (ARIA)	33
UK Singles (OCC)	114

== Release history ==
Release history and formats for "Oh My Gosh"
Region	Date	Format(s)	Label(s)	Ref.
Australia	14 March 2005	12-inch vinyl; CD	XL; Remote Control	
United Kingdom	14 March 2005	12-inch vinyl; CD	XL	
