= Do Your Thing (Basement Jaxx song) =

2003 single by Basement Jaxx

- UK cover

Single by Basement Jaxx

from the album Rooty
- Released: 24 February 2003
- Genre: Big band; jazz
- Length: 4:24
- Label: XL
- Songwriters: Simon Ratcliffe; Felix Buxton; Blue Mitchell
- Producer: Basement Jaxx

Basement Jaxx Australian singles chronology
"Get Me Off" (2002)	"Do Your Thing" (2003)	"Lucky Star" (2003)

Basement Jaxx UK singles chronology
"U Don't Know Me" (2005)	"Do Your Thing" (2005)	"Hush Boy" (2006)

"Do Your Thing" is a song by English electronic music duo Basement Jaxx. It originally appeared on their second studio album, Rooty (2001), and was released in Australia in February 2003, reaching number 33 on the ARIA Singles Chart. In the UK, it was released in September 2005, when it reached number 32 on the UK Singles Chart. The lead vocals are sung by Elliot May.

== Composition and video ==
The song samples the track "Fungii Mama" written by Blue Mitchell from Kenny Barron's album Lemuria-Seascape (1991). The song's music video was directed by Kim Gehrig, in her directorial debut, and features people in a park wearing shirts which mirror the song lyrics.

== Later interpretation ==
The song is included on the 2011 experimental live album Basement Jaxx vs. Metropole Orkest, for which it was recorded, at the Muziekcentrum van de Omroe in Hilversum, the Netherlands, on 3–5 November 2010, with a trumpet solo by Ruud Breuls.

Reviewing the album for The Independent, Andy Gill said: "'Do Your Thing' is very New York in flavour, a big-band jazz groove led by piano, the audience clapping along with the rattling percussion as brash trombones and sinuous saxophone take brief solos before the strings whip the piece to its conclusion."

== Charts ==
Chart (2003)	Peak position
Australia (ARIA)	33

Chart (2005)	Peak position
Scottish Singles Sales (Official Charts)	34
UK Singles (Official Charts)	32
UK Dance (Official Charts)	1
UK Indie (Official Charts)	6

== Certifications ==
Region	Certification	Certified units/sales
United Kingdom (BPI)	Silver	200,000^{‡}
^{‡} Sales+streaming figures based on certification alone.

== Release history ==
Region	Date	Format(s)	Label(s)	Ref.
Australia	24 February 2003	CD	Remote Control	
United Kingdom	26 September 2005	12-inch vinyl; CD	XL	
