= Jus 1 Kiss =

2001 single by Basement Jaxx

- Artwork for most releases. For UK CD2, the artwork's background is coloured blue.

Single by Basement Jaxx

from the album Rooty
- B-side: "Twilite"
- Released: 17 September 2001
- Genre: Disco
- Length: 4:24 (album version); 3:37 (radio edit)
- Label: XL
- Songwriters: Simon Ratcliffe; Felix Buxton; Nile Rodgers; Bernard Edwards
- Producer: Basement Jaxx

Basement Jaxx singles chronology
"Romeo" (2001)	"Jus 1 Kiss" (2001)	"Where's Your Head At" (2001)

"Jus 1 Kiss" is a song by English electronic dance music duo Basement Jaxx. It was released on 17 September 2001 by XL Recordings as the second single from their second studio album, Rooty (2001). It reached number 23 on the UK Singles Chart, number one on the UK Dance Chart, and was a minor hit in Australia and the Flanders region of Belgium.

== Reception ==
The Guardian wrote that "Jus 1 Kiss" is "intoxicating in its hands-in-the-air simplicity," while The Irish Times claimed that it demonstrates Basement Jaxx's "growing confidence." John Bush for AllMusic and Ed Potton for The Times described it as "filtered disco" and "breezy...and soaring", respectively, each complimenting the song as contributing to Rooty overall. In a retrospective for Rooty, DJ Mag referred to it as a "timeless pop single." On the other hand, a Spin review compared it negatively to Wings and called it "unsatisfying," while a Sunday Times review wrote that it was uninteresting.

== Track listings ==
UK CD1
No.	Title	Length
1.	"Jus 1 Kiss" (radio edit)	3:40
2.	"Jus 1 Kiss" (Jaxx Nite dub)	6:32
3.	"Twilite"	4:57
4.	"Jus 1 Kiss" (video)	4:41

UK CD2
No.	Title	Length
1.	"Jus 1 Kiss" (extended mix)	6:48
2.	"Jus 1 Kiss" (Sunship remix)	5:22
3.	"Jus 1 Kiss" (Boris Dlugosch and Michi Lange's BMR Digitised re-edit)	6:39

European and Australian CD single
No.	Title	Length
1.	"Jus 1 Kiss" (radio edit)	3:40
2.	"Jus 1 Kiss" (Jaxx Nite dub)	6:32
3.	"Twilite"	4:57
4.	"Jus 1 Kiss" (extended mix)	6:48
5.	"Jus 1 Kiss" (Sunship remix)	5:22
6.	"Jus 1 Kiss" (Boris Dlugosch and Michi Lange's BMR Digitised re-edit)	6:41
7.	"Jus 1 Kiss" (video)	4:41

== Charts ==
Chart (2001)	Peak position
Australia (ARIA)	88
Belgium (Ultratip Bubbling Under Flanders)	12
Europe (Eurochart Hot 100)	92
Ireland (IRMA)	45
Ireland Dance (IRMA)	7
Scotland Singles (OCC)	33
UK Singles (OCC)	23
UK Dance (OCC)	1
UK Indie (OCC)	6
