= Rooty =

Studio album by Basement Jaxx
- Released: 25 June 2001
- Genres: Dance; electronica; house
- Length: 42:43
- Labels: XL; Astralwerks
- Producers: Felix Buxton; Simon Ratcliffe

Basement Jaxx chronology
Remedy (1999)	Rooty (2001)	Kish Kash (2003)

Singles from Rooty
- 1. "Romeo" Released: 4 June 2001; 2. "Jus 1 Kiss" Released: 17 September 2001; 3. "Where's Your Head At" Released: 19 November 2001; 4. "Get Me Off" Released: 17 June 2002; 5. "Do Your Thing" Released: 24 February 2003

Rooty is the second studio album by English electronic music duo Basement Jaxx, released by XL in the UK and Astralwerks in the US on 25 June 2001.

Like its predecessor Remedy, Rooty was well-received critically and commercially. Five singles were released from the album: "Romeo", "Jus 1 Kiss", "Where's Your Head At", "Get Me Off" and the Australia-only single "Do Your Thing".

== Background ==
=== Concept and artwork ===
The name of the album is taken from Basement Jaxx's regular club event called "Rooty", held at a small bar in Brixton. The cover art featured Snowflake, the world's only known albino gorilla. Felix Burton explained the album's concept as "not geared to one specific vibe. Musically, we made it so that it wasn't just for cokeheads who wanted pounding beats all night," a philosophy that gave the duo "musical freedom". As the title for the album, it was explained by the duo as "raw" and "soulful", as well as "about being happy about things that don't fit in" and "things that are a bit different. That's why the album's got an albino gorilla on the cover."

=== Collaboration ===
During a July 2000 appearance on Total Request Live, Janet Jackson expressed admiration for Basement Jaxx's debut album Remedy and contacted the duo to collaborate. Basement Jaxx approached Jackson to collaborate on "Get Me Off" for the album, though the singer ultimately declined. Buxton recalled the collaboration attempt as follows: "She told us she loved our stuff, but she thought we were Zero 7. We wished her every success in hooking up with a British dance duo eventually and said, 'Cheerio, Celine.'"

== Release and re-issue ==
The album's first single, "Romeo", was released on 4 June 2001, three weeks before Rooty was released on 25 June. Further singles released from the album were "Jus 1 Kiss" on 17 September, "Where's Your Head At" on 19 November, "Get Me Off" on 17 June 2002 and "Do Your Thing" in Australia only on 24 February 2003. The album was reissued in late 2022, 20 years after it was first released.

== Reception ==
Professional ratings
Aggregate scores
Source	Rating
Metacritic	82/100
Review scores
Source	Rating
AllMusic	5/5 stars
Blender	4/5 stars
Entertainment Weekly	A−
The Guardian	4/5 stars
NME	8/10
Pitchfork	3.8/10
Q	4/5 stars
Rolling Stone	3.5/5 stars
Spin	8/10
The Village Voice	A−

Rooty pulls together individual strands of London music that typically wouldn’t mix, particularly in the pre-broadband internet era when musical boundaries were more zealously guarded. No one would bat an eyelid at a punk house jam or R&B garage shuffler in 2021; back then, these kind of mixtures were more unusual, which makes Rooty a very prophetic album — a 5G release in the era of dial-up.

Rooty has been well received by critics. John Bush of AllMusic gave it 5 out of 5 stars, calling it "so raw you can't believe they spent over an hour per track, so perfect you're glad they stopped noodling about long before most producers would, and so poppy they should get picked up by commercial radio in America as well as the rest of the world". David Browne of Entertainment Weekly gave it an A− grade and called the album "where heart and feet meet and lovingly coexist". Robert Christgau of Village Voice gave it the same grade, writing "no catchier collection of jingles has come to my attention since Steve Miller made his mint off jet airliners". Billboard said the album "revels in exploiting rhythms that shouldn't work—but definitely do". PopMatters's Andy Hermann was mixed, calling the album "either a brilliantly innovative record, or an unlistenable mess, depending on your point of view".

Pitchfork's initial opinion on the album, however, was generally negative. While calling band members Felix Buxton and Simon Ratcliffe "two of the weirdest, most innovative and talented house producers on the scene," reviewer Malcolm Seymour III wrote that "[Basement Jaxx] have taken kitsch too far," noting that the music is "often so tacky that it's impossible to stomach." However, Pitchfork would later name Rooty the 33rd best album of the 2000s.

Q listed Rooty as one of the best 50 albums of 2001. Kludge ranked it at number three on their list of top 10 albums of 2001.

== Track listing ==
All tracks are written by Felix Buxton and Simon Ratcliffe, except where noted. Songwriting credits adapted from BMI.

Rooty track listing
No.	Title	Writer(s)	Length
1.	"Romeo"		3:36
2.	"Breakaway"	Buxton; Ratcliffe; Bernard "Beloyd" Taylor	3:22
3.	"S.F.M."		2:39
4.	"Kissalude"	Buxton; Ratcliffe; Alma Duah	0:20
5.	"Jus 1 Kiss"	Buxton; Ratcliffe; Bernard Edwards; Nile Rodgers	4:24
6.	"Broken Dreams"	Buxton; Ratcliffe; Digno García; Glen Powell	3:07
7.	"I Want U"		3:26
8.	"Get Me Off"		4:49
9.	"Where's Your Head At"	Buxton; Ratcliffe; Gary Numan	4:43
10.	"Freakalude"	Buxton; Ratcliffe; Derrick Carter	0:29
11.	"Crazy Girl"		3:20
12.	"Do Your Thing"	Buxton; Ratcliffe; Blue Mitchell	4:41
13.	"All I Know"		3:47
Total length:			42:43

Japanese edition bonus disc
No.	Title	Length
1.	"Romeo" (Shinichi Osawa Tokyo Garage Mix)	5:03
2.	"Romeo" (Shinichi Osawa Tokyo Garage Mix Radio Edit)	3:50
Total length:		8:53

Sample credits

- "Breakaway" contains samples of "Lady Sun" and "You Are a Winner", both written by Bernard "Beloyd" Taylor and performed by Earth, Wind & Fire.
- "Jus 1 Kiss" contains samples of "You Can't Do It Alone", written by Bernard Edwards and Nile Rodgers and performed by Chic.
- "Broken Dreams" contains samples of "Costa Brava", written by Digno García and Glen Powell and performed by Felix de Ypacarai y sus Paraguayos.
- "Where's Your Head At" contains samples of "M.E." and "This Wreckage", both written and performed by Gary Numan.
- "Do Your Thing" contains samples of "Fungi Mama", written by Blue Mitchell and performed by Kenny Barron.

== Personnel ==
Credits for Rooty adapted from album liner notes.

Basement Jaxx

- Felix Buxton – mixing, production, vocals on "Breakaway", "Jus 1 Kiss", "Crazy Girl" and "All I Know"
- Simon Ratcliffe – mixing, production

Additional musicians

- Derrick Carter – vocals on "Get Me Off"
- Cassie – vocals on "Breakaway" and "S.F.M."
- Cherokee – vocals on "Get Me Off"
- Quentin Collins – trumpet on "Broken Dreams"
- Corryne – backing vocals on "Romeo"
- Crystal – vocals on "Get Me Off"
- Damien Peachey – vocals on "Where's Your Head At"
- Jill Draper – vocals on "Breakaway"
- Alma Duah – vocals on "Kissalude"
- Kele Le Roc – vocals on "Romeo"
- Lion – vocals on "S.F.M."
- Mandy – vocals on "I Want U" and "Get Me Off"
- Elliot May – vocals on "Do Your Thing"
- Michael Moog – backing vocals on "Where's Your Head At"
- Erick Morillo – backing vocals on "Where's Your Head At"
- Junior Sanchez – backing vocals on "Where's Your Head At"
- Sha – vocals on "Broken Dreams"

Production

- Mike Marsh – mastering

Design

- Anna Boye – photography
- René Habermacher – airbrushing
- Kidney – illustration, typography
- Mat Maitland – art direction, design
- Gerard Saint – art direction, design

== Charts ==
=== Weekly charts ===
Weekly chart performance for Rooty
Chart (2001)	Peak position
Australian Albums (ARIA)	23
Belgian Albums (Ultratop Flanders)	15
Belgian Albums (Ultratop Wallonia)	41
Danish Albums (Hitlisten)	33
Dutch Albums (Album Top 100)	59
Finnish Albums (Suomen virallinen lista)	38
French Albums (SNEP)	92
German Albums (Offizielle Top 100)	100
Irish Albums (IRMA)	15
New Zealand Albums (RMNZ)	15
Norwegian Albums (VG-lista)	2
Swedish Albums (Sverigetopplistan)	48
UK Albums (Official Charts)	5
US Top Dance Albums (Billboard)	5

=== Year-end charts ===
Year-end chart performance for Rooty
Chart (2001)	Position
UK Albums (OCC)	103

== Certifications and sales ==
Certifications and sales for Rooty
Region	Certification	Certified units/sales
Australia (ARIA)	Gold	35,000^{^}
United Kingdom (BPI)	Platinum	300,000^{‡}
United States	—	162,000
^{^} Shipments figures based on certification alone.^{‡} Sales+streaming figures based on certification alone.
