= Jump n' Shout =

1999 single by Basement Jaxx

Single by Basement Jaxx

from the album Remedy
- Released: 25 October 1999
- Genre: Ragga
- Length: 4:42
- Label: XL
- Songwriters: Felix Buxton; Mark James; Simon Ratcliffe
- Producer: Basement Jaxx

Basement Jaxx singles chronology
"Rendez-Vu" (1999)	"Jump n' Shout" (1999)	"Bingo Bango" (2000)

"Jump n' Shout" is a song recorded by English electronic music duo Basement Jaxx. It was released on 25 October 1999 by XL Recordings as the third single from their debut album, Remedy.

== Composition ==
"Jump n' Shout" features ragga vocals by MC Slarta John.

== Release ==
"Jump n' Shout" was released on 25 October 1999 by record label XL. It reached number 12 on the UK Singles Chart.

== Music video ==
A music video was released to promote the single.

== Track listings ==
UK CD

1. "Jump n' Shout" (edit) – 3:35
2. "La Photo" – 3:57
3. "I Beg U" – 8:33

UK 12-inch

1. "Jump n' Shout" – 5:21
2. "I Beg U" – 8:33
3. "Jump n' Shout" (Boo Slinga dub) – 8:54
