= Where's Your Head At =

2001 single by Basement Jaxx

Single by Basement Jaxx

from the album Rooty
- Released: 19 November 2001
- Genre: House; rave; funk; hip hop; electro
- Length: 4:43 (album version); 3:57 (single edit)
- Label: Beggars Group XL
- Songwriters: Felix Buxton; Simon Radcliffe; Gary Numan
- Producer: Basement Jaxx

Basement Jaxx singles chronology
| "Jus 1 Kiss" (2001) | "Where's Your Head At" (2001) | "Get Me Off" (2002) |

"Where's Your Head At" is a song by English electronic music duo Basement Jaxx. It was released as the third single from their second album, Rooty, on 19 November 2001. The song is based on samples from Gary Numan's songs "M.E." and "This Wreckage". The song peaked at number nine in Canada and the United Kingdom, number 16 in Australia, and number 39 on the US Billboard Modern Rock Tracks chart, the band's only charting single on a non-dance music chart in the United States. The song ranked at number 83 on Pitchfork Media's list of the "Top 500 Tracks of the 2000s".

== Music video ==
The music video, directed by Traktor, starts with a working class man (played by British actor Damian Samuels) entering a mental hospital in Prague ("the armpit of nowhere" as he calls it) to meet up with a scientist man who claims to have "the latest thing in pop music" with the visiting man leaving a fictional "Urban Turban Records" branded bag on his chair. Meanwhile, an unconscious guitarist is shown being wheeled away on a hospital gurney, with the song starting when he lifts his head.

The man then meets up with a scientist (played by Czech actor Petr Janiš), who then shows him his idea – monkeys playing music – with the help of several props. The protagonist seems unconvinced by the presentation. The laboratory secretary then suggests that the scientist should demonstrate the idea instead. He is then led into another room and sat behind a protective screen, with a view of a chamber containing instruments and DJing equipment. Three monkeys are brought into the chamber and start to play the instruments – it is revealed that their faces are those of humans (two of the monkeys have the faces of band members Felix Buxton and Simon Ratcliffe). After playing for a while, another monkey appears and all the monkeys suddenly start destroying the equipment, a behaviour which inexplicably carries over into the scientist observing the performance. The group of monkeys then surround the main character, who promptly flees.

During his escape, the protagonist stumbles upon a room containing a monkey and an unconscious human both hooked up to a machine. The monkey's face then becomes more human in appearance. The protagonist, now horrified, sees a diagram on the wall showcasing pictures of a human brain pointing towards several monkey brains. It turns out the "latest thing in pop music" is an experiment where musicians' brains are being transferred to monkeys, and he is planned to be the next victim. The video ends with him grabbing his bag and escaping down a laundry chute to a sauna-like room with men who have monkey-like faces, only to be cornered by the scientist and a dog, who also has the face of the scientist.

The video won two awards at the 11th Annual Music Video Production Awards for Best Electronica Video and Best Directorial Debut. Pitchfork ranked the video at number 24 in their list of The Top 50 Music Videos of the 2000s.

== Remixes ==
In 2011, DJ Chuckie created a mashup of the song with Cold Blank's remix of "Cal State Anthem" and played it at the Electric Daisy Carnival in Las Vegas, as well as several other festivals and events around the world. In 2023, 100 Gecs released a remix of the song, with the title "where's my head at _".

== Track listing ==
1. "Where's Your Head At"
2. "Where's Your Head At" (Stanton Warriors mix)
3. "Romeo" (acoustic mix)

== Charts ==
=== Weekly charts ===
Weekly chart performance for "Where's Your Head At"
| Chart (2001–2002) | Peak position |
|---|---|
| Australia (ARIA) | 16 |
| Belgium (Ultratop 50 Flanders) | 44 |
| Belgium (Ultratip Bubbling Under Wallonia) | 8 |
| Canada (Nielsen SoundScan) | 9 |
| Europe (Eurochart Hot 100) | 44 |
| Ireland (IRMA) | 19 |
| Ireland Dance (IRMA) | 1 |
| Netherlands (Single Top 100) | 63 |
| New Zealand (Recorded Music NZ) | 38 |
| Scottish Singles Sales (Official Charts) | 14 |
| UK Singles (Official Charts) | 9 |
| UK Dance (Official Charts) | 3 |
| UK Indie (Official Charts) | 2 |
| US Alternative Airplay (Billboard) | 39 |
| US Dance Club Songs (Billboard) | 3 |
| US Dance Singles Sales (Billboard) | 2 |

=== Year-end charts ===
Year-end chart performance for "Where's Your Head At"
| Chart (2002) | Position |
|---|---|
| Canada (Nielsen SoundScan) | 60 |
| US Maxi-Singles Sales (Billboard) | 20 |

== Certifications and sales ==
Certifications and sales for "Where's Your Head At"
| Region | Certification | Certified units/sales |
|---|---|---|
| Australia (ARIA) | Gold | 35,000^{^} |
| Canada (Music Canada) | Gold | 40,000^{‡} |
| New Zealand (RMNZ) | Platinum | 30,000^{‡} |
| United Kingdom (BPI) | Gold | 400,000^{‡} |
^{^} Shipments figures based on certification alone.^{‡} Sales+streaming figures based on certification alone.

== Release history ==
Release dates and formats for "Where's Your Head At"
| Region | Date | Format(s) | Label(s) | Ref. |
|---|---|---|---|---|
| United States | 29 October 2001 | Alternative radio | Astralwerks | |
| Australia | 19 November 2001 | CD | Remote Control; XL | |
| United Kingdom | 26 November 2001 | 12-inch vinyl; CD; DVD | XL | |
| Australia | 21 January 2002 | 12-inch vinyl | Remote Control; XL | |

== Cover versions ==
US noise rock band Melkbelly released a cover version of the song in 2018.

In 2023, US hyperpop duo 100 Gecs released a remixed version, titled “Where’s My Head At_”.
