= Rendez-Vu =

1999 single by Basement Jaxx

Single by Basement Jaxx

from the album Remedy
- B-side: "Miracles Keep on Playin'"; "All U Crazies"
- Released: 2 August 1999
- Genre: House; techno-folk
- Length: 5:46 (album version); 3:45 (radio edit)
- Label: XL
- Songwriters: Simon Ratcliffe; Felix Buxton
- Producer: Basement Jaxx

Basement Jaxx singles chronology
| "Red Alert" (1999) | "Rendez-Vu" (1999) | "Jump n' Shout" (1999) |

Music video
- "Rendez-Vu" on YouTube

"Rendez-Vu" is a song by English electronic music duo Basement Jaxx. It was released on 2 August 1999 as the second single from their debut album, Remedy (1999). "Rendez-Vu" reached number four on the UK Singles Chart and number one on the US Dance Club Play chart. It also reached number one on the Canadian RPM Dance 30 chart and number 21 in both Iceland and Ireland.

== Music video ==
The music video for the song was directed by American director Evan Bernard, set in a Hispanic town and depicts a love story between a man and a woman. The woman has a jealous Mexican wrestler boyfriend who smashes her new lover's hand, which is replaced by a record needle. Both men tell this incident to their respective friends and meet in the town for a showdown (where a guitarist also happens to be telling the story to a few locals up to that point). The man and the wrestler meet and settle things with a best of three in rock, paper, scissors. The man wins and is reunited with his lover as the town celebrates. In the end, it is all shown to be the dream of a sleeping dog.

== Track listings ==
Standard CD and cassette single

1. "Rendez-Vu" (radio edit)
2. "Miracles Keep on Playin'" ("Red Alert" remix)
3. "All U Crazies"

UK and US 12-inch single

A1. "Rendez-Vu"
B1. "Miracles Keep on Playin'" ("Red Alert" remix)
B2. "All U Crazies"

Italian 12-inch single

1. "Rendez-Vu" (extended mix)
2. "Rendez-Vu" (radio edit)
3. "Miracles Keep on Playin'" ("Red Alert" remix)
4. "All U Crazies"

== Charts ==
=== Weekly charts ===
| Chart (1999) | Peak position |
|---|---|
| Belgium (Ultratip Bubbling Under Flanders) | 2 |
| Canada (Nielsen SoundScan) | 17 |
| Canada Dance/Urban (RPM) | 2 |
| Europe (Eurochart Hot 100) | 18 |
| Iceland (Íslenski Listinn Topp 40) | 21 |
| Ireland (IRMA) | 21 |
| Netherlands (Dutch Top 40) | 24 |
| Netherlands (Single Top 100) | 61 |
| Scottish Singles Sales (Official Charts) | 5 |
| UK Singles (Official Charts) | 4 |
| UK Dance (Official Charts) | 1 |
| UK Indie (Official Charts) | 1 |
| US Dance Club Songs (Billboard) | 1 |

=== Year-end charts ===
| Chart (1999) | Position |
|---|---|
| Canada Dance/Urban (RPM) | 14 |
| Netherlands (Dutch Top 40) | 182 |
| UK Singles (OCC) | 126 |

== Certifications ==
| Region | Certification | Certified units/sales |
|---|---|---|
| United Kingdom (BPI) | Silver | 200,000^{‡} |
^{‡} Sales+streaming figures based on certification alone.

== Release history ==
| Region | Date | Format(s) | Label(s) | Ref. |
|---|---|---|---|---|
| United Kingdom | 2 August 1999 | 12-inch vinyl; CD; cassette | XL | |
| United States | 18 January 2000 | Contemporary hit; alternative radio | Astralwerks | |
