= Vula Malinga =

American-born English singer (born 1980)

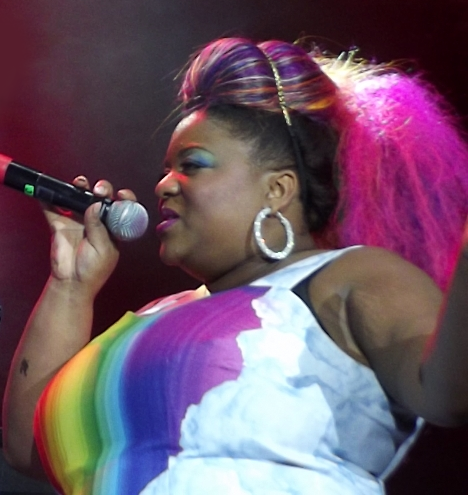
- Malinga performing with Basement Jaxx at the Orange Warsaw Festival in 2013

Background information
- Born: May 15, 1980 (age 45); Baytown, Texas
- Genres: Dance; Soul; Gospel
- Occupations: Singer; songwriter
- Instrument: Vocals
- Years active: 2001–present
- Label: DivaGeek Records

Vula Malinga (born May 15, 1980) is an American-born British singer.

== Career ==
Born in the United States to South African parents, she was raised in Hackney, London. Her religious parents supported her singing talents by allowing her to join the church choir, which resulted in her becoming one of the lead singers for the London Community Gospel Choir.

This brought her to the notice of Basement Jaxx, with whom she sang lead on their 2005 single "Oh My Gosh". The collaboration continues to this day, and led to her supporting fellow Basement Jaxx singer Sam Sparro on his tour.

In 2007, she sang lead vocals on BBC South's re-recording of the hymn "Amazing Grace", created to help mark the 200 years since the passing of the Abolition of the Slave Trade Act. In 2008, Malinga began developing her own music under her own record label, DivaGeek Records, releasing her first single "Wondering Why" in October.

In 2009, she sang co-lead vocals for Dizzee Rascal on his 2009 album Tongue n' Cheek, and has supported him on live appearances, including BBC Radio 1's Live Lounge, Later... with Jools Holland and the 2009 BBC Electric Proms.

"Better Days", the title song of Incognito's 2016 album In Search of Better Days, features Malinga as lead singer.

In 2019, she collaborated as featured artist with English DJ Riton and Dutch producer Oliver Heldens on the song "Turn Me On", which interpolates "Doctor Love" by First Choice and "Don't Go" by Yazoo.

Malinga performed live at Trevor Nelson's Soul Christmas at the Royal Albert Hall in 2019.

Malinga was one of six singers for a BBC Proms night dedicated to Northern Soul in 2023.

Malinga was one of four singers for a BBC Proms night dedicated to Disco on 20th July 2024.

== Discography ==
=== As a lead vocalist ===
- MJ Cole – "Wondering Why" (2003)
- MJ Cole & Wideboys featuring Vula – "Nothing But Trouble" (2005)
- Wideboys & MJ Cole featuring Vula – "Body Language" (2005)
- Basement Jaxx – "Oh My Gosh" (2006)
- Basement Jaxx – "Hush Boy" (2006)
- Vula Malinga – "If You Want It" (2008)
- Basement Jaxx – "Galactical" (2014)
- Background vocals on the Sam Smith song "Pray"
- Riton and Oliver Heldens featuring Vula – "Turn Me On" (2019)
- Pete Tong featuring Jules Buckley, Vula & The Heritage Orchestra) – "Love Can't Turn Around" (2021)
- Charlie Stacey – "Music Is Healing" (2022)
- T2 - "Heartbroken"
