= Red Alert (song) =

1999 single by Basement Jaxx

Single by Basement Jaxx

from the album Remedy
- B-side: "Razocaine"
- Released: 19 April 1999
- Genre: Club
- Length: 4:17
- Label: XL
- Songwriters: Felix Buxton; Simon Radcliffe
- Producer: Basement Jaxx

Basement Jaxx singles chronology
"Fly Life" (1996)	"Red Alert" (1999)	"Rendez-Vu" (1999)

Music video
- "Red Alert" on YouTube

"Red Alert" is a song by English electronic music duo Basement Jaxx. It was released on 19 April 1999 by record label XL as the first single from their debut album, Remedy (1999). The vocals from the track were provided by Blu James. It reached number five on the UK Singles Chart and became their first number-one hit on the US Billboard Dance Club Play chart. As of September 2023, the single has sold and streamed 600,000 units in the United Kingdom, allowing it to receive a platinum certification from the British Phonographic Industry (BPI). Two different music videos were produced to accompany the song; the UK version was directed by Dawn Shadforth.

== Background and release ==
"Red Alert" was written by Basement Jaxx members Felix Buxton and Simon Radcliffe. Craig Roseberry from Billboard cited Parliament and Funkadelic as inspirations for the track. Vocals on the track are sung by Blu James. In the United Kingdom, XL Recordings released the song on 19 April 1999 as two CD singles and a 12-inch single. In the United States, where Astralwerks served as the song's label, it was released on 13 July 1999 across two formats: a maxi-CD single and a 12-inch single. It was also released in Canada on 13 July.

== Critical response ==
The song received critical acclaim from music critics. Robert Christgau and AllMusic's John Bush both chose it as one of their track picks from Remedy. Marc Savlov from The Austin Chronicle described it as a "club staple" with the "propulsive, feel-fucked-up joy." Joshua Klein from The A.V. Club stated, "For the BPM-minded, the retro single 'Red Alert' has more than enough faux funk and chic camp to keep the masses moving, proving that Buxton and Ratcliffe know well enough to think with their feet as well as their heads." Larry Flick from Billboard magazine described the song as a "zippy, ears-pricking pop/dance track", and noted further that it is loaded with "space-age lasers, bloopy bounce rhythms, an unexpected dollop of cello, and a beat meant to ignite the airwaves into a froth of summertime glory." He also added that it is "a gallon hat full of fun, with a female vocal that will force fingers to drum, toes to tap, and heads to nod with abandon. The message here: oh, never mind, it's just about dancing and letting the music raise your soul to the rafters." Scottish Daily Record named it "classic disco with a heavy slice of feel-good 70s beats."

Stevie Chick from NME commented, "A truly rockin' P-Funk groove in the classic Basement Jaxx style, 'Red Alert' is a smouldering funky track with dirty basslines, sirens, synths and a pure-sexy female vocal to boot. It's twisted punk garage for 1999." Writing for Rolling Stone, Barry Walters called the song a "sharp, steady groove is subverted by a succession of P-Funk chanting, G-funk synth screeching, string-section interludes, furious bass doodles and sassy diva wails." Amanda Nowinski from Salon commented that "the everywhere club anthem that almost everyone with the prefix "DJ" seems to have already remixed, continues the hesher ragga vibe with the added P-Funk bass lines and who-you-lookin'-at? vocals." Sunday Mirror said it is "so funky it hurts." USA Today's Edna Gundersen said the song and "Rendez-Vu" "have personality as well as slapping bass lines and deep grooves." Bill Werde, assistant editor of CMJ New Music Monthly listed it as one of his best tracks of 1999. The Village Voice listed the track at number 27 on their annual Pazz & Jop poll.

== Music video ==
The song has two different music videos, one for the UK and the other for the US. In the UK version, which was directed by Dawn Shadforth, Basement Jaxx work at a greasy spoon cafe that is entered by a group of androids, who causes a meteor that was flying above to crash into the diner, which turns everyone into a group of rave-themed zombies. While this happens, one chef gets a plate in his head, another is morphed wearing a Chinese dragon head, the waitress is given an outfit in the similar style of the androids and several cafe patrons are forced to dance.

The US version was shot in New York City, directed by Brian Beletic with creative direction by David Levinel, and features the Giuliani-era NYPD busting musical instrument owners. This version takes place in a world where music is outlawed and follows cops as they find and bust musicians, similar to the plot of Fahrenheit 451 but substituting books with music. The video includes cameo appearances by other musicians being arrested, most notably Moby.

== Legacy ==
Pitchfork ranked the song at number 69 in their list of the "Top 200 Songs of the 1990s". Dutch author Ray Kluun's first and well-known novel Komt een vrouw bij de dokter (Love Life) quoted the lyrics from the song. Mixmag included the Steve Gurley mix of "Red Alert" in their list of "16 of the Best Uplifting Vocal Garage Tracks". In 2022, Rolling Stone ranked it number 80 in their list of "200 Greatest Dance Songs of All Time".

== Track listings ==
- UK CD1
1. "Red Alert" (Jaxx radio mix)
2. "Razocaine"
3. "Red Alert" (Jaxx Nitedub)
- UK CD2 and US 12-inch single
1. "Red Alert" (Jaxx club mix)
2. "Red Alert" (Eric Morrillo + Harry Romero dub)
3. "Red Alert" (Steve Gurley mix)
- US and Canadian maxi-CD single, Australian CD single
1. "Red Alert" (Jaxx radio mix)
2. "Razocaine"
3. "Red Alert" (Jaxx Nitedub)
4. "Red Alert" (Jaxx club mix)
5. "Red Alert" (Eric Morrillo + Harry Romero dub)
6. "Red Alert" (Steve Gurley mix)

== Charts ==
=== Weekly charts ===
Chart (1999)	Peak position
Australia (ARIA)	84
Belgium (Ultratop 50 Flanders)	36
Canada Dance/Urban (RPM)	9
Europe (Eurochart Hot 100)	25
France (SNEP)	70
Iceland (Íslenski Listinn Topp 40)	28
Ireland (IRMA)	22
Italy (Musica e dischi)	37
Netherlands (Dutch Top 40)	31
Netherlands (Single Top 100)	41
Scottish Singles Sales (Official Charts)	6
UK Singles (Official Charts)	5
UK Dance (Official Charts)	1
UK Indie (Official Charts)	1
US Dance Club Songs (Billboard)	1
US Dance Singles Sales (Billboard)	29

=== Year-end charts ===
Chart (1999)	Position
UK Singles (OCC)	81
UK Airplay (Music Week)	42
US Dance Club Play (Billboard)	14

== Certifications ==
Region	Certification	Certified units/sales
New Zealand (RMNZ)	Gold	15,000^{‡}
United Kingdom (BPI)	Platinum	600,000^{‡}
^{‡} Sales+streaming figures based on certification alone.

== Release history ==
Region	Date	Format(s)	Label(s)	Ref.
United Kingdom	19 April 1999	12-inch vinyl; CD	XL	
Canada	13 July 1999	Maxi-CD	XL	
United States	13 July 1999	12-inch vinyl; maxi-CD	Astralwerks	
