= Remedy (Basement Jaxx album) =

Studio album by Basement Jaxx
- Released: 10 May 1999
- Recorded: 1998
- Genres: House; disco
- Length: 57:03 (CD); 65:51 (LP)
- Label: XL
- Producers: Felix Buxton; Simon Ratcliffe

Basement Jaxx chronology
| Remedy (1999) | Rooty (2001) |

Singles from Remedy
- 1. "Red Alert" Released: 19 April 1999; 2. "Rendez-Vu" Released: 2 August 1999; 3. "Jump n' Shout" Released: 25 October 1999; 4. "Bingo Bango" Released: 3 April 2000

Remedy is the debut studio album by English electronic music duo Basement Jaxx, released in May 1999 by record label XL.

The album was very well received critically, and reached number 4 in the UK Albums Chart. Four singles were released from the album: "Red Alert", "Rendez-Vu", "Jump n' Shout" and "Bingo Bango".

== Background ==
When Basement Jaxx first rose to stardom, the duo was unsatisfied with the state of dance music, describing it as "linear" and "close-minded". "Most dance music is very shiny and so robotic," Simon Ratcliffe told Rolling Stone. "There's just not much feeling. If we made a record like that, we'd be just like everybody else." Consequently, the title Remedy was chosen as "an antidote" to the "poisons" they saw within dance music. "A lot of it seems quite superficial," Ratcliffe said. "For me, Remedy was always about togetherness, which is the appeal of house music. You may be black; you may be white; you may be Jew; you may be gentile. It doesn’t matter in our house," Felix Buxton said.

== Release ==
Remedy was released on 10 May 1999 in the UK and 3 August 1999 in the U.S. by record label XL. It reached number 4 in the UK Albums Chart.

Four singles were released from the album: "Red Alert" on 19 April, "Rendez-Vu" on 2 August, "Jump n' Shout" on 25 October and "Bingo Bango" on 3 April 2000. "Red Alert" was the first Basement Jaxx single to reach number 1 on the U.S. Hot Dance Music/Club Play chart. "Rendez-Vu" also reached number 1 later in the year and "Bingo Bango" became their third number 1 single the following year.

== Critical reception ==
Professional ratings
Aggregate scores
| Source | Rating |
|---|---|
| Metacritic | 88/100 |
Review scores
| Source | Rating |
| AllMusic | 5/5 stars |
| Alternative Press | 5/5 |
| Entertainment Weekly | A |
| The Guardian | 4/5 stars |
| Melody Maker | 4.5/5 stars |
| NME | 9/10 |
| Pitchfork | 3.5/10 |
| Q | 4/5 stars |
| Rolling Stone | 4/5 stars |
| USA Today | 3.5/4 stars |

Remedy holds a rating of 88 out of 100 on review aggregator website Metacritic, indicating "universal acclaim". AllMusic's John Bush called the album "one of the most assured, propulsive full lengths the dance world has seen since Daft Punk's Homework." Marc Weingarten of Entertainment Weekly described Remedy as a "blissful joy ride", while Ted Kessler of NME called it "probably as good a dance album as anyone from these Isles has produced this decade." The Austin Chronicle's Marc Savlov called the album "a top beat assemblage to rival any release this year". Alternative Press wrote: "Somewhere on this album, Basement Jaxx have created a song that you're going to love, no matter what sort of music you listen to [...] the mere existence of Remedy shows hope for modern music's future." Melody Maker wrote that the album "repeatedly, and durably, synthesises those notoriously unstable dance music elements; the dizzying dancefloor rush and the complex, long-lasting emotional hit", calling it "deft and obviously heartfelt" and "truly great." Thomas Bangalter of Daft Punk proclaimed the album as "better than [theirs]."

The A.V. Club was less favourable, saying Remedy was "nowhere near as revolutionary as the hype would insinuate", though noting that it does "offer its distinct pleasures." Robert Christgau of The Village Voice remarked: "Like so much good house, more fun than reading the newspaper and less fun than advertised."

Remedy was included in the book 1001 Albums You Must Hear Before You Die. In 2012, Rolling Stone placed Remedy at number 13 on its list of the 30 Greatest EDM Albums of All Time.

== Track listing ==
All tracks written by Felix Buxton and Simon Ratcliffe, except where noted.

Remedy CD track listing
| No. | Title | Writer(s) | Length |
|---|---|---|---|
| 1. | "Rendez-Vu" | | 5:45 |
| 2. | "Yo-Yo" | | 4:29 |
| 3. | "Jump n' Shout" | Buxton; Mark James; Ratcliffe | 4:42 |
| 4. | "U Can't Stop Me" | | 3:40 |
| 5. | "Jaxxalude" | | 0:35 |
| 6. | "Red Alert" | Buxton; Ratcliffe; Harvey Mason; Tyrone Brown; John Blake Jr.; Leonard Gibbs; James Simmons; Richard Steacker; Millard Vinson | 4:17 |
| 7. | "Jazzalude" | | 0:23 |
| 8. | "Always Be There" | | 6:24 |
| 9. | "Sneakalude" | | 0:11 |
| 10. | "Same Old Show" | Neol Davies; Kenny Lewis; Lawrence Parker | 5:55 |
| 11. | "Bingo Bango" | Buxton; Ratcliffe; Jose Ibata; Rolando Ibata | 5:58 |
| 12. | "Gemilude" | | 0:47 |
| 13. | "Stop 4 Love" | | 4:53 |
| 14. | "Don't Give Up" | | 5:15 |
| 15. | "Being with U" | | 3:49 |
| Total length: | | | 57:03 |

Japanese edition bonus track
| No. | Title | Length |
|---|---|---|
| 16. | "Better Days" (previously released as "Betta Daze") | 6:07 |
| Total length: | | 63:10 |

LP track listing

Side one
| No. | Title | Writer(s) | Length |
|---|---|---|---|
| 1. | "Rendez-Vu" | | 7:10 |
| 2. | "Yo-Yo" | | 5:04 |
| 3. | "Jump n' Shout" | Buxton; Mark James; Ratcliffe | 5:21 |

Side two
| No. | Title | Writer(s) | Length |
|---|---|---|---|
| 1. | "U Can't Stop Me" | | 3:40 |
| 2. | "Jaxxalude" | | 0:35 |
| 3. | "Red Alert" | Buxton; Ratcliffe; Harvey Mason; Tyrone Brown; John Blake Jr.; Leonard Gibbs; James Simmons; Richard Steacker; Millard Vinson | 6:10 |
| 4. | "Jazzalude" | | 0:24 |
| 5. | "Always Be There" | | 6:23 |

Side three
| No. | Title | Writer(s) | Length |
|---|---|---|---|
| 1. | "Sneakalude" | | 0:11 |
| 2. | "Same Old Show" | Neol Davies; Kenny Lewis; Lawrence Parker | 8:46 |
| 3. | "Bingo Bango" | Buxton; Ratcliffe; Jose Ibata; Rolando Ibata | 7:26 |

Side four
| No. | Title | Length |
|---|---|---|
| 1. | "Gemilude" | 0:47 |
| 2. | "Stop 4 Love" | 4:52 |
| 3. | "Don't Give Up" | 5:13 |
| 4. | "Being with U" | 3:49 |
| Total length: | | 65:51 |

Sample credits

- "Red Alert" contains a sample of "Far Beyond" written by Harvey Mason, Tyrone Brown, John Blake Jr., Leonard Gibbs, James Simmons, Richard Steacker, Millard Vinson and performed by Locksmith.
- "Same Old Show" contains a sample of "Hip Hop vs. Rap" written by Lawrence Parker and performed by KRS-One, a sample of "On My Radio" written by Neol Davies and performed by The Selecter, and a sample of "Ooooh Baby" written by Kenny Lewis and performed by Veda Simpson.
- "Bingo Bango" contains a sample of "Merenque" written by Jose Ibata and Rolando Ibata and performed by Bolivar.

== Personnel ==
Credits adapted from the album's liner notes.

Basement Jaxx

- Felix Buxton – mixing, production, vocals (on "Don't Give Up" and "Being with U")
- Simon Ratcliffe – mixing, producer, vocals (on "Don't Give Up")

Additional vocalists

- Gwyn Jay Allen – backing vocals (on "Don't Give Up")
- Brett – vocals (on "Jaxxalude")
- Benji Candelario – shouts (on "U Can't Stop Me")
- Roland Clark – backing vocals (on "Being with U")
- Alma "The Soul" Duah – vocals (on "Yo-Yo"), breaths (on "Jazzalude")
- DJ Gemini – vocals (on "Gemilude")
- Blue James – vocals (on "Red Alert")
- Jaxx Allstars – backing vocals (on "Gemilude")
- Slarta John – vocals (on "Jump N' Shout")
- Yvonne John Lewis – vocals (on "U Can't Stop Me")
- Jorges – "word bitz" (on "Bingo Bango")
- KDL Allstars – backing vocals (on "Red Alert")
- Monday Michiru – vocals (on "Always Be There")
- Erick Morillo – shouts (on "U Can't Stop Me")
- Nyna – "word bitz" (on "Bingo Bango")
- Patsi – vocals (on "Jaxxalude")
- Junior Sanchez – vocals (on "Jaxxalude")
- Slarta's Crew – vocals (on "Jump N' Shout")
- DJ Sneak – vocals (on "Sneakalude")
- Madman Swyli – shouts (on "Jump N' Shout")
- Cassie Watson – "word bitz" (on "Bingo Bango"), backing vocals (on "U Can't Stop Me")

Additional musicians

- Alexander Telnikoff – violin (on "Stop 4 Love")
- Ugo Delmirani – keyboards (on "Bingo Bango")

Production

- Mike Marsh – mastering

== Charts ==
=== Weekly charts ===
Weekly chart performance for Remedy
| Chart (1999–2000) | Peak position |
|---|---|
| Australian Albums (ARIA) | 65 |
| Belgian Albums (Ultratop Flanders) | 37 |
| Dutch Albums (Album Top 100) | 56 |
| French Albums (SNEP) | 71 |
| New Zealand Albums (RMNZ) | 42 |
| Norwegian Albums (VG-lista) | 2 |
| Scottish Albums (Official Charts) | 7 |
| Swedish Albums (Sverigetopplistan) | 32 |
| UK Albums (Official Charts) | 4 |
| UK Independent Albums (Official Charts) | 1 |
| Chart (2023) | Peak position |
| UK Dance Albums (Official Charts) | 15 |

=== Year-end charts ===
Year-end chart performance for Remedy
| Chart (1999) | Position |
|---|---|
| UK Albums (OCC) | 73 |

== Certifications and sales ==
Certifications and sales for Remedy
| Region | Certification | Certified units/sales |
|---|---|---|
| United Kingdom (BPI) | Platinum | 300,000^{^} |
| United States | — | 135,000 |
Summaries
| Worldwide | | 1,000,000 |
^{^} Shipments figures based on certification alone.
