= Basement Jaxx discography =

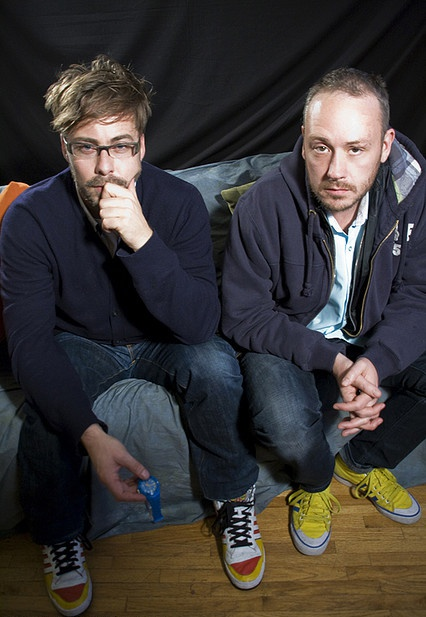
- Basement Jaxx in 2009.
- Studio albums: 7
- Extended plays: 17
- Soundtrack albums: 1
- Compilation albums: 2
- Singles: 34
- Music videos: 18

English electronic music duo Basement Jaxx have released seven studio albums, two compilation albums, 17 extended plays, thirty-four singles, one soundtrack album, and a number of other appearances.

== Albums ==
=== Studio albums ===
List of studio albums, with selected chart positions, sales figures and certifications
Title	Album details	Peak chart positions										Sales	Certifications
Title	Album details	UK	AUS	FRA	GER	IRE	NLD	NZ	NOR	SWE	US Dance	Sales	Certifications
Remedy	Released: 10 May 1999; Label: XL, Astralwerks; Formats: CD, cassette, LP	4	65	71	—	65	56	42	2	32	—	US: 135,000; World: 1,000,000	BPI: Platinum
Rooty	Released: 25 June 2001; Label: XL, Astralwerks; Formats: CD, cassette, LP	5	23	92	100	15	59	15	2	48	5	US: 162,000	BPI: Gold; ARIA: Gold
Kish Kash	Released: 20 October 2003; Label: XL, Astralwerks; Formats: CD, LP	17	40	—	—	36	—	29	—	—	2		BPI: Gold
Crazy Itch Radio	Released: 4 September 2006; Label: XL; Formats: CD, digital download	16	70	—	—	29	59	—	40	—	4		BPI: Silver
Scars	Released: 21 September 2009; Label: XL; Formats: CD, digital download	37	76	—	—	89	84	—	—	—	10		
Zephyr	Released: 7 December 2009; Label: XL; Formats: Digital download, CD	—	—	—	—	—	—	—	—	—	—		
Junto	Released: 25 August 2014; Label: Atlantic Jaxx, PIAS; Formats: Digital download, CD	30	98	—	—	65	—	—	—	—	5		
"—" denotes album that did not chart or was not released

=== Live albums ===
List of live albums
Title	Album details
Basement Jaxx vs. Metropole Orkest	Released: 11 July 2011; Label: Atlantic Jaxx; Format: CD, digital download

=== Soundtrack albums ===
List of soundtrack albums
Title	Album details
Attack the Block (with Steven Price)	Released: 16 May 2011; Label: Decca; Formats: CD, digital download

=== Compilation albums ===
List of albums, with selected chart positions and certifications
Title	Album details	Peak chart positions						Certifications
Title	Album details	UK	AUS	IRE	NLD	NZ	SWE	Certifications
Atlantic Jaxx Recordings: A Compilation	Released: 10 November 1997; Label: XL; Formats: CD, cassette, LP	—	—	—	—	—	—	
Jaxx Unreleased	Released: 3 May 2000; Label: XL; Formats: CD, cassette, LP	—	—	—	—	—	—	
The Singles	Released: 21 March 2005; Label: XL; Formats: CD, digital download	1	17	2	36	13	37	BPI: 3× Platinum
Atlantic Jaxx Recordings: A Compilation Vol. 2	Released: 3 May 2006; Label: XL; Formats: CD, cassette, LP	—	—	—	—	—	—	
Focus on Atlantic Jaxx	Released: 22 November 2010; Label: Atlantic Jaxx; Formats: Digital download	—	—	—	—	—	—	
Junto Remixed	Released: 23 October 2015; Label: Atlantic Jaxx, PIAS; Formats: CD, digital download	—	—	—	—	—	—	
Lost Tracks (1999-2009)	Released: 6 May 2020; Label: Atlantic Jaxx, PIAS; Formats: CD, digital download	—	—	—	—	—	—	
"—" denotes album that did not chart or was not released

=== Video albums ===
List of video albums
Title	Album details
The Videos	Released: 21 March 2005; Label: XL; Formats: DVD

== Extended plays ==
Title	EP details	Peak chart positions
Title	EP details	UK
EP 1	Released: 1994; Label: Wall of Sound, Atlantic Jaxx; Format: Vinyl	—
EP 2	Released: 1995; Label: Atlantic Jaxx; Formats: Vinyl	179
Summer Daze	Released: 1995; Label: Atlantic Jaxx; Formats: Vinyl	184
Sleazycheeks	Released: May 1996; Label: Atlantic Jaxx; Formats: Vinyl	—
EP 3	Released: 10 August 1996; Label: Atlantic Jaxx; Formats: Vinyl	—
Urban Haze	Released: 1997; Label: Atlantic Jaxx; Formats: Vinyl	178
Betta Daze	Released: 1999; Label: Atlantic Jaxx; Formats: Vinyl	—
Camberwell	Released: 2000; Label: Atlantic Jaxx; Formats: Vinyl	—
Xxtra Cutz	Released: 2001; Label: XL, Remote Control; Formats: Vinyl, CD	—
Span Thang	Released: 19 November 2001; Label: Atlantic Jaxx; Formats: Vinyl, CD	—
Junction	Released: 23 September 2002; Label: Atlantic Jaxx; Formats: Vinyl	—
Unreleased Mixes	Released: 12 December 2005; Label: Atlantic Jaxx; Formats: Vinyl	—
Planet 1	Released: 21 July 2008; Label: Atlantic Jaxx, XL; Formats: Vinyl	—
Planet 2	Released: 15 September 2008; Label: Atlantic Jaxx, XL; Formats: Vinyl	—
Planet 3	Released: 21 February 2009; Label: Atlantic Jaxx, XL; Formats: Vinyl	—
Jaxx Unreleased II	Released: 12 December 2010; Label: Atlantic Jaxx, XL; Formats: Digital download, vinyl	—
Angel Is Coming	Released: 2 March 2015; Label: Atlantic Jaxx; Formats: Digital download	—

== Singles ==
List of singles, with selected chart positions, showing year released and album name
Single	Year	Peak chart positions										Certifications	Album
Single	Year	UK	AUS	CAN	FIN	FRA	GER	IRE	NL	NZ	US Dance	Certifications	Album
"Samba Magic"	1995	61	—	—	—	—	—	—	—	—	—		Summer Daze
"Fly Life"	1997	19	—	—	—	—	—	—	—	—	—		EP 3
"Red Alert"	1999	5	84	—	—	70	—	22	41	—	1	BPI: Gold	Remedy
"Rendez-Vu"	1999	4	—	17	—	—	—	21	61	—	1	BPI: Silver	Remedy
"Jump n' Shout"	1999	12	—	—	—	—	—	—	—	—	—		Remedy
"Bingo Bango"	2000	13	—	—	—	—	—	—	99	—	1		Remedy
"Star / Buddy"	2000	—	—	—	—	—	—	—	—	—	—		Non-album single
"Romeo"	2001	6	82	14	—	74	—	17	82	9	5	BPI: Gold; RIANZ: Gold	Rooty
"Jus 1 Kiss"	2001	23	88	—	—	—	—	45	—	—	—		Rooty
"Where's Your Head At"	2001	9	16	9	—	—	—	19	63	38	3	ARIA: Gold; BPI: Gold	Rooty
"Get Me Off"	2002	22	43	31	—	—	—	47	—	—	26		Rooty
"Do Your Thing"	2002	32	33	—	—	—	—	—	—	—	—	BPI: Silver	Rooty
"Lucky Star" (featuring Dizzee Rascal)	2003	23	76	—	—	—	—	—	—	—	3		Kish Kash
"Good Luck" (featuring Lisa Kekaula)	2004	12	22	—	—	—	—	28	43	—	2	BPI: Silver	Kish Kash
"Plug It In" (featuring JC Chasez)	2004	22	43	—	—	—	—	45	—	—	—		Kish Kash
"Oh My Gosh" (featuring Vula Malinga)	2005	8	36	—	4	—	98	23	91	—	—		The Singles
"U Don't Know Me" (featuring Lisa Kekaula)	2005	26	56	—	12	—	—	38	—	—	—		The Singles
"Hush Boy"	2006	27	39	—	—	—	—	—	—	—	—		Crazy Itch Radio
"Take Me Back to Your House" (featuring Martina Sorbara)	2006	42	71	—	10	—	—	48	99	—	—		Crazy Itch Radio
"Hey U" (featuring Robyn)	2007	—	—	—	—	—	—	—	—	—	—		Crazy Itch Radio
"Make Me Sweat"	2007	—	—	—	—	—	—	—	—	—	—		Non-album single
"Raindrops"	2009	21	88	—	—	—	—	20	—	—	—		Scars
"Feelings Gone" (featuring Sam Sparro)	2009	122	—	—	—	—	—	—	—	—	—		Scars
"My Turn" (featuring Lightspeed Champion)	2009	—	—	—	—	—	—	—	—	—	—		Scars
"Dracula"	2011	—	—	—	—	—	—	—	—	—	—		Non-album single
"Back 2 the Wild"	2013	—	—	—	—	—	—	—	—	—	—		Junto
"What a Difference Your Love Makes" (featuring Sam Brookes)	2013	—	—	—	—	—	—	—	—	—	—		Junto
"Unicorn"	2014	—	—	—	—	—	—	—	—	—	—		Junto
"Mermaid of Salinas"	2014	—	—	—	—	—	—	—	—	—	—		Junto
"Never Say Never" (featuring EMTL)	2014	—	—	—	—	—	—	—	—	—	1		Junto
"Galactical" (featuring Vula)	2014	—	—	—	—	—	—	—	—	—	—		Junto
"Rock This Road"	2014	—	—	—	—	—	—	—	—	—	—		Junto
"Yodel Song" (featuring Sofia Shkidchenko)	2019	—	—	—	—	—	—	—	—	—	—		Non-album singles
"Express Yourself" (featuring Phebe Edwards and Niara Scarlett)	2022	—	—	—	—	—	—	—	—	—	—		Non-album singles
"Bambina" (featuring Martina Camargo)	2025	—	—	—	—	—	—	—	—	—	—		Non-album singles
"—" denotes single that did not chart or was not released

== Production and remix credits ==
List of production and remix work for other artists, with other performing artists and co-producers, showing year released and album name
Title	Year	Performing artist(s)	Original producer(s)	Album
"Reach" (Basement Jaxx "Firecracker" Mix)	1996	Lil' Mo' Yin Yang	Erick Morillo, Little Louie Vega	none
"Live Your Live with Me"	1996	Corrina Joseph	Basement Jaxx	none
"A Red Letter Day" (Basement Jaxx Nite Dub)	1997	Pet Shop Boys	Pet Shop Boys	none
"A Red Letter Day" (Basement Jaxx Vocal Mix)	1997	Pet Shop Boys	Pet Shop Boys	none
"Wish Tonite"	1997	Corrina Joseph	Basement Jaxx	none
"Lonely"	1997	Corrina Joseph	Basement Jaxx	none
"Phœnix" (Basement Jaxx Remix)	2001	Daft Punk	Thomas Bangalter, Guy-Manuel de Homem-Christo	Daft Club
"4 My People" (Basement Jaxx Remix)	2002	Missy "Misdemeanor" Elliott featuring Eve	Nisan Stewart, D-Man	Miss E... So Addictive (Re-issue)
"Like I Love You" (Basement Jaxx Vocal Mix)	2002	Justin Timberlake	The Neptunes	none
"Fix My Sink" (Basement Jaxx Bouncy Vocal Dub)	2003	DJ Sneak featuring Bear Who?	DJ Sneak, Mark Thomas Bell	none
"Shake It"	2004	JC Chasez	Simon Ratcliffe, Felix Buxton, Billy Nicholas	Schizophrenic
"Everyman... Everywoman..." (Basement Jaxx Classic II Mix)	2004	Ono	John Lennon, Yoko Ono, Jack Douglas	Open Your Box
"Everyman... Everywoman..." (Basement Jaxx Classix MAN2MAN Mix)	2004	Ono	John Lennon, Yoko Ono, Jack Douglas	none
"Cold Shoulder" (Basement Jaxx Classic Remix)	2008	Adele	Mark Ronson	none
"Cold Shoulder" (Basement Jaxx DuBB)	2008	Adele	Mark Ronson	none
"Rocking Chair"	2008	Cyndi Lauper	Lauper, Basement Jaxx	Bring Ya to the Brink
"White Sky" (Basement Jaxx Club Mix)	2010	Vampire Weekend	Vampire Weekend	Contra (Japanese limited edition)
"White Sky" (Basement Jaxx Warp Dub Mix)	2010	Vampire Weekend	Vampire Weekend	none
"White Sky" (Basement Jaxx Vamp Dub Mix)	2010	Vampire Weekend	Vampire Weekend	none
"Technologic" (Basement Jaxx Kontrol Mixx)	2014	Daft Punk	Thomas Bangalter & Guy-Manuel de Homem- Christo	Human After All: Remixes (2014 version)
"Right Now" (Basement Jaxx Remix)	2015	Mary J. Blige	Disclosure	none
"The Right Song" (Basement Jaxx Zone Dub)	2016	Tiësto and Oliver Heldens featuring Natalie La Rose	Tiësto, Oliver Heldens	none
"Say Something" (Basement Jaxx Remix)	2020	Kylie Minogue	Jon Green, Richard "Biff" Stannard, Duck Blackwell, Kylie Minogue	Disco
"Siren" (Basement Jaxx Cruise Mix)	2021	Shygirl		none
"Siren" (Basement Jaxx Joy Ride Mix)	2021	Shygirl		none
"Tonight" (Basement Jaxx remix)	2025	PinkPantheress	PinkPantheress, Aksel Arvid, Count Baldor	Fancy Some More?

== Music videos ==
List of music videos, showing year released and directors
Title	Year	Director(s)
"Fly Life"	1997	—N/a
"Red Alert" (UK version)	1999	Dawn Shadforth
"Rendez-Vu"	1999	Evan Bernard
"Jump n' Shout"	2000	Simon Bisset
"Bingo Bango"	2000	Basement Jaxx
"Romeo"	2001	Andy Hutch
"Where's Your Head At?"	2001	Traktor
"Jus 1 Kiss"	2001	New Stench
"Do Your Thing"	2001	Kim Gehrig
"Bongoloid"	2001	New Stench
"Lucky Star"	2004	Katie Dawson
"Good Luck"	2004	Mat Kirkby
"Cish Cash"	2004	Pleix
"Plug It In"	2004	Traktor
"Oh My Gosh"	2005	Mat Kirkby
"U Don't Know Me"	2005	Mat Kirkby
"Hush Boy"	2006	Phil Griffin
"Take Me Back to Your House"	2006	Dougal Wilson
"Raindrops"	2009	Jess Holzworth
"My Turn"	2009	Tomek Ducki
"Feelings Gone"	2009	Andy Soup
"Back 2 the Wild"	2013	Mat Maitland, Natalia Stuyk
"What a Difference Your Love Makes"	2013	Damian Weilers
"Never Say Never"	2014	Saman Kesh
"Unicorn"	2014	Tomek Ducki
"Rock This Road"	2014	Fidel Ruiz-Healy
"Mermaid of Salinas"	2014	Alan Masferrer
"Galactical"	2014	Hadaya Turner
"We Are Not Alone"	2014	Cyrill Oberholzer
