= Basement Jaxx vs. Metropole Orkest =

Live album with studio tracks by Basement Jaxx and Metropole Orkest
- Released: 11 July 2011
- Recorded: 3–5 November 2010 and 4 February 2011
- Venue: Muziekcentrum van de Omroep (Hilversum, the Netherlands); Muziekgebouw Frits Philips (Eindhoven, the Netherlands)
- Genre: Orchestral
- Length: 62:44
- Label: Atlantic Jaxx
- Producer: Jules Buckley; Felix Buxton

Basement Jaxx chronology
| Attack the Block (2011) | Basement Jaxx vs. Metropole Orkest (2011) | Junto (2014) |

Metropole Orkest chronology
| A Tribute to Billie Holiday (2010) | Basement Jaxx vs. Metropole Orkest (2011) | Live with the Metropole Orchestra (2011) |

Basement Jaxx vs. Metropole Orkest is a collaborative album by English electronic music duo Basement Jaxx and Dutch orchestra Metropole Orkest. The album features of older Basement Jaxx tracks rearranged for an orchestra with participated vocals from Vula Malinga, Sharlene Hector, Brendan Reilly, Oli Savill and Lisa Kekaula.

The album is a combination of recordings from that concert along with studio recordings.

== Production ==
The tracks have been reworked by Felix Buxton and conductor Jules Buckley, with the entire album taking 18 months to complete.

Buckley loosely formed the idea of re-interpreting the duo's back catalogue for live performance, but where concert programmes subsequently developed, so too did studio recordings. Buxton recalls:

"Jules’ proposal sounded cool and we were like, ‘why not?’. But it was a pretty open-ended request so there was ample opportunity to thrash out the creative details and make sure the world of Basement Jaxx fit well in this new context. We were adamant about it not being a gimmick; I’ve seen plenty of pop bands marry their dance beats or breaks with classical on a superficial level and the results have sounded a bit damp, a bit softcore. Our project needed to be genuine, to stand up..."

The duo had previously experienced working with an orchestra by collaborating with the 16-piece London Session Orchestra for the song "Good Luck" in 2003, which was a way of reimagining Basement Jaxx’s music "in a completely different way," Buxton said.

The album's recording took place at the Muziekcentrum van de Omroep in Hilversum, the Netherlands on 3–5 November 2010, and at the Muziekgebouw Frits Philips in Eindhoven, the Netherlands on 4 February 2011. They were joined by Metropole Orkest which includes a 60-piece orchestra and a 20-voice choir, with four lead vocalists: Vula Malinga, Sharlene Hector, Brendan Reilly and Lisa Kekaula.

"I could see the excited glint in Felix's eye when we first started scoring but there remained a real sense of 'where are we taking all this?' and 'how will this end up'?," Buckley said. They recorded a number of versions of certain tracks. Buckley said the unpredictability of the process was "a great big test bed of a thing" that made the final results more "powerful" and "authentic".

== Material ==
The album is a combination of recordings from the concert along with studio recordings. Five of their six studio albums received the orchestral treatment, except for their 2009 album Zephyr. The first track, "Battlement Jaxx", is new rendition from the Metropole Orkest of the Crazy Itch Radio's intro, which was a classical piece composed by British arranger Wil Malone.

Noticeably, "Where's Your Head At", a song from their 2001 album Rooty, originally was a house, dance-rock track. The song's "epic shock-pomp" was compared to Carl Orff’s "Carmina Burana".

"Mozart's Tea Party" was Buxton's first Baroque creation, which he shared was a highlight from the concert.

== Critical reception ==
Professional ratings
Aggregate scores
| Source | Rating |
|---|---|
| Metacritic | 70/100 |
Review scores
| Source | Rating |
| AllMusic | 3.5/5 stars |
| The Guardian | 3/5 stars |
| The Independent | 4/5 stars |
| The Telegraph | 4/5 stars |
| musicOMH | 3/5 stars |

Upon release, Basement Jaxx vs. Metropole Orkest received mostly positive reviews from music critics. At Metacritic, which assigns a weighted mean rating out of 100 to reviews from mainstream critics, the album received an average score of 70, based on 6 reviews. Alex Macpherson from The Guardian awarded the album 3 out of 5 stars. Reviewing the album for The Independent, Andy Gill said many of the reinterpretations of the band's material transform so comprehensively they are barely recognizable. "Switching smoothly between contemporary classical orchestrations, big-band jazz and operatic chorale, the results are frequently breathtaking in their audacity."

The album received mixed reaction from DIY

== Promotion ==
A day before their performance at the Muziekgebouw Frits Philips, on 3 February 2011, Metropole Orkest with Malinga, Hector and Reilly gave a small live ensemble version of "Do Your Thing" on the Dutch talk show De Wereld Draait Door.

Due to the big success of the Netherlands' show, the production team decided to conduct two shows at The Barbican, London. On 7 February they posted footage of their performance on their website.

The new mix of "Raindrops" called "Jaxx Club Boot" was released as a digital single on 13 November 2011.

== Track listing ==
Basement Jaxx vs. Metropole Orkest track listing
| No. | Title | Composer(s) | Length |
|---|---|---|---|
| 1. | "Battlement Jaxx" | Wil Malone | 1:16 |
| 2. | "Red Alert" | Felix Buxton; Simon Radcliffe; Harvey Mason; Tyrone Brown; John Blake Jr.; Leonard Gibbs; James Simmons; Richard Stecker; Millard Vinson | 5:36 |
| 3. | "Raindrops" | Buxton; Ratcliffe | 4:10 |
| 4. | "Mozart's Tea Party" | Buxton | 4:23 |
| 5. | "Bingo Bango" | Buxton; Radcliffe; Jose Ibata; Rolando Ibata | 3:42 |
| 6. | "Hey U" | Adrian Sical; Buxton; Ratcliffe | 4:50 |
| 7. | "Lights Go Down" | Buxton; Linda Lewis; Ratcliffe | 3:52 |
| 8. | "Violin Solo" | Herman Van Haaren | 2:27 |
| 9. | "If I Ever Recover" | Buxton; Ratcliffe | 3:50 |
| 10. | "Do Your Thing" | Buxton; Ratcliffe; Richard Mitchell | 4:13 |
| 11. | "Where's Your Head At" | Buxton; Ratcliffe; Gary Numan | 3:45 |
| 12. | "Good Luck" | Buxton; Lisa Kekaula; Ratcliffe | 5:51 |
| 13. | "Drill Loops" | Buxton; Jules Buckley | 4:27 |
| 14. | "Hush Boy" | A. D. Burrise; Buxton; J. D. Burrise; Ratcliffe; Stephen Paul Mason; Vula Malinga | 4:27 |
| 15. | "Samba Magic" | Buxton; Jorge Dalto; Ratcliffe; Tite Curet Alonso | 4:27 |
| Total length: | | | 1:03:62 |

iTunes bonus track
| No. | Title | Length |
|---|---|---|
| 16. | "Lights Go Down" (instrumental) | 3:45 |
| 17. | "Do Your Thing" (instrumental) | 3:19 |
| 18. | "If I Ever Recover" (instrumental) | 8:47 |
