= Summer Daze =

Summer Daze may refer to:

- "Summer Daze", a song by the alternative rock group Luscious Jackson on the 1999 album Electric Honey
- Summer Daze EP, 1995 EP by Basement Jaxx
- "Summer Daze", a song by the pop punk group All Time Low on the 2020 album Wake Up, Sunshine
