= Atlantic Jaxx Recordings: A Compilation =

Compilation album by Various artists
- Released: 10 November 1997
- Recorded: 1994–1997
- Genre: Electronica; deep house; UK garage
- Length: 74:39
- Label: Atlantic Jaxx
- Producer: Basement Jaxx; Simon Ratcliffe

Professional ratings
Review scores
Source	Rating
AllMusic	4/5 stars

Atlantic Jaxx Recordings: A Compilation is a compilation of select releases on English electronic music duo Basement Jaxx's Atlantic Jaxx label from 1994 to 1997. Most of the tracks are written or produced by Basement Jaxx, excluding "Belo Horizonti", which is a Basement Jaxx remix of the song by The Heartists.

"Fly Life" was a huge hit throughout the international club scene and a top twenty hit in Basement Jaxx's native Britain.

Atlantic Jaxx Recordings: A Compilation was followed two years later by the first full-length album of original Jaxx material, Remedy.

== Track listing ==
All tracks are written by Basement Jaxx, except where noted

No.	Title	Writer(s)	Length
1.	"Intro" (unlisted)		0:19
2.	"Be Free"		7:04
3.	"Samba Magic"		7:47
4.	"Live Your Life with Me"	Corrina Joseph	6:18
5.	"Fly Life"		6:09
6.	"Eu Nao" (featuring Adrianna Montero)		7:18
7.	"Belo Horizonti" (Brix Edit)	The Heartists	6:27
8.	"Lonely"	Corrina Joseph	6:33
9.	"Set Yo Body Free"		6:59
10.	"Daluma" (vocals by Madelaine Vincent)		6:13
11.	"Grapesoda"	Simon Ratcliffe, prior to forming Basement Jaxx	4:56
12.	"Missing You"	Ronnie Richards	6:20
13.	"Undaground"		4:35
