= Fly Life =

Single by Basement Jaxx

from the album EP3
- Released: 1996
- Recorded: 1995; Atlantic Jaxx Recordings; (Camberwell, England)
- Genre: House; ragga; disco; proto-punk; UK garage
- Length: 6:14 (EP version); 6:41 ("Brix" mix); 4:03 ("Brix" radio edit)
- Label: Atlantic Jaxx; Multiply
- Songwriters: Simon Ratcliffe; Felix Buxton
- Producer: Basement Jaxx

Basement Jaxx singles chronology
"Samba Magic" (1995)	"Fly Life" (1996)	"Red Alert" (1999)

"Fly Life" (often stylised as "Flylife") is a song by English electronic dance music duo Basement Jaxx from their fourth extended play, EP3, released in 1996. The track was largely based on the 1996 single "Live Your Life with Me", which they produced for vocalist Corrina Joseph, their collaborator since 1995 in order to make "proper songs".

It was re-released as a single by Multiply Records on 19 May 1997 with a new mix, featuring added vocals from British reggae artist Glamma Kid. It later went on to become Basement Jaxx's first charting single in the United Kingdom by reaching the top 20 of the UK Singles Chart. Granted moderate success commercially, critically, the song also received very positive reviews from music critics, the ones who highlighted the fusion of the many genres of the track and its handful production.

The song was later included on two compilations from the duo: Atlantic Jaxx Recordings: A Compilation in 1997 and The Singles in 2005 and on various DJ sets, including those by Daft Punk and Fatboy Slim.

== Production ==
In 1995, Virgin Records picked up and distributed Basement Jaxx's first single "Samba Magic". After spending time remixing for Pet Shop Boys, Roger Sanchez and Lil' Mo' Yin Yang, they released their fourth extended play called EP3. A track from it, "Fly Life", is a house song with ragga, disco, proto-punk and UK garage influences. Its basis was "Live Your Life with Me", a single originally performed by vocalist Corrina Joseph in 1998, the singer whom they had been working with since the release of EP2 (1995) for their first attempts at making "proper songs". The duo's re-work of "Live Your Life with Me" added "euphoric synth" and "filtered brass stabs" with long-winded air horn throughout. Generally, Charles Aaron from Spin described the track as a "blaxploitation dubby" while Resident Advisor described it as "a more idiosyncratic, homegrown sound emerged in the edge-of-panic squeal."

== Critical reception ==
"Fly Life" received much acclaim from music critics. Colin Larkin described the track in Encyclopedia of Popular Music as a "club classic" and an "unusual blend of ragga and house." Andy Kellman from AllMusic stated the song, along with their first single "Samba Magic" are the only two examples of why their debut album was so heavily anticipated. Writing for The New Rolling Stone Album Guide, Michaelangelo Matos called the song one of their "definitive mid-'90s club anthems". From the same publication, John Bush also agreed those two were their best tracks from 1994 through 1997, and marked them as his "Track Picks" on their compilation. However, looking at the whole Basement Jaxx's catalogue, Anna Chapman from The Independent stated the "glittered" ragga and disco influences of "Fly Life" seemed to "come out of nowhere." French music magazine Les Inrockuptibles still highly praised it, commenting it was "finely crafted", with "the bass increased tension while the dance rhythm completely nailed on the dance floor." Joseph's vocals were also said to give a "disco aftertaste" to the song.

British publication Mixmag listed "Fly Life" at number 16 on their year-end list "Tunes of 1997" while house music label Defected Records voted the track as the Ibiza nightclub Space anthem of 1997. The "Brix" Mix was later included in Pitchfork's 2010 list of "twenty-five great remixes" of 1990s.

== Release and other appearances ==
"Fly Life" was released as a single by their own record label Atlantic Jaxx and Multiply Records with distribution by The Total Record Company. The single cover features a giraffe, the picture which also appeared at their 1999 show at the Forum in London via a "vast dot-matrix screen".

A few different formats of the single have been released in the United Kingdom and some other countries in Europe, including a CD version which was released in the United Kingdom via Atlantic Jaxx and in Denmark via Smart Records that includes the original mix of the track, a radio edit and an unedited version for the "Brix" mix with remixes from Roni Size, Erick Morillo and Curtis Jones; the UK vinyl single and cassette versions both have the "Brix" and Size's mix, while the vinyl one also added Morillo's and the original mix.

A promotional music video for the version with Glamma King was also released while it became their first charted single by debuting at number 19 on the UK Singles Chart on 31 May 1997. After that, the song fell down to number 41, dropped to number 67 on the week of 14 June and disappeared from the chart.

"Fly Life" later made its appearances on various DJ mixes, including the free mix cassette Beat Up the NME (1997) from music magazine NME which was compiled by British DJ Fatboy Slim; Junior Vasquez's live album Live, Vol. 2 (1998); later on Victor Calderone's mix album called E=VC² (1999); and on the mix album Soul of Man Presents: Y4K: Breakin' in tha House (2004). In 2009, "Fly Life Xtra" appeared on Paul Ritch's DJ set for BBC Radio 1 radio show Essential Mix. The "Brix" mix also made its appearances on the 1999 coming-of-age film Virtual Sexuality and its soundtrack.

== Formats and track listings ==
- UK and Europe maxi CD single
1. "Fly Life" ("Brix" Radio Edit) – 4:03
2. "Fly Life" ("Brix" Mix) – 6:41
3. "Fly Life" (Roni Size "Flyzs" Mix) – 6:09
4. "Fly Life" (Erick "More" Dub) – 7:31
5. "Fly Life" (Cajmere "Green Velvet" Mix) – 7:39
6. "Fly Life" (Original Mix) – 6:33
- UK 12" single
1. "Fly Life" ("Brix" Radio Edit) – 4:03
2. "Fly Life" (Erick "More" Dub) – 7:31
3. "Fly Life" (Roni Size "Flyzs" Mix) – 6:09
4. "Fly Life" (Original Mix) – 6:33
- UK cassette single
1. "Fly Life" ("Brix" Radio Edit) – 4:03
2. "Fly Life" (Roni Size "Flyzs" Mix) – 6:09
- France 12" single
1. "Fly Life" ("Brix" Mix) – 6:41
2. "Fly Life" (Original Mix) – 6:33
3. "Fly Life" (Barefax Mix) – 5:14
- France 12" remixes single
1. "Fly Life" (Cajmere "Green Velvet" Mix) – 7:39
2. "Fly Life" (Roni Size "Flyzs" Mix) – 6:09
3. "Fly Life" (Erick "More" Dub) – 7:31
- International digital and UK vinyl Fly Life Xtra EP
1. "Fly Life Xtra" (Original Mix) – 7:39
2. "Fly Life" (Switch Mix) – 6:09
3. "Fly Life" (Dub 3 By Mr. Dan & Raf Daddy) – 7:31

== Credits and personnel ==
Credits adapted from the CD single liner notes.

- Simon Ratcliffe (credited as "Ratcliffe") – producer, songwriter
- Felix Buxton (credited as "Felix B") – producer, songwriter
- Glamma Kid – vocals
- Corrina Joseph – vocals
- Alexia Cox – designer

== Charts ==
Chart performance for "Fly Life"
Chart (1997)	Peak position
Scottish Singles Sales (Official Charts)	24
UK Singles (Official Charts)	19
UK Dance (Official Charts)	3
