= A Compilation =

A Compilation may refer to:

- A Compilation (Natalie MacMaster album)
- Atlantic Jaxx Recordings: A Compilation
