= Camberwell (disambiguation) =

Camberwell is a district of London, England.

Camberwell may also refer to:

- Camberwell, New South Wales, Australia
- Camberwell, Victoria, Australia
  - City of Camberwell, a former local government area that existed before the state's 1994 amalgamations.
  - Camberwell railway station, Melbourne
- Metropolitan Borough of Camberwell, London, England
- Camberwell (EP), by Basement Jaxx
- Camberwell beauty (Nymphalis antiopa), a butterfly from the family Nymphalidae
