= Hey U =

Single by Basement Jaxx

from the album Crazy Itch Radio
- Released: 5 March 2007
- Recorded: 2006
- Genre: House; Balkan brass
- Length: 4:54
- Label: XL
- Songwriters: Simon Ratcliffe; Felix Buxton; Adrian Sical; Henry Ernst
- Producer: Basement Jaxx

Basement Jaxx singles chronology
"Take Me Back to Your House" (2006)	"Hey U" (2007)	"Make Me Sweat" (2007)

"Hey U" is a song recorded by the English electronic music duo Basement Jaxx for their fourth studio album, Crazy Itch Radio (2006). An extended play featuring remixes of the song was released in March 2007 under XL Recordings, as the third promotional release from the album. It did not chart. The song features vocals from the Swedish pop singer Robyn.

== Composition ==
"Hey U" is four minutes and 54 seconds long. Musically, it is a dance song that prominently samples the horns from "Asfalt Tango", by the Balkan brass band Fanfare Ciocărlia. The song contains elements of Romani music, Balkan music and klezmer. It features vocals from the Swedish singer Robyn. The song also features a chorus of children from Nanthomba Orphan School in Malawi.

In 2011, the song was reworked by Felix Buxton and Jules Buckley in orchestral form on the collaborative album Basement Jaxx vs. Metropole Orkest. Reviewing the album for The Independent, Andy Gill described this version as a "riot of cosmopolitan eclecticism". MusicOMH's Chris White called it an "eclectic mix of the Lambada, James Bond themes and Balkan instrumentation," and the highlight of the album's middle section.

== Critical reception ==
The track received generally positive critical reception. Jess Harvell from Pitchfork singled out the song as the album's standout track. The Guardian's John Burgess said that the song "fizzes powerfully", and while the album's "daft interludes and kitchen-sink production sound too familiar, Crazy Itch Radio can still surprise - particularly on Hey U." Michael Hubbard of musicOMH called it "a riotously inventive production that cries out to be played over and over again." Kitty Empire of The Observer reacted less positively to the song, stating that it took the duo's "dalliance with Balkan-derived party music too far".

== Track listing ==
No.	Title	Length
1.	"Hey U" (Switch & Sinden Remix)	5:29
2.	"Hey U" (Jaxx Accordian Mix)	5:35
3.	"Hey U" (High Contrast Remix)	5:41

== Credits and personnel ==
Credits adapted from the liner notes of Crazy Itch Radio and BMI.

Recording and management

- Mixed by Basement Jaxx and Jason Boshoff.
- Mastered by Geoff Pesche at Abbey Road Studios.
- Published by Universal Music and Piranha Musikverlag.
- Robyn appears courtesy of Konichiwa Records.
- Contains elements of "Asfalt Tango" performed by Fanfare Ciocărlia, licensed courtesy of Piranha Musik.

Personnel

- Felix Buxton – mixing, production, songwriting
- Simon Ratcliffe – mixing, production, songwriting
- Adrian Sical – songwriting
- Henry Ernst – songwriting
- Robyn – vocals
- Dandino Jhet – backing vocals
- Linda Lewis – backing vocals
- Marcus J. Thomas – backing vocals
- Serguei Pachnine – accordion, backing vocals
- Nanthomba Orphan School – vocals
