= Back 2 the Wild =

Single by Basement Jaxx

from the album Junto
- Released: 12 April 2013
- Genre: House
- Length: 4:12
- Label: 37 Adventures
- Songwriters: Simon Ratcliffe; Felix Buxton
- Producer: Basement Jaxx

Basement Jaxx singles chronology
"Raindrops (Jaxx Club Boot)" (2011)	"Back 2 the Wild" (2013)	"What a Difference Your Love Makes" (2013)

"Back 2 the Wild" is a song by English electronic music duo Basement Jaxx, released on 12 April 2013, via London-based independent label 37 Adventures. The song was written and produced by group members Simon Ratcliffe and Felix Buxton while Korean artists Baby Chay and Miss Emma Lee contributed the vocals. At the time of the release, "Back 2 the Wild" was intended to be the lead single of their then-upcoming seventh studio album Music, but the idea was eventually scrapped. The group instead released Junto (2014), whose deluxe edition features the song's Korean version and remixes.

Upon its release, "Back 2 the Wild" received critical acclaim from music critics. Mat Maitland and Natalia Stuyk directed its accompanied music video. Female idol group Team Syachihoko was chosen to perform the song's Japanese version released in May 2015. MTV Video Music Awards Japan nominated the version's live performance video for Best Collaboration that same year.

== Background and composition ==
The song made its premiere on BBC Radio 1 show Annie Mac.

After the release, the band's publicist announced more single releases to follow and a possible of a new studio album.

"'Back 2 the Wild' we did as kind of house track to fit in with the world," Buxton said, "and everyone found it really left field and everyone said, 'God it’s really kind of quirky and arty and weird,' and we were like ‘That’s us trying to do something straightforward!’ So in a way, it's great, and it goes down so well live, but it ended up falling a bit more into the 'arty' bracket. I didn't mind at all: that's great for me."

The duo chose Japanese girl group Team Syachihoko to perform the track's Japanese version after having seen a video of them performing. The version was released as a digital single and 12-inch single on 18 May 2015. During the duo's tour in Japan, both performed the song live. The group also interviewed them backstage, their segment was later aired on MTV81 in June.

== Critical response ==
Tom Breihan of Stereogum praised the song for being "frantic and shamelessly, goofily fun as ever."

The song was described by Evan Sawdey from PopMatters as "an otherworldly banger that seemed to exist on the more extreme planes of maximalist dance music".

== Music video ==
The music video for the song was directed by Basement Jaxx's long-time collaborator Mat Maitland with additional directorial work from Natalia Stuyk. It was said to feature Maitland's signature collage style of design along with specially made items by French hair stylist-fashion designer Charlie Le Mindu and make-up artist Isamaya Ffrench. Maitland also shot the single's cover which similarly uses a headpiece from Le Mindu.

It was choreographed by Masumi Saito.

Nicole James from Fuse named her article "WTF is Going On in Basement Jaxx's "Back 2 the Wild" Video?" and stated: "Cavewomen and monkeys and flying flowers, oh my. The British electro-dance group is back, and trying to make junglepunk a thing. We think it's working."

Consequence of Sound cited Fruitopia commercials as the inspiration for the video.

This version was later nominated for Best Collaboration at the 2015 MTV Video Music Awards Japan.

Tom Breihan of Stereogum said the video doesn’t disappoint due to the group's long history of "brain-wrecking" music videos. "It’s a frantic collage of kitschy jungle tropes, filtered through a hyperactive color scheme, with enough strobe-flashing that it might need an epilepsy warning," Breihan described. Similarly, Pitchfork's contributor Carrie Battan called the video "eye-popping" and "it's every bit as vibrant as the title and sound of the song would imply: zany safari outfits, psychedelic nature excursions, bright color overload, the works."

== Track listings and formats ==
12" single

1. "What a Difference Your Love Makes" (Jaxx Extended Mix) – 6:00
2. "What a Difference Your Love Makes" (Huxley Remix) – 6:13
3. "What a Difference Your Love Makes" (Miguel Campbell Remix) – 5:54
4. "Back 2 the Wild" (Jaxx Extended Mix) – 9:10
5. "Back 2 the Wild" (Gorgon City Remix) – 6:20

12" limited edition single

1. "Back 2 the Wild" (Japanese Version) – 4:48
2. "Back 2 the Wild" (Single Edit Instrumental) – 4:13

Digital download #1

1. "Back 2 the Wild" – 4:12

Digital download #2

1. "Back 2 The Wild" (Japanese Version)

Digital download remixes EP

1. "Back 2 the Wild" – 4:12
2. "Back 2 the Wild" (Jaxx Extended Mix) – 9:10
3. "Back 2 the Wild" (Gorgon Jaxx Dub) – 6:46
4. "Back 2 the Wild" (Gorgon City Remix) – 6:20
5. "Back 2 the Wild" (Jaxx Casadub) – 6:36
6. "Back 2 the Wild" (Jaxx Work-A-Dub) – 6:42
