= Never Say Never (Basement Jaxx song) =

Single by Basement Jaxx featuring ETML

from the album Junto
- Released: 27 June 2014
- Genre: Disco-house; R&B pop
- Length: 4:23
- Label: PIAS; Atlantic Jaxx
- Songwriters: Simon Ratcliffe; Felix Buxton; Elliot Marshall
- Producer: Basement Jaxx

Basement Jaxx singles chronology
"Mermaid of Salinas" (2014)	"Never Say Never" (2014)	"Galactical" (2014)

ETML singles chronology
"Bind Me" (2013)	"Never Say Never" (2014)

Music video
- "Never Say Never" on YouTube

"Never Say Never" is a song by the British electronic music duo Basement Jaxx. Featuring vocals from Elliot Marshall (credited under the stage name "ETML"), it was written by Simon Ratcliffe, Felix Buxton and Marshall. A soulful disco-house, R&B pop song, it was compared to the works of artists including Calvin Harris, SBTRKT, and Womack & Womack, and labels such as Ministry of Sound and West End Records. It was released on 27 June 2014, as a single off their 2014 album Junto. An accompanying music video premiered on 21 July. Remixes by Tiësto and MOTi, Gotsome Bring It Back, Wayward and Mark Knight were also issued, as well as an extended mix of the original song.

"Never Say Never" was well received by critics. It was nominated for Best Dance/Electronic Recording at the 57th Annual Grammy Awards. In the group's home country, it reached number 18 on the UK Indie Chart. Elsewhere, it became the duo's fourth track to top the American Billboard Hot Dance Club Songs chart, and appeared on record charts in Australia, Belgium and Japan.

== Production and composition ==
"Never Say Never" was written by Simon Ratcliffe, Felix Buxton and Elliot Marshall. It was produced by the former two, with Baunz handling co-production. In addition to the lead vocals from Marshall (who is credited under "ETML"), the track also features backing vocals from Yzabel, as well as kids chorus vocals from Amara Charles, Kiarah and Shamouy Mills-Foster. It is a soulful mid-tempo disco-house R&B pop song. Introduced with "deceptively cinematic strings", "dub-leaning" bass and drums and a "vintage, slightly dusty" piano are also present in the arrangement. Tom Breihan of Stereogum noted it to be more relaxed and less cartoonish than many of Basement Jaxx's other songs. Billboard staff said that the song blends disco, house and R&B, with the melody and lyrics being pop. John Daniel Bull, in his review for The Line of Best Fit, said it "combines bolshie beats with '90s house keys".

Benjamin Aspray, a writer for PopMatters, compared it to records released by Ministry of Sound and West End Records. Adam Workman, in his review for the Abu Dhabi newspaper The National, noted it to be in the style of Calvin Harris, while Sean Thomas of Drowned in Sound and entertainment.ie's Rory Cashin described it as a SBTRKTy track. The 405 author Lyle Bignon said the song "take[s] us back to a warehouse somewhere in Brixton circa 1998, rushing hard and loving the vibe along with another five hundred party heads." Jon O'Brien of Mimo compared the melody of "Never Say Never" to "Teardrops" by Womack & Womack. James West of DIY compared ETML to "that already-fiercely-competitive boyish soul futurist throne", with singers such as Sam Smith and John Newman. Billboard similarly described ETML's performance as being in a "soulful Sam Smith-style".

== Release ==
The original mix of "Never Say Never" was first released on 27 June 2014. It was released as a single from their sixth studio album Junto (2014), where it is its fourth track. An accompanying music video, written and directed by Saman Kesh, premiered on 21 July 2014. In the video, Japanese scientists make a robot that can twerk. Tiësto's remix with MOTi was released on 22 July. The original track came out with the Gotsome Bring It Back and Wayward remixes in digital stores on 15 August. On 2 September, Mart Knight's remix of the song was released.

== Critical reception ==
"Never Say Never" earned positive reviews from critics, with praise going towards Basement Jaxx's signature sound. Angus Fitz-Bugden of Renowned for Sound praised the "vulnerable sensuality" of ETML's vocal performance and wrote that the duo kept their signature sound without sounding obsolete. West opined it was "undeniably an instantly-rousing summer smash in waiting", in spite of ETML's soul-like vocals. Writing for musicOMH, Larry Day described it as "big, stadium-y" while presenting a "lovely R&B vocal line". Spin writer Colin Stutz highlighted the hook of the song that was "ripe for raving", and described it as "just plain blissful". He also praised the group's maturity present in the song. Chris Coplan of Consequence of Sound wrote that "one could easily enjoy this ditty with a nice afternoon mocaccino and some crackers", while NME's called it "proof that hooky house doesn't have to be totally cheesy". On the more mixed side, Nate Patrin of Pitchfork called the titular chorus of "Never Say Never" "relatively lacking in that giddy sense of control loss".

On 7 July 2014, Digital Spy staff members Lewis Corner and Amy Davidson named "Never Say Never" one of the "10 tracks you need to hear" At the 57th Annual Grammy Awards in 2015, "Never Say Never" received a nomination for the Best Dance/Electronic Recording category, but it lost to Clean Bandit's "Rather Be".

== Chart performance ==
On the UK Indie Chart, "Never Say Never" peaked at number 18. It reached number seven and 14 on the Belgian Ultratip chart, and also 24 and 20 on the dance chart, in Flanders and Wallonia respectively. In the United States, it topped the Billboard Hot Dance Club Songs chart. It was the duo's fourth number one on the chart, and their first since "Bingo Bango" in July 2000. It was also in the top 20 of the Dance/Electronic Songs chart, where it peaked at number 18. In Japan, it had a peak of number 68 on the Japan Hot 100, and was also number ten on the Overseas chart. The single packaged with Mark Knight, Got Some, Wayward and instrumental mixes of the song reached number 15 on the Australian ARIA club chart.

== Personnel ==
Credits are adapted from liner notes of Junto.

- Basement Jaxx – songwriting, production
- ETML – songwriting, vocals
- Baunz – co-production
- Alex Evans, Duncan F. Brown – mixing
- Yzabel – background vocals
- Amara Charles, Kiarah, Shamouy Mills-Foster – kids chorus vocals

== Charts ==
=== Weekly charts ===
Chart (2014)	Peak position
Australia Club (ARIA)	15
Belgium (Ultratip Bubbling Under Flanders)	14
Belgium Dance (Ultratop Flanders)	24
Belgium (Ultratip Bubbling Under Wallonia)	7
Belgium Dance (Ultratop Wallonia)	20
Japan Hot 100 (Billboard)	68
Japan International Songs (Hot Overseas)	10
UK Indie (OCC)	18
US Hot Dance/Electronic Songs (Billboard)	18
US Dance Club Songs (Billboard)	1

=== Year-end charts ===
Chart (2014)	Position
US Dance Club Songs (Billboard)	1
US Hot Dance/Electronic Songs (Billboard)	67

== Release history ==
Release history and formats for "Never Say Never"
Country	Date	Version	Format	Label	Ref.
Various	27 June 2014	Original version	Digital download; streaming	Atlantic Jaxx	
United States	22 July 2014	Tiësto and MOTi Remix	Digital download; streaming	Atlantic Jaxx	
United Kingdom	28 July 2014	Tiësto and MOTi Remix	Digital download; streaming	Atlantic Jaxx	
United Kingdom	15 August 2014	Extended mix; Gotsome Bring It Back; Wayward remix	Digital download; streaming	Atlantic Jaxx	
United States	19 August 2014	Original version; Gotsome Bring It Back; Wayward remix	Digital download; streaming	Atlantic Jaxx	
United States	2 September 2014	Mark Knight Remix	Digital download; streaming	Atlantic Jaxx	
