= George IV, Brixton =

Coordinates: 51°27′8″N 0°7′18″W

George IV, Brixton, UK
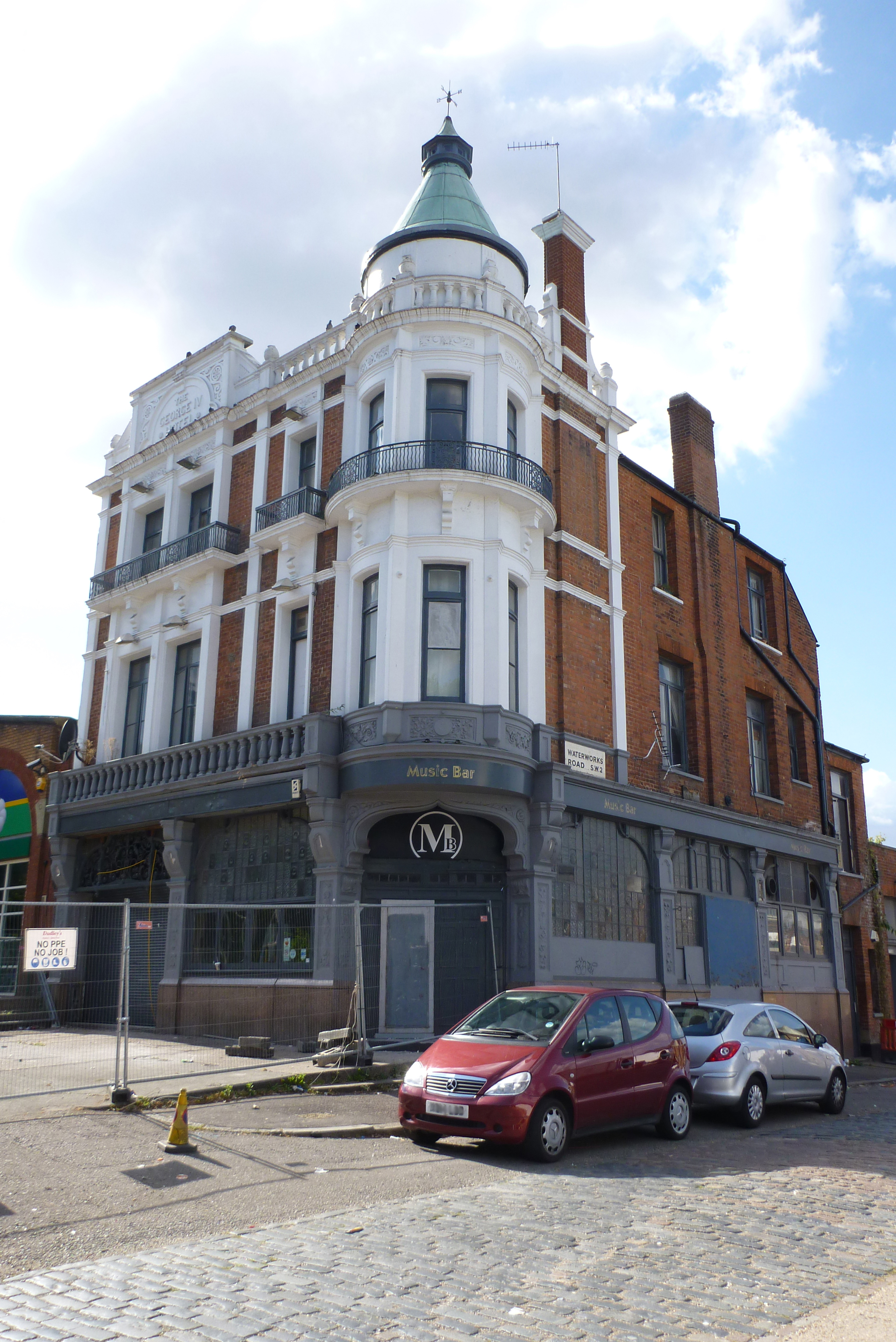
- George IV in September 2012
- Interactive map of the George IV, Brixton, UK area

General information
- Location: Brixton; London, SW2; United Kingdom

The George IV (also called George Four) was a public house and concert and dance venue at 144 Brixton Hill, in Brixton, London. At the junction with Waterworks Road, the venue in 2007 became the Southside Bar and later the Music Bar. Following its closure in 2012, it became a branch of Tesco.

== History ==
The George IV is marked on Stanford's 1864 map; the pub can be seen to the right of the Lambeth Water Works and Female Convict Prison on Brixton Hill at the junction with George Place. It does not appear on Whitbread's 1865 map, although the White Horse to the north is marked. An Ordnance Survey 1:2,500 map from 1874-75 shows the location of the George IV marked with the letters 'PH'. Bartholemew's 1908 map did not mark public houses, but it showed the road to the side of the pub as Waterworks Road.

The 1901 census showed 144 Brixton Hill as The Telegraph public house. That could have been a clerical error during the census data's transcription - the same census also documented the existence of a Telegraph public house at 228 Brixton Hill. The 1901 census data list a licensed victualler, his wife, mother, three sons, daughter and niece as the occupiers of 144 Brixton Hill. There were also four servants: a housemaid, two barmen and a cook. The 1911 census showed 144 Brixton Hill as the George IV, with the same head of household as in 1901, and a total of 11 people living in the property.

The George IV continued as a pub until 2006. In May 2007, the venue re-opened as a wine bar.

In mid-2012, the Tesco supermarket chain revealed that it planned to open a “convenience store” format Tesco Express store on the site. The plan was not welcomed, with the area's MP Chuka Umunna expressing concern over its impact on local businesses, jobs and the character of the area. The pub became a Tesco in 2013.

== Layout ==
During the early 2000s, the George IV had three main areas: a patio garden at the front, with around ten pub table-benches; a front room with a traditional, oval-shaped wooden bar in the centre; and a room at the back with DJ decks, huge speakers, and a dry-ice machine.

Around 2001, a wooden fence was erected around the front patio garden, blocking views to and from the road.

In early 2003, the traditional wooden bar was demolished to leave a bare front room with a modern-type bar down one side.

== Events ==
The Basement Jaxx club night was held in the rear at the George IV from 1994, amongst other venues. Basement Jaxx attribute a significant part of their style to their formative times at the George IV; Simon Ratcliffe explained that the venue is "where our chaos comes from... there was always feedback, records jumping, things going wrong—but people cheered 'cause there was a real vibe; it wasn't clinical".

During the early half of the 2000s, there were regular club events at the George IV, on Thursday, Friday and Saturday nights, and on Saturday and Sunday during the day.
