= Take Me Back to Your House =

2006 single by Basement Jaxx

Single by Basement Jaxx

from the album Crazy Itch Radio
- B-side: "Lollipop"
- Released: 30 October 2006
- Genre: House
- Length: 5:08 (album version); 3:48 (radio edit)
- Label: XL
- Songwriters: Simon Ratcliffe; Felix Buxton; Sorbara
- Producer: Basement Jaxx

Basement Jaxx singles chronology
"Hush Boy" (2006)	"Take Me Back to Your House" (2006)	"Hey U" (2007)

Martina Sorbara singles chronology
"Take Me Back to Your House" (2006)	"Fire in Your New Shoes" (2010)

"Take Me Back to Your House" is a song by English electronic music duo Basement Jaxx with Martina Sorbara on vocals. It was released as the second single from their fourth studio album, Crazy Itch Radio (2006), by XL Recordings. The track reached number 42 on the UK Singles Chart following its release in October 2006.

== Composition ==
The Independent described the track as an uptempo banjo house "stomper".

== Critical reception ==
The Independent called the track "deliriously catchy." Robert Christgau chose the song as one of his favorite tracks from the album.

== Music video ==
The music video for the song was directed by Dougal Wilson. The video features Martina Sorbara and high stepping Cossacks and dancing bears. The Independent called the video "remarkable."

== Charts ==
=== Weekly charts ===
Weekly chart performance for "Take Me Back to Your House"
Chart (2006–2007)	Peak position
Australia (ARIA)	71
Belgium (Ultratip Bubbling Under Flanders)	3
Czech Republic Airplay (ČNS IFPI)	85
Finland (Suomen virallinen lista)	10
Hungary (Dance Top 40)	40
Ireland (IRMA)	48
Netherlands (Single Top 100)	99
Russia Airplay (TopHit)	19
Scotland Singles (Official Charts)	37
UK Singles (Official Charts)	42
UK Dance (Official Charts)	12
UK Indie (Official Charts)	4

=== Year-end charts ===
Year-end chart performance for "Take Me Back to Your House"
Chart (2006)	Position
Russia Airplay (TopHit)	181

== Release history ==
Release history and formats for "Take Me Back to Your House"
Region	Date	Format(s)	Label(s)	Ref.
United Kingdom	30 October 2006	CD	XL	
Australia	20 November 2006	12-inch vinyl; CD	XL	
