= Feelings Gone =

Single by Basement Jaxx featuring Sam Sparro

from the album Scars
- Released: 8 September 2009
- Recorded: 2009
- Genre: Dance-pop
- Length: 3:39
- Label: XL; Interscope
- Songwriter(s): Simon Ratcliffe; Felix Buxton
- Producer(s): Basement Jaxx

Basement Jaxx singles chronology
"Raindrops" (2009)	"Feelings Gone" (2009)	"Dracula" (2010)

Sam Sparro singles chronology
"Pocket" (2008)	"Feelings Gone" (2009)	"Pink Cloud" (2010)

"Feelings Gone" is a song by British electronic music duo Basement Jaxx. It was released on 8 September 2009 as the second single from their fifth studio album, Scars. It was digitally released on 8 September in the United States and was released in the United Kingdom on 21 September 2009. The song features vocals from the Australian-born singer-songwriter Sam Sparro.

== Music video ==
The music video for the song was directed by Andy Soup and released on 28 August 2009. It has a futuristic theme.

== Critical reception ==
Digital Spy gave the song three stars, describing it as "a slice of fairly unremarkable dance-pop" and commented on Sam Sparro's vocals as "quirky enough to keep things interesting as he soars, squeaks and squalls his way through this track."

== Release history ==
Region	Date	Label
United States	8 September 2009	Ultra Records
Australia	20 September 2009	XL Recordings
United Kingdom	21 September 2009	XL Recordings
