= Scars (Basement Jaxx album) =

Studio album by Basement Jaxx
- Released: 21 September 2009
- Recorded: 2008–09
- Length: 50:58
- Label: XL/Ultra
- Producers: Simon Ratcliffe; Felix Buxton

Basement Jaxx chronology
Crazy Itch Radio (2006)	Scars (2009)	Zephyr (2009)

Singles from Scars
- 1. "Raindrops" Released: 22 June 2009; 2. "Feelings Gone" Released: 8 September 2009; 3. "My Turn" Released: 14 December 2009

Scars is the fifth studio album by English electronic music duo Basement Jaxx. It was released in September 2009 by record labels XL, Ultra and Interscope. Three singles were released from the album: "Raindrops", "Feelings Gone" and "My Turn".

== Content ==
The track "Twerk" features lyrics adapted from Michael Sembello's song "Maniac".

Buxton recalls their time collaborating with Yoko Ono: "[She] was very cool. We were told she would arrive bang on time and leave exactly when she was supposed to. And she did. She's very disciplined. The weird thing working with her, I thought she'd come in being all Yoko Ono and she came and asked 'What do you want me to say or sing?' Luckily I'd written some surreal poem and said, 'You could read this along to the music.'"

In an interview, Felix Buxton stated that the album Scars were all the things that the band had been through emotionally and physically. Felix told Rolling Stone Australia they named the album after he was mugged for his bicycle in Brixton, London in 2008. He revealed: "I wasn't badly hurt, but it scared me. It's probably one of the scariest moments of my life. Scars are the things that stay with you and that incident definitely gave me one."

== Release ==
Scars was preceded by the release of two singles from the album: "Raindrops", released on 22 June 2009, and "Feelings Gone", on 8 September.

Scars was released on 21 September 2009 by record labels XL, Ultra and Interscope. One final single was released: "My Turn", on 14 December.

The songs "Raindrops" and "My Turn" were included in the 2010 series of concerts with Metropole Orkest which led to the 2011 album Basement Jaxx vs. Metropole Orkest.

The single, "Saga" featuring Santigold appeared as soundtrack in EA Sports game, 2010 FIFA World Cup South Africa.

== Critical reception ==
Professional ratings
Aggregate scores
Source	Rating
Metacritic	69/100
Review scores
Source	Rating
AllMusic	3.5/5 stars
Consequence of Sound	4/5 stars
Drowned in Sound	7/10
MusicOMH	4/5 stars
The Observer	3/5 stars
Pitchfork	7.2/10
PopMatters	7/10
Slant Magazine	2.5/5 stars
Spin	7/10
URB	4.5/5 stars

The album was given a score of 69 out of 100 from Metacritic based on 19 reviews, a much lower score than their first three albums. URB wrote: "if you're wondering what electronic music is missing, look no further: Scars should serve as a reminder (if you needed one) that Basement Jaxx are an essential piece of the puzzle."

David Jeffries of AllMusic wrote: "there's nothing here you could write off as true filler, but that perfect flow that made their masterpieces so thrilling is missing", but ended by calling it "a worthwhile throwback to the freak attitude that kicked off their career over a decade earlier." Matthew Perpetua of Pitchfork gave the album a rating of 7.2 out of ten and called the album "evidence of true artistic growth", but noted that "[the] successes share space with creative cul-de-sacs and uninspired genre exercises". PopMatters' Evan Sawdey wrote that "though the Jaxx will continue to rack up left-field hits and critical acclaim for years to come, both Scars and Crazy Itch Radio show that the group's innovative streak has come to an end." He noted that "though they can still produce utterly awe-inspiring tracks now and then (could 'Raindrops' been created by anyone else but the Jaxx?), it appears that Basement Jaxx are struggling under the pressure to come up with another stone-cold masterpiece". In his Consumer Guide, Robert Christgau gave the album a two-star honorable mention and stated that it's "As good as their cameos as usual, led by Yo Majesty, Yoko, and Ms. Paloma Faith, who is clearly worthy of domestic consumption", while picking out two songs from the album, "Twerk" and "Day of the Sunflowers (We March On)".

== Track listing ==
No.	Title	Length
1.	"Scars" (featuring Kelis, Meleka and Chipmunk)	4:15
2.	"Raindrops"	4:10
3.	"She's No Good" (featuring Eli "Paperboy" Reed)	3:26
4.	"Saga" (featuring Santigold)	2:42
5.	"Feelings Gone" (featuring Sam Sparro)	3:42
6.	"My Turn" (featuring Lightspeed Champion)	4:52
7.	"A Possibility" (featuring Amp Fiddler)	2:45
8.	"Twerk" (featuring Yo! Majesty)	3:30
9.	"Day of the Sunflowers (We March On)" (featuring Yoko Ono)	5:59
10.	"What's a Girl Gotta Do" (featuring Paloma Faith)	4:04
11.	"Stay Close" (featuring Lisa Kekaula)	3:01
12.	"Distractionz" (featuring Jose Hendrix)	5:03
13.	"Gimme Somethin' True" (featuring José James)	5:29

Japanese import / iTunes bonus tracks
No.	Title	Length
14.	"One More Chance" (featuring Lil Louis)	4:50

Additional Japanese import bonus track
No.	Title	Length
15.	"Feelings Gone (Alternate Version)" (featuring Sam Sparro)	3:23

Additional US iTunes bonus tracks
No.	Title	Length
15.	"Wheel N' Stop (Planet 3 Version)" (featuring Serocee)	4:22
16.	"Raindrops (Funkagenda and Paul Thomas Re-Dux)"	7:44

Amazon.com bonus tracks
No.	Title	Length
14.	"Feelings Gone (Joachim Garraud Remix)" (remix by Joachim Garraud; featuring Sam Sparro)	8:39
15.	"Raindrops (Under New Management Remix)"	6:09

Amazon.co.uk bonus track
No.	Title	Length
14.	"Feelings Gone (Rusko's Stadium Rock Remix)" (remix by Rusko; featuring Sam Sparro)	5:15

== Chart performance ==
Chart (2009)	Peak position
Australian Albums (ARIA)	76
Australian Dance Albums (ARIA)	23
Belgian Albums (Ultratop Flanders)	41
Belgian Alternative Albums (Ultratop Flanders)	19
Belgian Albums (Ultratop Wallonia)	92
Dutch Albums (Album Top 100)	84
Irish Albums (IRMA)	89
UK Albums (Official Charts)	37
UK Dance Albums (Official Charts)	2
UK Independent Albums (Official Charts)	5
US Billboard 200	173
US Top Dance Albums (Billboard)	10
US Independent Albums (Billboard)	33
US Heatseekers Albums (Billboard)	9

== Release history ==
Region	Date	Label
United Kingdom	20 September 2009 (Digital); 21 September 2009 (Physical)	XL Recordings
Australia	20 September 2009	XL Recordings
Canada	22 September 2009	Ultra Music
United States	6 October 2009	Ultra Music
