= Junto (album) =

Studio album by Basement Jaxx
- Released: 25 August 2014
- Length: 52:22
- Labels: Atlantic Jaxx; PIAS
- Producer: Basement Jaxx

Basement Jaxx chronology
Zephyr (2009)	Junto (2014)

Singles from Junto
- 1. "Unicorn" Released: 19 May 2014; 2. "Mermaid of Salinas" Released: 27 June 2014; 3. "Never Say Never" Released: 27 June 2014; 4. "Galactical" Released: 13 August 2014; 5. "Rock This Road" Released: 15 December 2014

Junto is the seventh studio album by English electronic music duo Basement Jaxx, released in August 2014 by record labels Atlantic Jaxx and PIAS. It is the duo's first full-length album since Zephyr in 2009, and was announced on 19 May 2014. The title is taken from the song "Power to the People". The album sees a departure from the dark tone of their previous album Zephyr.

The album earned mostly positive reviews upon release, holding an aggregate 71 out of 100 on Metacritic. It reached into the top 30 of the UK Albums Chart, among charting in Australia, Belgium, Ireland, Japan, South Korea and on the United States Billboard charts. Junto spawned five singles, which were "Back 2 the Wild", "What a Difference Your Love Makes", "Unicorn", "Never Say Never" and "Galactical", with "Never Say Never" being a topper of the US Hot Dance Club Songs chart.

== Composition ==
Simon Ratcliffe claimed that they were going for a positive, bright, uplifting and "sort of hopeful" feel with Junto, departing from the darker tone they had on their previous record Zephyr. He reasoned that:

"We were feeling a bit claustrophobic somehow. We had a break. We did a couple of movie scores and some other things—which was really healthy. We had an orchestral performance of our music in Europe and London. There were solo projects. It was good. In the studios where we recorded Junto, there were windows and a view of the city and sky. We felt a bit energized. The general musical landscape has shifted, and it's come back around to where we were twenty years ago in a way. We felt comfortable in the world so we thought, "Let's just have some fun and make something we can DJ to start". It'd been a while since we were making tracks we actually wanted to play out. That was important. They're tracks our friends can put on at a barbecue. It's feel-good and sunny."

== Track information ==
"Power to the People" took two years to make. The track includes backing vocals from audiences at their December 2013 UK Tour. Most of the orchestral instruments were recorded in the beginning of 2014, with the Recycled Orchestra of Cateura, in Paraguay. Basement Jaxx have stated they also tried doing other types of the song, including a funk version and an EDM version.

A music video for "What a Difference Your Love Makes", directed by Damian Weilers, was filmed in the township of Alexandra in Johannesburg, South Africa and involves Pantsula dancers. It was released on 9 August 2013.

"Never Say Never", the fourth track went to number one on the US dance club play chart. The music video, about a twerking robot, was widely received and received over 2 million views in its first week of release.

"Buffalo", the eighth song, initially began as a jungle track, with trap elements later added. In obtaining a vocalist, he contacted The Count & Sinden member Graeme Sinden two weeks before the album was finished. Sinden had emailed vocal parts by Mykki Blanco for him to use in the song. Basement Jaxx claimed Blanco was also supposed to send more vocal stuff to them as well, but he never met the group and "disappeared into the desert."

"Sneakin' Toronto", the tenth track, came from a two-day session with DJ Sneak.

Track twelve, "Mermaid of Salinas" was one of the first songs done for the album. Work on it began circa 2012, when Andrea Terrano, a classical and flamenco guitarist, wrote the melody of the vocal refrain, which he presented to the duo in their old studio. He said that "What he played us was very much like a Latin coffee bar thing" and "decided to give it the Jaxx treatment." When coming up with lyrical themes, they thought of writing them based on a real story: According to Ratcliffe, they used this: "Andrea was in Ibiza on holiday. He had just broken up with someone, and he was feeling a bit blue. He was with Felix and a group of people. He disappeared for a while, and he came back an hour later with this smile on his face. Felix was like, "Where have you been? What have you been up to?" It turned out he had gone paddling in the sea and he got talking to a lady. They were chatting, and they went out further in the sea together. They ended up staying out there and, before they knew it, they were making love in the sea. They came out and said, "Goodbye". That was that! Salinas is a very well-known beach on the island of Ibiza. That's a true story!"

Junto ends with "Love Is At Your Side", a song Ratcliffe wrote for his daughter. He described it as "a song from a father to his daughter" and the vocal melody as "almost country", which singer Sam Brooks "suited it perfectly."

== Title ==
Junto is named after the song "Power to the People". Simon Ratcliffe said the album was titled Junto, because the duo "wanted a title to sum up the spirit of the album, and in English all the words we came up with seemed really kind of dull or insipid." Buxton said that the name "makes people think a bit further and togetherness is about putting yourself 'over there' and seeing how it could be from a different position." Initially, they planned to name the record make.believe, but it was changed after a friend told them that Sony was using those same words (and punctuation) to sell electronics. They also planned to use other titles, including One and Unicorn.

== Release ==
Junto was released on 25 August 2014 by record labels Atlantic Jaxx and PIAS.

=== Commercial performance ===
In Europe, Junto entered the UK Albums Chart at number 30, and it became Basement Jaxx's seventh top 40 album in the United Kingdom. It also debuted within the top ten of the country's Dance and Independent Albums charts, at number three and seven respectively. In Ireland, it opened at number 65 on the IRMA albums chart, and ten on the Indie chart. It also reached 72 and 105 on the Ultratop Belgian Flanders and Wallonia chart, respectively. In other continents, Junto reached number 168 on the United States Billboard 200, as well as five on the Dance/Electronic Albums chart, 28 on the Independent Albums chart, and four on the Top Heatseekers chart. It was Basement Jaxx's fifth top ten Dance/Electronic albums hit, selling 2,000 units in its first week, according to the Nielsen SoundScan. On the Australian ARIA albums chart, it debuted at number 98, becoming the duo's seventh appearance in the top 100 of the chart, and also reached into the top ten of the dance albums chart at number nine. In Japan, it peaked at number 52 on the Oricon chart.

== Critical reception ==
Professional ratings
Aggregate scores
Source	Rating
AnyDecentMusic?	6.5/10
Metacritic	71/100
Review scores
Source	Rating
AllMusic	4/5 stars
Clash	7/10
Drowned in Sound	7/10
The Los Angeles Times	3.5/4 stars
Pitchfork	6.5/10
Paste	8.4/10
NME	7/10
PopMatters	7/10
Rolling Stone	3.5/5 stars
Slant Magazine	3/5 stars

Upon release, Junto earned positive response from music critics. As of September 2014, the album holds an aggregate score of 71 out of 100, indicating "generally favorable reviews", based on 27 critics.

In her four-star review for AllMusic, Heather Phares wrote that "Even if Junto isn't quite as brilliant as Basement Jaxx's early EPs or nearly flawless first three albums, it doesn't sound irrelevant or like the duo is chasing after past glories either -- instead, it's some of their most exciting music in quite a while." Randell Roberts of The Los Angeles Times gave it three-and-a-half stars out of four, saying that "It's hard to believe it's been 15 years [since their first album Remedy], both because [Basement Jaxx] still sound great". Paste Magazine's Robert Ham, who rated it an 8.4 out of ten, opined that "If they’re trying to replicate the excess that sometimes comes with a night out, they’ve succeeded grandly. For home listening, on the other hand, it feels like overindulgence." Writing for Clash, Matt Oliver gave a score of seven out of ten, praising the world music elements which made "it a classic Jaxx party." He assumed the album would "come in for less fanfare than Basement Jaxx’s hit-laden past – but, for the sake of solidity across the board, it’s okay that this seventh album has no obvious breakout or festival showstopper." In a PopMatters review, Benjamin Aspray gave a verdict that while "Junto isn’t an unqualified success, and might not impress any outer-space musicologists anytime soon", it did "show us Basement Jaxx in transition, trying to paint maximalist strokes from a minimalist palette." Rolling Stone critic Julianne Escobedo Shepherd named it "a refreshing kick box to a dance scene full of mindless trendhopping", and gave it a three-and-a-half-star rating. A seven-out-of-ten review from NME's Chris Cottingham called the sound "Nothing new, then, but the Jaxx's sound returns re-energised." In his review for The Sydney Morning Herald, Craig Mathieson, awarding it three stars, concluding that "Instead of making an oversized statement after a lengthy absence, Felix Buxton and Simon Ratcliffe have slipped back into their favourite steps." Drowned in Sound's Sean Thomas said that "If you expect anything that deviates from their cemented formula or a radical reinvention, then Junto is not for you. If you are happy to enjoy the ride while it lasts, it is the perfect soundtrack to an Indian summer." Blue Sullivan of Slant Magazine described the record as "a faint but potent reminder of why this group was once so important to the genre, and coupled with their still-impressive ear for hooks, it ultimately makes this time-travelling tour through late-'90s/early-'00s electronica a trip worth taking." In The Guardian's review, Paul MacInnes called it their "decent return", and opined that "There may not be a standout track here – a Romeo or a Red Alert – and the desire to show their range (almost every track fuses a different style, from dancehall to trap or tropicalia) dilutes the effect of the whole. In each song, though, there'll be a small detail that hints at the skill of Simon Ratcliffe and Felix Buxton as producers."

On the more mixed side, Nate Patrin of Pitchfork wrote that "while Junto is at least happy enough to lift spirits, it feels like they've left it to others to reintroduce anarchy to the dancefloor." Katherine McLaughlin, reviewing for The Arts Desk, called it the group's "welcome but underwhelming return", and criticized the "lack of coherence" which "dampens a jumble of good vibrations, making the party atmosphere feel like a distant memory." The A.V. Club's Annie Zaleski concluded his review that "for the most part, Basement Jaxx are coloring within the lines on Junto, which leads to disappointing results." The Line of Best Fit writer John Daniel Bull gave it five out of ten stars, noting that the "Tracks on Junto merge into each other all too often, becoming background melodies when they should be at the forefront of the party." In a State review, Paula Kenny dismissed the record for having "predominately filler with songs that are too long and repetitive", described it as "a greatest hits album without any great hits." James West, who rated it two stars out of five in his article for DIY, said the album "should make for an eclectic, flag-waving affair - but sadly many of its disparate parts blissfully miss the mark." Resident Advisor's Abby Garnett called it "nice indeed, but it may leave you craving something a little stronger."

== Track listing ==
No.	Title	Composer(s)	Length
1.	"Intro (Taiko Juntos opening)"	Simon Ratcliffe; Felix Buxton; Conan Yellowbird	1:16
2.	"Power to the People" (featuring Niara)	Simon Ratcliffe; Felix Buxton	5:36
3.	"Unicorn"	Simon Ratcliffe; Felix Buxton; Niara Scarlett	4:10
4.	"Never Say Never" (featuring ETML)	Simon Ratcliffe; Felix Buxton; Elliot Marshall	4:23
5.	"We Are Not Alone"	Simon Ratcliffe; Felix Buxton; Malika Ferguson	3:42
6.	"What's the News"	Simon Ratcliffe; Felix Buxton; Alex Mills	4:50
7.	"Summer Dem" (featuring Patricia Panther)	Felix Buxton; Peter S. Schott; August Darnell; Niara Scarlett; Tanya Lacey	3:52
8.	"Buffalo" (featuring Mykki Blanco)	Simon Ratcliffe; Felix Buxton; Michael Quattlebaum Jr.	2:27
9.	"Rock This Road" (featuring Shakka)	Simon Ratcliffe; Felix Buxton; Shakka Philip	3:50
10.	"Sneakin' Toronto"	Simon Ratcliffe; Felix Buxton; Carlos Sosa	4:13
11.	"Something About You"	Simon Ratcliffe; Felix Buxton; Melesha O'Garro	3:45
12.	"Mermaid of Salinas" (featuring Nina Miranda)	Simon Ratcliffe; Felix Buxton; Andrea Terrano; Michel Cleis	5:51
13.	"Love Is at Your Side"	Simon Ratcliffe; Felix Buxton	4:27

Japanese bonus tracks
No.	Title	Length
14.	"Wherever You Go" (featuring Chara)
15.	"Oh Dear, I'm Falling in Love with You" (featuring Mademoiselle Yulia)
16.	"Back 2 the Wild" (featuring Miss Emma Lee and Baby Chay)
17.	"What a Difference Your Love Makes" (featuring Sam Brookes)

Deluxe edition tracks
No.	Title	Composer(s)	Length
14.	"Galactical" (featuring Vula)	Simon Ratcliffe; Felix Buxton; Vula Malinga	3:06
15.	"What a Difference Your Love Makes" (featuring Sam Brookes)	Simon Ratcliffe; Felix Buxton; Sam Brookes	5:58
16.	"Daddy Makes Boom Boom"	Simon Ratcliffe; Felix Buxton	3:26
17.	"Never Say Never (Jaxx Extended Mix)"	Simon Ratcliffe; Felix Buxton	5:03
18.	"House Scene (Edit)"	Simon Ratcliffe; Felix Buxton	4:15
19.	"Back 2 the Wild (Jaxx Extended Mix)"	Simon Ratcliffe; Felix Buxton; Miss Emma Lee; Baby Chay	9:12
20.	"Mermaid of Salinas (Boris Brejcha Remix)"	Simon Ratcliffe; Felix Buxton; Nina Miranda	7:21
21.	"Moments in Dub"	Simon Ratcliffe; Felix Buxton	3:14
22.	"Wherever You Go"	Simon Ratcliffe; Felix Buxton	4:35
23.	"Back 2 the Wild (Korean Version)"	Simon Ratcliffe; Felix Buxton; Miss Emma Lee; Baby Chay	4:17
24.	"Back 2 the Wild (Gorgon City Remix)"	Simon Ratcliffe; Felix Buxton; Miss Emma Lee; Baby Chay	6:20
25.	"Never Say Never (GotSome Bring It Back Remix Edit)" (bonus track)	Simon Ratcliffe; Felix Buxton	5:05
26.	"Junto Album Mix"	Simon Ratcliffe; Felix Buxton	56:55

== Personnel ==
Main

- Songwriting, production – Simon Ratcliffe, Felix Buxton

"Intro (Taiko Juntos opening)"

- Vocals – Chay Lee
- Background vocals – Narjge Barge

"Power to the People"

- Songwriting, vocals – Niara Scarlett
- Background vocals – Audiences at the Basement Jaxx UK Tour 2013, Craigie, Dede Costa, Hope, Ketabul Studio All Stars, The, Moko, Rhonda Humphrey
- Bridge vocals – Amara Charles, Kiarah Mills-Foster, Shamouy Mills-Foster
- Kids chorus vocals – Ana Correira, Beatrice Lily Sutcliffe, Chantelle Alisa, Gabrielle Clements, Ibrahim Diallo, Katy Bethell, Rami Kablawi, Reggie Banigo, Ru Guramtunhu, Sarah Edstrom, Senam Ahadzi, Shola Durojaiye, Simba Mauhunduke, Sorcha Crowe
- Brass, strings, woodwinds, flute – The Recycled Orchestra of Cateura, Paraguay
- Harp – Sixto Corvalan
- Trumpet – Ben Edwards

"Unicorn"

- Vocals –Yzabel
- Background vocals – Abigail Bailey, DJ Sneak, Vula Malinga

"Never Say Never"

- Songwriting, vocals – ETML
- Background vocals – Yzabel
- Co-production – Baunz
- Kids chorus vocals – Charles, Kiarah and Shamouy Mills-Foster

"We Are Not Alone"

- Vocals – Meleka
- Background vocals – Cassie Watson, Sharlene Hector, Tasha Marikkar
- Background vocals, human beatbox – Shakka
- Kids chorus vocals – Charles, Kiarah and Shamouy Mills-Foster
- Trumpet – Edwards

"What's the News"

- Vocals – Alex Mills
- Background vocals – Hector, Malinga

"Summer Dem"

- Songwriting, vocals – Patricia Panther
- Vocals – Scarlett, Tanya Lacey
- Background vocals – Malinga
- "Additional vibes" – Taiysha Norman Davis

"Buffalo"

- Songwriting, vocals – Mykki Blanco
- Background vocals – Lady Leshurr, Lonnie Liston Smith, Stylo G

"Rock This Road"

- Songwriting, vocals – Shakka
- Background vocals – Julie of Ketabul Studios, Hector, Malinga

"Sneakin' Toronto"

- Vocals – DJ Sneak, Buxton
- Background vocals – Alma Duah

"Something About You"

- Vocals – Lady Leshurr

"Mermaid of Salinas"

- Songwriting, vocals – Nina Miranda
- Songwriting (uncredited), vocals, guitar – Andrea Terrano
- Vocals – Elisangela Mahogany, Raghu Dixit, Sam Fox
- Chorus vocals – Duncan F. Brown, Buxton, Kele Le Roc, Ratcliffe, Malinga
- Co-production – Boris Brejcha, Michael Cleis
- Trumpet – Edwards

"Love Is At Your Side"

- Vocals – Sam Brookes
- Background vocals – Bailey, Hector
- Dulcimer – Chun Man

== Charts ==
Chart (2014)	Peak position
Australian Albums (ARIA)	98
Australian Dance Albums (ARIA)	9
Belgian Albums (Ultratop Flanders)	72
Belgian Albums (Ultratop Wallonia)	105
Irish Albums (IRMA)	65
Irish Independent Albums (IRMA)	10
Japanese Albums (Oricon)	52
South Korean Albums (GAON)	84
South Korean International Albums (GAON)	17
UK Albums (Official Charts)	30
UK Dance Albums (Official Charts)	3
UK Independent Albums (Official Charts)	7
US Billboard 200	168
US Top Dance Albums (Billboard)	5
US Independent Albums (Billboard)	28
US Heatseekers Albums (Billboard)	4
