= Pleix =

Community of digital artists in Paris, France

Pleix is a virtual community of digital artists based in Paris. Composed of seven individuals, Pleix works on a shared philosophy, using moving art and music to showcase their view of the world. So far this has manifested itself in several videos, adverts and installations that are all based on staples of contemporary culture. They work has been presented in places like Centre Pompidou, Guggenheim Bilbao, la Gaîté lyrique, I.C.A London, and the Tokyo Museum of Photography.
