= Corrina Joseph =

British singer

- Born: United Kingdom
- Origin: United Kingdom
- Occupation: Singer

Corrina Joseph is a British singer who gained recognition through her collaborations with Basement Jaxx. She later signed to and released solo material through their label, Atlantic Jaxx. She later affiliated with One Little Indian. She has also sung on productions by artists such as Underground Solution, Kamasutra, Masterbuilders, Nightmares on Wax, Classen Collective, Russ Gabriel and Harlem Zip Code. The most successful production she has appeared on is Basement Jaxx's single "Fly Life", which reached number 18 on the UK Singles Chart in 1997.
