= Zephyr (Basement Jaxx album) =

Studio album by Basement Jaxx
- Released: 7 December 2009
- Recorded: March 2007 – September 2009
- Genre: Chill-out
- Length: 33:16
- Label: XL
- Producer: Simon Ratcliffe; Felix Buxton

Basement Jaxx chronology
Scars (2009)	Zephyr (2009)	Junto (2014)

Zephyr is the sixth studio album by English electronic music duo Basement Jaxx, released on 7 December 2009 through XL Recordings internationally. A departure from their prior work, it was described as chill-out music. Zephyr was originally intended to be a double album with Scars, released in September 2009, but each was ultimately issued separately. The album missed most major music charts, but did appear at number 12 on the UK Dance Albums Chart.

== Background ==
The group had originally planned on recording a double album, with one album consisting of more ambient and mellow songs and the other traditional dance music tracks. However, the group decided on releasing Scars on its own, with Zephyr as its follow-up.

Felix Buxton told PopMatters: "[As] we were very keen on kind of doing a double-album. And then it’s just one of those things: you feel [you’re in] your progressive rock phase. It's very Spinal Tap to do a double-album, and acts [sometimes] take themselves too seriously, so we were at that point [where] we want to take ourselves seriously; and also we also always enjoy doing the soundscape stuff."

Zephyr was released on 7 December 2009 by record label XL. Initially, the album was only released as a digital download, but a physical release followed in March 2010.

The track "Hip Hip Hooray" was created for the Tate Modern as part of a series of tracks commissioned to be played alongside paintings. The track was inspired by the painting by Karel Appel, and includes cello, piano and organ by Jack Nunn.

"Walking in the Clouds" features the voice of Joe Benjamin, a 70-year-old Bermudan man that walks around Brixton with "a Stetson hat, a large stick and a kind of poncho." Buxton befriended him when he used to live there, then he invited Benjamin to the studio to record "Benjilude", an interlude from their 2003 album Kish Kash.

== Reception ==
Professional ratings
Review scores
Source	Rating
AllMusic	3.5/5 stars
Pitchfork	7.0/10

AllMusic called the album an "altogether more reflective affair [than Scars] that allows Buxton and Ratcliffe to showcase their unique interpretation of a chillout album", though criticising the album's short length.

== Track listing ==
Zephyr track listing
No.	Title	Length
1.	"Intro"	0:19
2.	"Peace of Mind"	7:12
3.	"Alkazaar"	3:41
4.	"Hip Hip Hooray"	2:53
5.	"Walking in the Clouds"	3:39
6.	"Where R We Now"	5:14
7.	"Dark Vale"	1:32
8.	"Check the Fuse"	0:54
9.	"Sunrising"	2:01
10.	"Ascension"	5:51

== Charts ==
Chart performance for Zephyr
Chart (2009–2010)	Peak position
UK Dance Albums (OCC)	12
