= Crazy Itch Radio =

Studio album by Basement Jaxx
- Released: 4 September 2006
- Recorded: 2006
- Genre: House
- Length: 51:05
- Label: XL
- Producers: Simon Ratcliffe; Felix Buxton

Basement Jaxx chronology
The Singles (2005)	Crazy Itch Radio (2006)	Scars (2009)

Singles from Crazy Itch Radio
- 1. "Hush Boy" Released: 28 August 2006; 2. "Take Me Back to Your House" Released: 30 October 2006; 3. "Hey U" Released: 5 March 2007

Crazy Itch Radio is the fourth studio album by English electronic music duo Basement Jaxx. The album features Linda Lewis and Swedish popstar Robyn among the guest vocalists.

The album was listed on several publications' year-end lists, including The Observer and PopMatters.

== Background ==
"The Crazy Itch of life is the thing that inspires and motivates you to act," explains Felix Buxton about the title of the album.

The duo ended up making about 40 songs for the album. "And then towards of the process of the album, we're like 'Okay, we got to focus on some now and get them finished.'"

The duo incorporated Balkan horns on the album.

It was originally scheduled for an early 2006 release but the release date was put back.

"Hush Boy" and "Take Me Back to Your House" were released as singles. "Hey U" was released as a single to digital download services in 5 March 2007.

For the song "Hush Boy", the band worked with vocalist Vula Malinga to create its melody over a basic track. Vula's vocal was then kept but all the music was redone, which the band said allowed them "a tremendous amount of freedom to explore different sounds".

== Critical reception ==
Professional ratings
Aggregate scores
Source	Rating
Metacritic	73/100
Review scores
Source	Rating
AllMusic	4/5 stars
The A.V. Club	B+
Entertainment Weekly	B+
Mojo	4/5 stars
The Phoenix	3.5/4 stars
Pitchfork	7.4/10
PopMatters	7/10
Q	2.5/5 stars
Slant Magazine	4/5 stars
Uncut	4/5 stars

The album was given a score of 73 out of 100 by Metacritic based on "generally favorable reviews", although less so than Basement Jaxx's previous records. AllMusic gave it 4 out of 5 stars, writing "at this point, it's impossible to imagine them topping themselves; an album that is merely deeply engaging and wildly entertaining cannot be considered a flop in any way." In his Consumer Guide, Robert Christgau gave the album a two-star honorable mention, stating, "Interchangeable ladies detail interchangeable ups and downs over beats whose changeabilty supposedly renders them indelible," and picked out two songs from the album, "Take Me Back to Your House" and "Run 4 Cover".

Pitchfork, while still giving the album a positive review, wrote, "Crazy Itch Radio isn't a bad album by any means; it just doesn't scream "best album of the year" from the moment you put it on." NME, on the other hand, was more critical, writing "It's easy enough to ignore until a real stinker passes by."

Dave Rinehart, writing for Resident Advisor, considered the album "easily the duo's best". He also praised its diverse production, "expertly layering influences plucked from all over the world".

PopMatters's Tim O'Neil rated the album as his tenth Best Electronic Music of 2006 for the website, stating that It's not their best album, not compared to 1999's epochal Remedy or 2001's assured Rooty. But it is an improvement on 2003's overrated Kish Kash, which garnered so much initial attention but hasn't aged nearly as well as its predecessors. Thankfully, Crazy Itch Radio is nowhere near as hyperkinetic and jam-packed as Kish Kash. It still feels stuffed to the gills in places, but it seems as if the duo have at least acknowledged that an album like Kish Kash was so dense as to be almost unlistenable in places. There are still a few moments of confusion and chaos—why the hell did they bury the lead on "Hush Boy" but have a grimey Muppet scream the chorus?—but when the Jaxx are on, as on a track like "Take Me Back to Your House", they work better than almost any other dance act in the world today..

== Promotion ==
In 2006, Basement Jaxx were the support acts for the European leg of Robbie Williams's Close Encounters Tour, which started on 9 June and ended on 19 September. The duo at first refused to be a part of the tour because most of Ratcliffe's friends who "are into good music don't think Robbie's very good at all". They later changed their minds after learning Williams was playing at Wembley Stadium, which Ratcliffe called "such a historical venue", and because their friends encouraged them.

== Track listing ==
All tracks are written by Felix Buxton and Simon Ratcliffe, except where noted.

Crazy Itch Radio – Standard edition
No.	Title	Writer(s)	Length
1.	"Intro"	Wil Malone	0:37
2.	"Hush Boy"	Buxton; Ratcliffe; A.D. Burrise; J.D. Burrise; Vula Malinga	3:59
3.	"Zoomalude"	Butch Bonner; Lorna Hamilton	0:50
4.	"Take Me Back to Your House"	Buxton; Ratcliffe; Martina Sorbara	5:08
5.	"Hey U"	Buxton; Ratcliffe; Henry Ernst; Adrian Sical	4:54
6.	"On the Train"	Buxton; Ratcliffe; Tommy Blaize	4:14
7.	"Run 4 Cover"	Buxton; Ratcliffe; Daryl John	4:14
8.	"Skillalude"		0:35
9.	"Smoke Bubbles"		4:20
10.	"Lights Go Down"	Buxton; Ratcliffe; Linda Lewis	5:13
11.	"Intro (Reprise)"		0:36
12.	"Everybody"	Buxton; Ratcliffe; Reena Bhardwaj	5:53
13.	"Keep Keep On"		2:24
14.	"U R on My Mind" (includes hidden track "As the Night Moves On")	Buxton	8:09
Total length:			51:05

Crazy Itch Radio – Japanese edition bonus tracks
No.	Title	Writer(s)	Length
14.	"U R on My Mind"	Buxton	3:45
15.	"Trouble"		3:19
16.	"Hush Salsa" ("Hush Boy" remix; includes hidden track "As the Night Moves On")	Buxton; Ratcliffe; A.D. Burrise; J.D. Burrise; Malinga	8:47
Total length:			58:47

== Personnel ==
Credits adapted from the album's liner notes.

Basement Jaxx

- Felix Buxton – mixing, production, vocals (14)
- Simon Ratcliffe – mixing, production

Additional musicians

- Sean Allen – DJing (2)
- Atlantic Horns – horns (2, 6, 9, 10)
  - Mark Brown
  - Ben Edwards
  - Mike Kearsey
- Winston Blissett – bass guitar (2, 3, 13)
- Mark Brown – clarinet (3)
- The London Session Orchestra – strings (1, 4, 10, 11, 14)
- Wil Malone – string arrangements and conducting (1, 4, 10, 11, 14)
- Serguei Pachnine – accordion and backing vocals (5)
- Gavyn Wright – string fixer (1, 4, 10, 11, 14)

Technical personnel

- Basement Jaxx – mixing (1–9, 11–14)
- Jason Boshoff – mixing (2, 4, 5, 7, 10)
- Andy Hughes – mixing (1, 9)
- Geoff Pesche – mastering
- No Days Off – art direction, design
- Fern Graham – artwork modelling
- Russell Kirby – artwork retouching
- John Short – photography
- Nigel Walton – compiling

Additional vocalists

- Lily Allen – backing vocals (10)
- Martina Bang – vocals (4), backing vocals (12)
- Reena Bhardwaj – vocals (11–12)
- Joe Benjamin – backing vocals (13)
- Tommy Blaize – vocals (6)
- Charmzy – backing vocals (8)
- Dwayne Ellis – backing vocals (12)
- Sharlene Hector – backing vocals (12)
- Wayne Hernandez – spoken vocals (6)
- Dandino Jhet – vocals (5)
- Daryl John – vocals (11), backing vocals (7)
- Linda Lewis – vocals (10), backing vocals (5)
- Vula Malinga – vocals (2–3), backing vocals (12), vocal effects (4)
- Lady Marga – vocals (7)
- Biz Markie – beatboxing (2)
- Metro Voices – choir (1, 10, 11)
  - Jenny O'Grady – choirmaster (1, 10, 11)
- Nanthomba Orphan School – vocals (5)
- Milly Oldfield – vocals (9, 13)
- Ade Omotayo – backing vocals (14)
- Robyn – vocals (5)
- Younger Sensation – backing vocals (8)
- Shea – spoken vocals (6)
- Kay Shin – backing vocals (14)
- Skillah – vocals (2, 8), backing vocals (12)
- Marcus J. Thomas – backing vocals (5, 13)
- Cassie Watson – spoken vocals (4)
- Elida Zulu – vocals (12)

== Charts ==
Chart performance for Crazy Itch Radio
Chart (2006)	Peak position
Australian Albums (ARIA)	70
Belgian Albums (Ultratop Flanders)	21
Belgian Albums (Ultratop Wallonia)	63
Dutch Albums (Album Top 100)	59
Irish Albums (IRMA)	29
Norwegian Albums (VG-lista)	40
UK Albums (Official Charts)	16
UK Dance Albums (Official Charts)	1
UK Independent Albums (Official Charts)	1
US Top Dance Albums (Billboard)	4
