= Lil' Mo' Yin Yang =

Lil' Mo' Yin Yang is a collaborative house-music act of producers and DJs Erick Morillo and Masters at Work's Little Louie Vega. Their only song, "Reach," released in 1995 on Strictly Rhythm records, hit #1 on the Hot Dance Music/Club Play chart at the end of the year.

== See also ==
- List of Billboard number-one dance club songs
- List of artists who reached number one on the U.S. Dance Club Songs chart
