= Hush Boy =

2006 single by Basement Jaxx

Single by Basement Jaxx

from the album Crazy Itch Radio
- B-side: "Trouble"
- Released: 28 August 2006
- Length: 4:01
- Label: XL
- Songwriters: Simon Ratcliffe; Felix Buxton; Vula Malinga; A. D. Burrise; Stephen Paul Mason; J. D. Burrise

Basement Jaxx singles chronology
"Do Your Thing" (2005)	"Hush Boy" (2006)	"Take Me Back to Your House" (2006)

"Hush Boy" is a song by English electronic music duo Basement Jaxx. It was released in August 2006 by record label XL as the first single from their fourth studio album, Crazy Itch Radio (2006). It reached number 27 on the UK Singles Chart and number 39 in Australia.

== Composition ==
With the song "Oh My Gosh", the duo sat down and wrote it specially as a single for the album. Ratcliffe personally felt encouraged by it, he thought it was a good way to ease them back into songwriting process and applied the treatment to make "Hush Boy". However, they failed, and made the process even more difficult.

Well, I mean it was a starting point, but then the record company said 'Oh, that song's really good, that could be a single.' And then the moment they say it could be a single, it likes... making it really difficult. Cause you think this has to be something that plays on the radio and has to work, but it's recorded as well, and you started to put pressure on the track. And that's not always good. — Buxton talks about the difficulty of making the song to FaceCulture

== Music video ==
Scott Lapatine from Stereogum stated: "Sorry for all the YouTubing today. Well, actually we're not that sorry seeing as how BJaxx never let us down."

== Track listings ==
UK CD single

1. "Hush Boy"
2. "Trouble"

UK 12-inch single 1

1. "Hush Boy"
2. "Hush Salsa"
3. "Trouble"

UK 12-inch single 2

1. "Hush Boy" (Soul Seekerz remix)
2. "Hush Boy" (Les Visiteurs remix)
3. "Hush Boy" (Les Visiteurs dub)

== Charts ==
Weekly chart performance for "Hush Boy"
Chart (2006)	Peak position
Australia (ARIA)	39
Scotland Singles (Official Charts)	28
UK Singles (Official Charts)	27
UK Dance (Official Charts)	4
UK Indie (Official Charts)	3
