= Raindrops (Basement Jaxx song) =

Single by Basement Jaxx

from the album Scars
- Released: 22 June 2009
- Genre: House
- Length: 4:08 (album version); 3:29 (video version)
- Label: XL
- Producer(s): Basement Jaxx

Basement Jaxx singles chronology
"Make Me Sweat" (2007)	"Raindrops" (2009)	"Feelings Gone" (2009)

"Raindrops" is a song by British electronic music duo Basement Jaxx. It was released on 22 June 2009 as the first single from their fifth studio album, Scars. The song uses the Auto-Tune effect, while the male vocals for the song come from the group member Felix Buxton.

== Music video ==
The Jess Holzworth-directed music video for the song made its debut on Channel 4 on 6 June 2009 and it is filmed partly in a kaleidoscope style, featuring women dancing provocatively in colourful feathers, masks, and ferns.

== Critical reception ==
The song has been highly praised by critics. BBC rated the song whole five stars, describing it as "a slinky, pounding, twinkling, uplifting house juggernaut". Digital Spy gave the song three stars, saying that it is "warm and uplifting as a summer breeze flurrying under your skirt" and "marks a welcome, if slightly cautious, return". PopMatters rated "Raindrops" eight out of ten stars, praising both the video and the song as "deliciously disco-esque". Pitchfork also gave the song eight stars, and described it as "one of their best songs" as well as "unashamedly psychedelic, without losing its disco heart". Metro described the single as "an exotic confection laced with rock melodies and a distinctive killer bassline".

Pitchfork later ranked the song at number 24 in their list of the Top 100 Tracks of 2009.

== Track listings ==
CD

1. "Raindrops"
2. "Wheel N Stop (feat. Serocee) (Planet 3 version)"

12" vinyl

1. "Raindrops (Original)"
2. "Raindrops (Funk Agenda & Paul Thomas Redux)"

Remixes
No.	Title	Length
1.	"Raindrops (Doorly's Under New Management Remix)"
2.	"Raindrops (Doorly’s Dubstep Remix)"
3.	"Raindrops (Robbie Rivera Club Mix)"
4.	"Raindrops (Robbie Rivera Juicy Dub)"
5.	"Raindrops (Funkagenda & Paul Thomas Re-Dux)"
6.	"Raindrops (Louis La Roche Rework)"
7.	"Raindrops (Joker & Ginz Remix)"
8.	"Raindrops (AN21 & Philip Jensen Remix)"

== Charts ==
"Raindrops" made its debut on the UK Singles Chart on 28 June 2009 at number 21. The song also debuted at number 27 in Ireland, and later climbed to number 20.

Chart performance for "Raindrops"
Chart (2009)	Peak position
Australia (ARIA)	88
Belgium (Ultratip Bubbling Under Flanders)	14
Ireland (IRMA)	20
UK Singles (OCC)	21

== Release history ==
Release history for "Raindrops"
Region	Date	Label
United Kingdom	22 June 2009	XL
Australia	21 June 2009	XL
United States	1 September 2009	Ultra
