= Basement Jaxx =

British electronic music duo

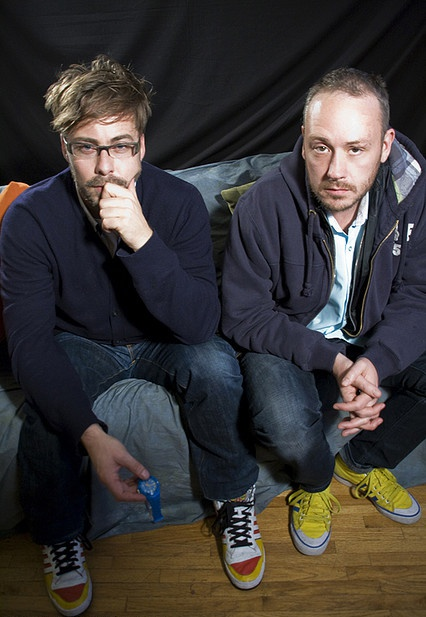
- Basement Jaxx in 2009; Felix Buxton (left) and Simon Ratcliffe (right)

Background information
- Origin: London, England
- Genres: House; electronic; UK garage; big beat
- Years active: 1994–present
- Labels: XL; Interscope; Ultra; Atlantic Jaxx; PIAS; 37 Adventures
- Members: Felix Buxton; Simon Ratcliffe
- Website: basementjaxx.com

Basement Jaxx are an English electronic music duo consisting of Felix Buxton (born 8 May 1970) and Simon Ratcliffe (born 28 November 1969). The pair got their name from the regular club night they held in Brixton, London, England. They rose to popularity in the underground house scene of the mid-1990s,, leading to international chart success and winning Best Dance Act at both the 2002 and 2004 Brit Awards. Some of their most successful singles are "Fly Life", "Red Alert", "Rendez-Vu", "Romeo", "Where's Your Head At", "Do Your Thing", and "Good Luck".

== Background ==
Felix Buxton's father the Rev Derek Major Buxton (4 February 1931 – 17 March 2022) was a Leicestershire vicar, who was ordained in 1960 at Leicester Cathedral. He was then the assistant Anglican chaplain of the University of Leicester, moving to Ibstock in May 1969. The Rev Buxton and wife Eileen moved from Ibstock, to St Paul's Woodhouse Eaves and St Mary's church in Woodhouse on 27 April 1987, with a ceremony conducted by the Bishop of Leicester, on Tuesday 5 May 1987. His father retired in April 1998.

Felix Buxton attended Loughborough Grammar School before going on to study Engineering Design at the University of Exeter.

== 1992–1998: Formation ==
In 1992, Simon Ratcliffe began releasing white label records, gaining him the attention of several music producers including LTJ Bukem and Goldie. The success of these releases enabled him to buy a few electronic musical instruments and set up a basic studio in a friend's mother's basement.

Ratcliffe and Buxton first met in 1993 through a mutual friend in a pub in Clapham, London. The two bonded over an appreciation of New York house music. They released their first extended play called EP1 via the British independent record label Wall of Sound, with the help of its founder Mark Jones. The album went on to sell over 1,000 copies and was played on American radio by Tony Humphries in New York City.

Basement Jaxx began in Brixton, South London, in 1994, where Ratcliffe and Buxton held a regular club night called Basement Jaxx. The night was also held in a variety of venues including The George IV, The Crypt and The Junction. They were joined by DJs including DJ Sneak, Daft Punk, and singer Corrina Joseph. They mutated the night into an equally popular club called Rooty, the namesake of their second album. Initially, the duo considered "Underground Oasis" as a name for the group, but the idea was scrapped reportedly after a friend informed them of a similarly named rock band that might "get big".

An important milestone for Basement Jaxx's career was their role as the opening act for successful French dance group Daft Punk's Daftendirektour. It was around this time that Basement Jaxx began collaborating with vocalist Corrina Joseph, a collaboration that resulted in the single "Fly Life", which was released by Virgin Records in 1997. Following the success of "Fly Life", the duo signed a record deal with XL, with whom they released their subsequent six albums.

== 1999–2001: Remedy ==
In 1999, the group released their first full-length album, Remedy. It included the singles "Red Alert", "Jump n' Shout", "Bingo Bango", and "Rendez-Vu", which is Basement Jaxx's highest UK Singles Chart entry to date, at number 4. Basement Jaxx also released Jaxx Unreleased, a compilation album of B-sides, remixes, and other assorted material, in 1999. 2000 saw them release Camberwell, another release of new material.

== 2001–2004: Rooty ==
Their next album, 2001's Rooty included singles "Romeo", "Jus 1 Kiss", "Where's Your Head At?", and "Do Your Thing", which was featured in the film Bend It Like Beckham as well as Nickelodeon and Coca-Cola commercials. The music video for album opener "Romeo" is an homage to the Bollywood film style. "Where's Your Head At?" became an international hit in 2002, also known for its inclusion on the Lara Croft: Tomb Raider soundtrack. "Do Your Thing" was included in the video game SSX 3. Xxtra Cutz was released shortly after Rooty, containing B-sides from the album's singles. Span Thang and Junction, two EPs, were released in 2001–2002.

Basement Jaxx decided to close the Rooty club in May 2001 after it became "too popular."

== 2003–2005: Kish Kash and The Singles ==
In 2003, Basement Jaxx released their third full-length album, Kish Kash, which included contributions from Siouxsie Sioux, Lisa Kekaula (of the Bellrays), Me'shell Ndegeocello, Dizzee Rascal, Totlyn Jackson, JC Chasez and Phoebe. From this album, the tracks "Lucky Star", "Good Luck", and "Plug It In" were released as singles. The track "Good Luck" was re-released in 2004, after exposure from being the theme to BBC's Euro 2004 coverage, and was also featured in the soundtrack of Just Married and Appleseed, an anime film released in 2004. Kish Kash was recognised the following year at the 47th Grammy Awards, winning Buxton and Ratcliffe the inaugural Best Electronic/Dance Album award.

Basement Jaxx's manager, Andrew Mansi, says Astralwerks chose not to renew its U.S. licensing contract with the duo.

The duo produced "Shake It", a song from JC Chasez's Schizophrenic.

In 2005, the duo released the number 1 compilation The Singles along with a video collection on DVD, comprising all the singles from their previous three albums, some earlier releases (featured on Atlantic Jaxx Recordings: A Compilation), and two new tracks, "Oh My Gosh" and "U Don't Know Me", which were both released as singles. The Singles (Special Edition) was also released, which contained the original compilation along with a bonus disc entitled Bonus Traxx, containing many previously unreleased tracks, as well as remixes of existing Basement Jaxx songs. The duo appeared as a headline act on the Pyramid stage at Glastonbury Festival in 2005 when Kylie Minogue was forced to pull out after being diagnosed with cancer. Basement Jaxx played with a live band made up of artists who recorded the album. Drumtech-trained Nathan 'Tugg' Curran was on drums for Glastonbury and has remained a constant performer.

== 2006–2010: Crazy Itch Radio and Scars ==
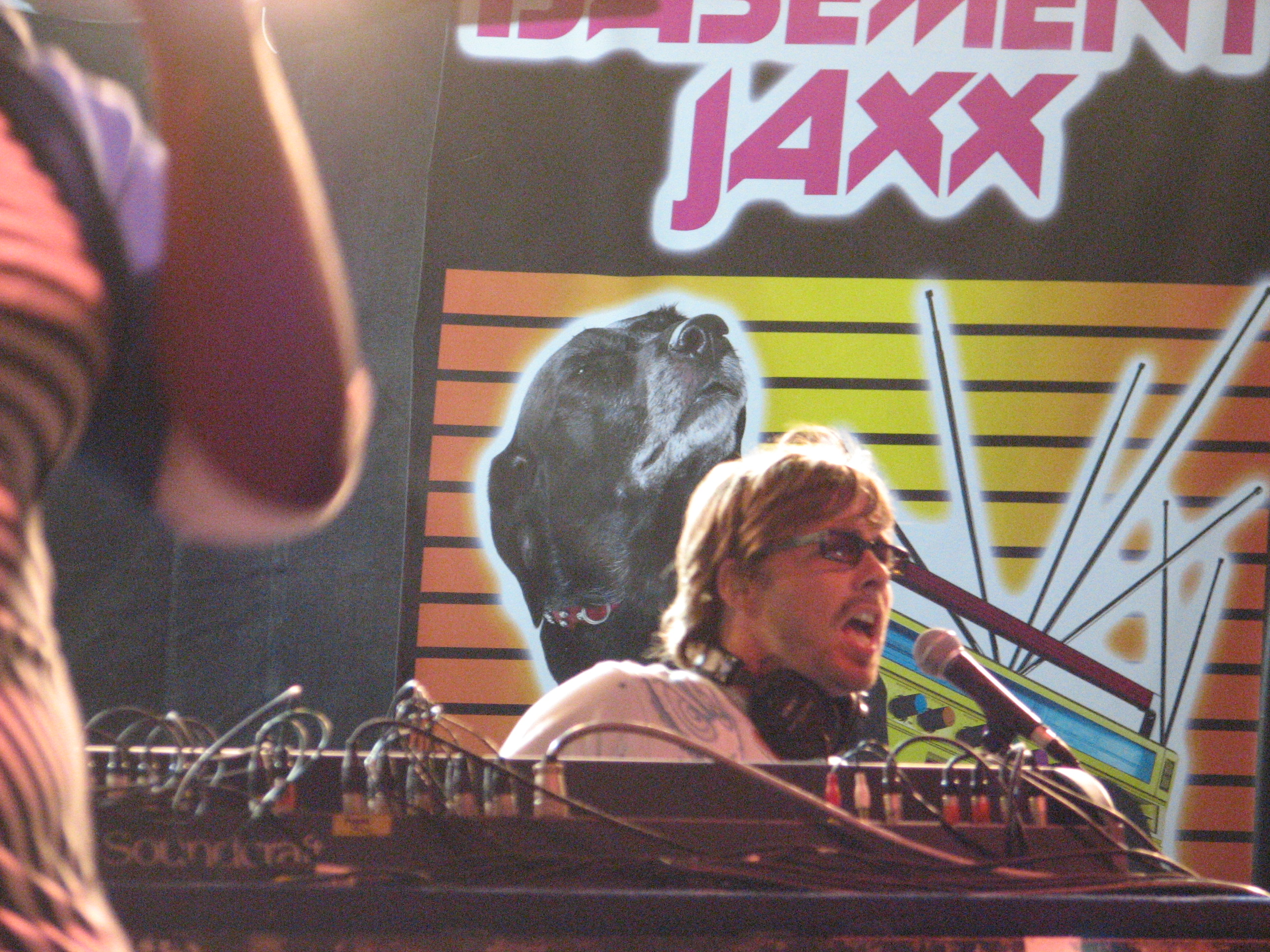
Buxton performing at the LA Weekly Detour Music Festival in 2006

Their fourth studio album, Crazy Itch Radio, was released on 4 September 2006 in the UK, simultaneously with its first single, "Hush Boy". The album featured guest vocals by Martina Sorbara (credited as "Martina Bang"), Lily Allen, and Robyn. In 2006, Basement Jaxx were also one of the support acts for Robbie Williams on his 'Close Encounters' tour. For Cyndi Lauper's Bring Ya to the Brink in 2008, they produced and wrote the track "Rocking Chair". They also released a trilogy of EPs of new material, entitled Planet.

In 2009, Buxton revealed in a BBC Radio 1 broadcast that Basement Jaxx's forthcoming album Scars was completed and being mastered. Buxton stated that the tracks include guest appearances by Yoko Ono, Santigold, Lightspeed Champion, and Yo! Majesty. The band was also interested in getting Grace Jones to add vocals to the new album. The album was released in September 2009. The first single "Raindrops" preceded it in June 2009. The band recorded at the Bizspace centre in Coldharbour Lane, in Loughborough Junction.

Also in 2009, their album Zephyr was released.

In 2010, the duo released the non-album single "Dracula".

== 2011–present: Attack the Block and Junto ==
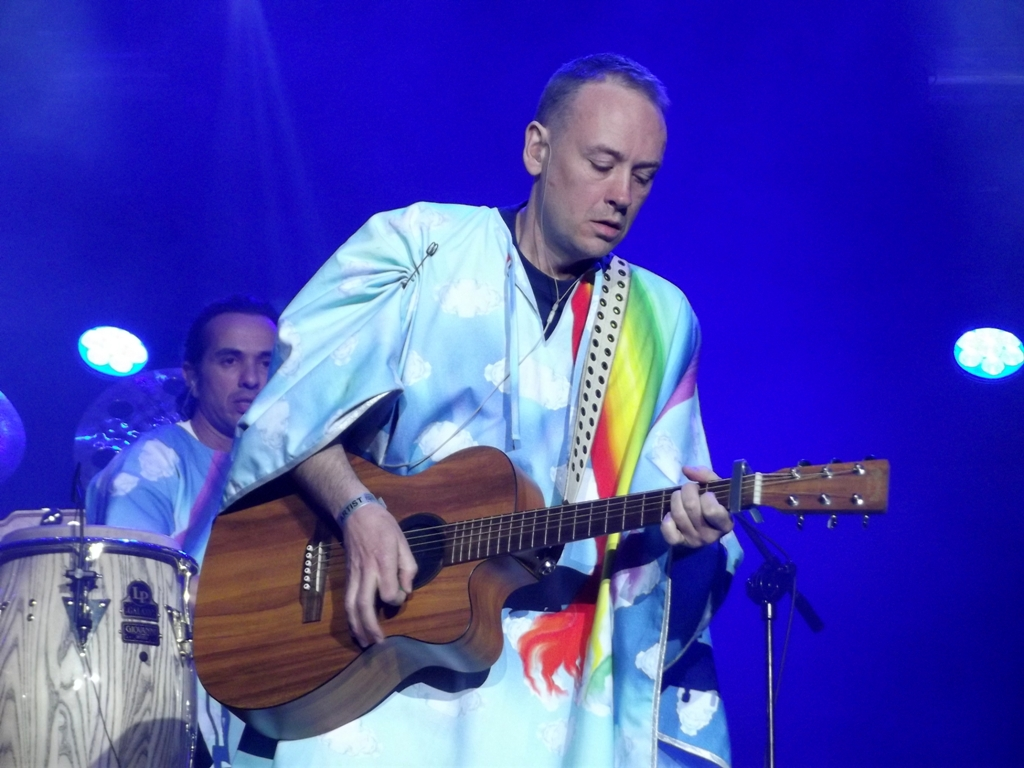
Ratcliffe performing at the 2013 Orange Warsaw Festival

2011 saw the duo collaborating twice: with Metropole Orkest for the live album Basement Jaxx vs. Metropole Orkest, and also with Steven Price for the soundtrack to the 2011 film Attack the Block.

In November 2011, Simon revealed the pair were working on a new album – hinting that some tracks were already appearing in their DJ sets. At their first live show for several years at Chiswick House Festival in July 2012, the band performed some new material from their forthcoming album including the song "Diamonds". Possible tracks that were predicted to appear on the album according to Pitchfork include "Make.Believe", "Let's Rock this Road Together", "Back 2 the Wild", "We R Not Alone", "Galactical", "Power 2 The People", "Mermaid of Salinas", "People of Planet Earth", and "What a Difference Your Love Makes". The band ran a contest through graphic design firm JDO, where the band will use the graphic identity (including the album and single artwork designs) that the winner created for their upcoming album and consequent promotional items.

"Back 2 the Wild" was released as a single on 12 April 2013, with an accompanying video co-directed by Matt Maitland and Natalia Stuyk being uploaded to their YouTube account on 16 April, though the single ultimately did not appear on the upcoming album.

"What a Difference Your Love Makes" was released as a single on 30 September 2013. The single's accompanying video was released on Vevo on 7 August 2013. It was directed by Damian Weilers and shot in South Africa. On 1 May 2014, Basement Jaxx released a new song for the album called "Unicorn" on SoundCloud.

On 19 May 2014, Basement Jaxx officially announced their seventh album, Junto, which was released on 25 August 2014 through Atlantic Jaxx and PIAS. In July, the duo released the first lead single off the album, "Never Say Never". The music video, directed by Saman Kesh, is about the development of a "twerking" robot that is intended to save humanity from a world without dancing and features the robotic prototype simulation of human buttocks, "Shiri" (likely an allusion to Siri), developed by the Japanese scientist Nobuhiro Takahashi.

== Other projects ==
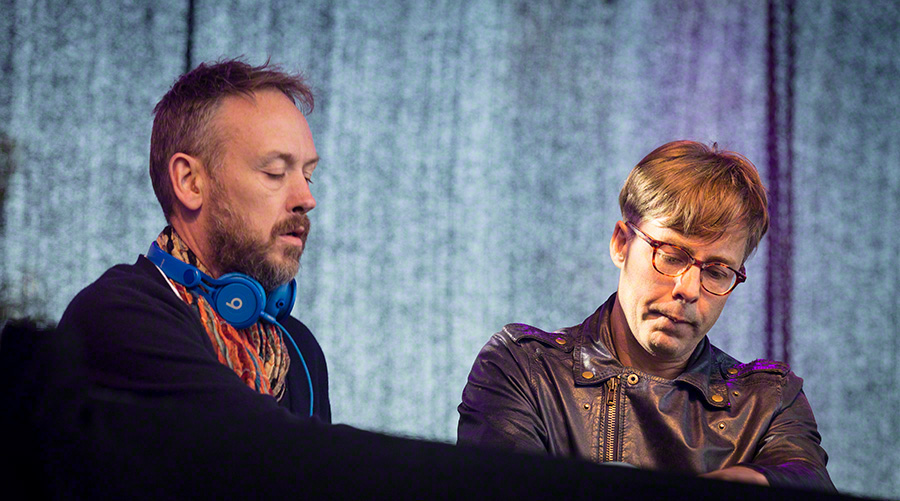
Basement Jaxx in 2016

In addition to their own work, Basement Jaxx have become in-demand remixers. Their more prominent work includes remixes of "4 My People" by Missy "Misdemeanor" Elliott, "Everyman… Everywoman…" by Yoko Ono, "Like I Love You" by Justin Timberlake, and "She Wants to Move" by N.E.R.D, which was included as a B-side on the follow-up single "Maybe." They also collaborated with Janet Jackson on unreleased songs for her Damita Jo album. Sophie Ellis-Bextor, as well as The Botz and Garold Marks, have stated they are fans and would like to collaborate with Basement Jaxx in the future.

In 2021, the duo remixed Australian singer Kylie Minogue's 2020 single "Say Something", which can currently be found on YouTube; additionally, it will be available on the deluxe version of Minogue's latest album—entitled Disco: Guest List Edition—from 12 November 2021.

The duo were invited to write an exclusive piece of music to accompany a work of art they admired in London's Tate Modern museum, Karel Appel's "Hip, Hip, Hoorah!". The work was initially not available for sale, but later appeared on the album Zephyr. In 2007, their track "Close Your Eyes", sung by Linda Lewis, was featured in the Japanese CGI anime movie Vexille.

Felix Buxton appeared on Never Mind the Buzzcocks on 23 September 2013 – the opening episode of Series 27, on Noel Fielding's team.

In 2019, the duo composed the music for the CITV animated series The Rubbish World of Dave Spud. The duo also collaborated with The Sydney Metropolitan Orchestra for a live re-imagining of some of their classic songs.

In 2021, they composed the title music for the CBeebies series What's On Your Head?,, followed by What's In Your Bag? in 2023 and What's In Your Plant Pot? in 2026.

== Musical style ==
In the past, Buxton's father did not let him watch Top of the Pops and played his children Austrian music and Japanese music instead. "He was always very proud of that we didn't watch Top of the Pops. [...] He thought that made me hungry and want it more," he said. He was a big fan of American house music, which was difficult to get hold of in his hometown at the time. "I used to listen to Choice FM where the legends of the scene could be heard and went to Blackmarket Records in London's Soho to try and find the sounds I was looking for."

Basement Jaxx's music has been described variously as house and big beat over the course of their career. Prince's influence has also been found on their music. "I remember when we first came to America, they had to work out which radio stations we could go to," Buxton says. "They said that in a way we were a bit for urban stations, we were a bit for pop stations. They didn't know where to place us and things were very segregated back then."

== Awards and nominations ==
Antville Music Video Awards

Year	Nominee / work	Award	Result
2005	"U Don't Know Me"	Best Video	Nominated

Billboard Music Awards

Year	Nominee / work	Award	Result
2000	Themselves	Top Hot Dance Club Play Artist	Nominated
2000	Themselves	Top Hot Dance Club Play Artist – Duo/Group	Won

Brit Awards

Year	Nominee / work	Award	Result
2000	Themselves	Best British Dance Act	Nominated
2000	Remedy	MasterCard British Album	Nominated
2000	"Red Alert"	Best British Single	Nominated
2002	"Where's Your Head At"	Best British Video	Nominated
2002	Themselves	Best British Dance Act	Won
2004	Themselves	Best British Dance Act	Won

D&AD Awards

Year	Nominee / work	Award	Result
2002	"Where's Your Head At"	Direction	Graphite Pencil
2006	"Oh My Gosh"	Direction	Wood Pencil

DanceStar Awards

Year	Nominee / work	Award	Result
2000	Themselves	Best House Act	Won

Denmark GAFFA Awards

Year	Nominee / work	Award	Result
1999	Themselves	Foreign New Act	Nominated

Grammy Awards

Year	Nominee / work	Award	Result
2005	Kish Kash	Best Dance/Electronic Album	Won

GQ Awards

Year	Nominee / work	Award	Result	Ref.
2001	Themselves	Band of the Year	Nominated	

Groovevolt Music and Fashion Awards

Year	Nominee / work	Award	Result
2007	Crazy Itch Radio	Best Dance Recording	Nominated

International Dance Music Awards

Year	Nominee / work	Award	Result
2000	Themselves	Best New Dance Artist (Group)	Won
2000	Themselves	Best Dance Artist (Group)	Won
2003	Themselves	Best Dance Artist (Group)	Nominated
2005	Themselves	Best Dance Artist (Group)	Nominated

Ivor Novello Awards

Year	Nominee / work	Award	Result
2000	"Rendez-Vu"	The Ivors Dance Award	Nominated
2002	"Where's Your Head At"	The Ivors Dance Award	Nominated

Kiss Awards

Year	Nominee / work	Award	Result
2005	Themselves	Hottest Producer	Nominated
2005	Themselves	Best Group	Nominated
2005	Live at Glastonbury	Live Vibe of the Year	Nominated

MTV Europe Music Awards

Year	Nominee / work	Award	Result
1999	Themselves	Best UK & Ireland Act	Nominated
1999	Themselves	Best Dance	Nominated
2001	Themselves	Best Dance	Nominated
2002	"Where's Your Head At"	Best Video	Nominated

MTV Video Music Awards Japan

Year	Nominee / work	Award	Result
2002	Themselves	Best Dance	Nominated
2015	"Back 2 the Wild"	Best Collaboration	Nominated
2015	Themselves & Team Syachihoko	Best Live Performance	Won

MVPA Awards

Year	Nominee / work	Award	Result
2002	"Where's Your Head At"	Best Directional Debut	Won

NME Awards

Year	Nominee / work	Award	Result
2000	Themselves	Best New Act	Nominated
2000	Themselves	Best Dance Act	Nominated

PLUG Awards

Year	Nominee / work	Award	Result
2007	Crazy Itch Radio	Electronic/Dance Album Of The Year	Nominated

Popjustice 20 Quid Music Prize

Year	Nominee / work	Award	Result
2005	"Oh My Gosh"	Best British Pop Single	Nominated

Q Awards

Year	Nominee / work	Award	Result
1999	Themselves	Best New Act	Won
2001	"Romeo"	Best Video	Nominated

UK Festival Awards

Year	Nominee / work	Award	Result	Ref.
2004	Themselves	Best Headline Act	Nominated	
2007	Themselves	Best Dance Act	Nominated	

UK Music Video Awards

Year	Nominee / work	Award	Result
2014	"Mermaids of Salinas"	Best Pop Video – Budget	Nominated

Viva Comet Awards

Year	Nominee / work	Award	Result
2002	"Where's Your Head At"	Best International Video	Won

== Discography ==
- Remedy (1999)
- Rooty (2001)
- Kish Kash (2003)
- Crazy Itch Radio (2006)
- Scars (2009)
- Zephyr (2009)
- Junto (2014)

== See also ==
- List of number-one dance hits (United States)
- List of artists who reached number one on the US dance chart
