= Atlantic Jaxx =

English record company

- Founded: 1994
- Founder: Felix Buxton; Simon Ratcliffe
- Genre: Dance, electronic, house, soul
- Country of origin: United Kingdom
- Location: London, England
- Official website: www.atlanticjaxx.com

Atlantic Jaxx Recordings is a British record label founded by electronic band Basement Jaxx. Originally based in Camberwell and then Brixton, it was an outlet for releasing Basement Jaxx music. Its first release was "EP1" which was played by DJ Tony Humphries on New York Radio in 1994.

== Artists include ==
- Afrofiesta
- Gwyn Jay Allen
- Basement Jaxx (also released under the aliases of "Banana Krew", "Jacques da Booty", "Nifty" and "Jaxtrak". Solo records by Felix as "Buxton", "Celestial Being", "Geranimo", "Pinhead" and "EYES", and Simon as "Ratcliffe")
- House Breakerz
- Moreno
- Phil Linton
- Sharlene Hector
- Snakeskin
- The Heartists
- Pinhead
- Dog Beats
- Ronnie Richards
- Yen Sung
- CL Gris
- Andrea Terrano (featuring Samantha Moyo, founder of Morning Gloryville)
- EYES
- Immortal Scientist (Slarta John and Danny James)
- Celestial Being
- Geranimo & Mikey
- Planet Battagon
- Bigby
- Jack Nunn

== See also ==
- List of record labels
