= Shola Ama discography =

- Studio albums: 4
- Compilation albums: 2
- Singles: 23

English singer Shola Ama has released four studio albums, two compilation albums and 23 singles (including 9 as a featured artist).

== Albums ==
=== Studio albums ===
List of albums, with selected chart positions and certifications
Title	Album details	Peak chart positions				Certifications
Title	Album details	UK	FRA	GER	ITA	Certifications
Much Love	Released: 1 September 1997; Label: Freakstreet, WEA; Formats: CD, cassette	6	21	19	13	BPI: Gold; FIMI: Gold; SNEP: Gold
In Return	Released: 8 November 1999; Label: Freakstreet, WEA; Formats: CD, digital download	92	57	97	—	
Supersonic	Released: 2002; Label: Canyon, EMI; Formats: CD, digital download	—	126	—	—	
Surreal	Released: 2015; Label: Necessary Mayhem; Formats: CD, digital download	—	—	—	—	

=== Compilation albums ===
- The Very Best of Shola Ama (2012)
- You Might Need Somebody (2020)

== Singles ==
=== As main artist ===
List of singles as main artist, with selected chart positions and parent album
Title	Year	Peak chart positions						Album
Title	Year	UK	FRA	GER	IRE	NLD	NZ	Album
"Celebrate"	1995	—	—	—	—	—	—	Much Love
"You're the One I Love"	1996	85	—	—	—	—	—	Much Love
"You Might Need Somebody"	1997	4	10	21	9	8	8	Much Love
"You're the One I Love" (re-issue)	1997	3	81	—	—	93	45	Much Love
"Who's Loving My Baby"	1997	13	—	—	—	—	—	Much Love
"Much Love"	1998	17	—	—	—	—	—	Much Love
"Someday I'll Find You" (featuring Craig Armstrong)	1998	28	—	—	—	—	—	Twentieth-Century Blues: The Songs of Noël Coward
"Still Believe"	1999	26	9	72	—	—	—	In Return
"Imagine"	1999	24	—	—	—	—	—	In Return
"This I Promise You" (with D'Influence and D-Vas)	2002	95	—	—	—	—	—	Supersonic
"Symphony" (featuring Moïse)	2002	—	53	—	—	—	—	Supersonic
"My Future"	2019	—	—	—	—	—	—	Non-album singles
"Not Us"	2023	—	—	—	—	—	—	Non-album singles
"Good Morning"	2024	—	—	—	—	—	—	Non-album singles

=== As featured artist ===
List of singles as featured artist, with selected chart positions and parent album
Title	Year	Peak chart positions					Album
Title	Year	UK	FRA	IRE	NLD	NZ	Album
"Taboo" (Glamma Kid featuring Shola Ama)	1999	10	78	—	26	22	Non-album single
"Mai più" (Sottotono featuring Shola Ama)	1999	—	—	—	—	—	Sotto lo stesso effetto
"Feels So Good" (B-15 Project featuring Shola Ama and Ms. Dynamite)	2001	82	—	—	—	—	Non-album singles
"You Should Really Know" (The Pirates featuring Shola Ama, Naila Boss, Ishani and Enya)	2004	8	49	25	—	—	Non-album singles
"DJ Play" (Perempay & Dee featuring Shola Ama)	2009	—	—	—	—	—	Written in My History
"Cut Above the Rest" (Giggs featuring Shola Ama)	2009	—	—	—	—	—	Non-album single
"Blow Em Away" (Giggs featuring Shola Ama)	2010	—	—	—	—	—	Let Em Ave It
"Take It Back" (Toddla T featuring Shola Ama and J2K)	2011	59	—	—	—	—	Watch Me Dance
"For You" (Roses Gabor featuring Shola Ama)	2014	—	—	—	—	—	Non-album single
