= FabricLive.47 =

Mixtape by Toddla T
- Released: August 2009
- Genre: Grime, dubstep
- Label: Fabric
- Producer: Toddla T

Toddla T chronology
Skanky Skanky (2009)	FabricLive.47 (2009)	Watch Me Dance (2011)

FabricLive chronology
FabricLive.46 (2009)	FabricLive.47 (2009)	FabricLive.48 (2009)

Professional ratings
Review scores
Source	Rating
Allmusic	4/5 stars
The List	3/5 stars
Rockfeedback	2/5 stars

FabricLive.47 is a 2009 album by Toddla T (Tom Bell). The album was released as part of the FabricLive Mix Series. Bell described the album as sounding as "Sheffield sonic stylee – as if a sweaty Sheffield basement was deported to Farringdon for the night."

== Track listing ==
1. Philly - Love Action - Philly
2. Duffy - Stepping Stone (Cavemen Remix) - Universal/Polydor
3. Monkey Steak - Tigris Riddim - Steak House
4. Backyard Dog - Baddest Ruffest (Pipes & Slippers Mix) - WMI
5. Toddla T ft Mr Versatile - Fill Up Mi Portion RMX (ft Afrikan Boy & Batty Rymer) - 1965/Sony
6. Stone ft Roots Manuva - Amen - Stone Riddims
7. 3 Tracks Mixed:
  1. Toddla T ft Trigganom vs Clipz - Boom DJ from the Bristol City - 1965/Sony
  2. Toddla T - Boom DJ from the Steel City - 1965/Sony
  3. Clipz - Offline VIP - Audio Zoo
8. Toddla T ft Serocee - Manbadman (Andy George Refix) - 1965/Sony
9. 4 Tracks Mixed:
  1. Toddla T ft Serocee - Shake It (Martelo Megashake) - 1965/Sony
  2. Fish Go Deep - The Cure and the Cause - Defected
  3. Geeneus & Zinc - Emotions (Geeneus Mix) - Rinse/Ammunition
  4. La Silva - Funky Flex - Lil Silva
10. Shake Aletti - The Way he Does (Toddla T RMX ft Serocee) - Shake Aletti
11. 3 Tracks Mixed:
  1. Bart B More & Diplo vs Bashy - Millionaire Bingo - Bashy
  2. Bashy - Who Wants to be a Millionaire - Bashy
  3. Bingo Players - Get Up (Diplo Mix) - Secure
12. Drums of Death - Lonely Days (DOD's Glasgow to Sheffield Nightbus Version) - Greco/Roman
13. Alex Mills - Beyond Words (Wittyboy Remix) - Roll Deep
14. Skream - Toddla T Special - Tempa/Ammunition
15. 3 Tracks Mixed:
  1. Toddla T ft Tinchy Stryder & Mr Versatile vs Untold - Anaconda Safe
  2. Toddla T - Safe - 1965/Sony
  3. Untold - Anaconda VIP - Hessle Audio
16. 3 Tracks Mixed:
  1. Busy Signal vs Pulse X - Tic Toc (J Needles Driver Blend)
  2. Busy Signal - TicToc - VP Music
  3. Youngsta - Pulse X - DDJS Productions
17. Sticky ft Lady Chann - Sticky Situation - Unity
18. Toddla T & Oneman ft Mr Versatile - Right Leg Shuffle - Girls Music
19. Oris Jay - 4 Real - Oris Jay
20. Toddla T ft Benjamin Zephaniah & Joe Goddard - Rebel (Skream Remix) - 1965/Sony
21. Deadmau5 - I Remember (Caspa Remix) - Virgin
