= Sue Ann Carwell =

American singer/songwriter

- Also known as: Sue Ann; Sueann Carwell
- Born: Chicago, Illinois, U.S.
- Genres: Minneapolis sound, funk, R&B, blues, pop, disco, jazz, country
- Occupations: Singer, songwriter, vocals arranger
- Years active: 1978–present

Sue Ann Carwell, also known as Sue Ann, is an American singer/songwriter whose career spans more than four decades, going back to when she was an early contributor to the Minneapolis sound pioneered by Prince in the late 1970s. She recorded two albums in the 1980s – Sue Ann (1981) and Blue Velvet (1988) – with a third album, Painkiller, being released in 1992, and in 2010 an album of her original songs, called Blues In My Sunshine, featuring Jesse Johnson. In addition, Carwell has worked as a background singer with many prominent artists over the years.

== Career ==
Born in Chicago, Illinois, United States, Carwell as a young child moved with her family to St. Paul, Minnesota. She showed musical potential when she was very young, and as a teenager she began singing on the Minneapolis R&B scene, winning talent shows, and working with musicians including funk band Flyte Tyme, and the likes of Jesse Johnson. After she was spotted singing at the Elks Club by bass guitarist André Cymone, Prince attended one of her performances, and she became a protégée of his; he produced her first demo tape, but she resisted his suggestion that she used the name "Susie Stone", and recordings Prince had been working on with her for a projected 1978 album ("I'm Saving It Up", "Make It Through the Storm", "Since We've Been Together" and "Wouldn't You Love To Love Me?") were not released.

In 1981, 19-year old Carwell signed with Warner Bros. Records and released her debut album, self-titled Sue-Ann. Her second album, Blue Velvet (1988), also released using the name Sue Ann, was produced by Jesse Johnson; as noted by reviewer Justin Kantor, the album "offers generous portions of a tasty entree ... in gems like the down 'n dirty 'Fiction'; the melodic, midtempo 'Pleasure' ; and the serene, rhythmic ballad 'I'll Give You Love.' A true vocal chameleon, Sue Ann plays the sassy, no-holds-barred street diva on 'Fiction,' while she's sultry and jazzy on the Robert Brookins-produced 'Pleasure,' and straightforward and sensitive on 'I'll Give You Love.'

Reviewing Carwell's 1992 album, Painkiller (for which her full name was used), AllMusic said that it "effectively showcases her as a sassy soul diva", describing it as "an impressive offering".

In 2010, she released what the Santa Monica Mirror described as "a superb blues album of original songs": Blues In My Sunshine, featuring Jesse Johnson of The Time. The album was characterised by Casey Rain as "phenomenal".

== Discography ==
=== Solo albums ===
- 1981: Sue Ann (Warner Bros. Records)
- 1988: Blue Velvet (MCA Records)
- 1992: Painkiller (MCA Records)
- 2010: Blues In My Sunshine, featuring Jesse Johnson (Another Level Records, 789577643727)

=== Solo singles ===
- 1981: "Company" (written by Alfred Johnson and Rickie Lee Jones) – producer Pete Bellotte (Warner Bros. Records)
- 1981: "Let Me Let You Rock Me [Long Version] / Let Me Let You Rock Me" (Warner Bros. Records)
- 1981: "My Baby, My" (Warner Bros. Records; WB 17 848)
- 1988: "I'll Give You Love" (MCA Records)
- 1988: "Pleasure" (MCA Records)
- 1988: "Rock Steady" (MCA Records)
- 1992: "7 Days 7 Nights" (MCA Records)
- 1992: "Sex Or Love" (MCA Records)
- 1992: "Here 4 U"

=== Selected additional appearances ===
- 1987: Beverly Hills Cop II (soundtrack) - "I Can't Stand It"
- 1996: "Because You Loved Me" by Celine Dion – vocal arrangement, background vocals
- 1997: Much Love by Shola Ama – vocal arrangement, background vocals
- 2001: Crush by Richard Elliot
- 2001: Living Proof by Cher – backing vocals
- 2013: Purple Snow: Forecasting the Minneapolis Sound – "Should I or Should I Not?"

== Accolades ==
Carwell has featured as vocalist and vocal arranger on such notable recordings as Celine Dion's 1996 single "Because You Loved Me" (written by Diane Warren and produced by David Foster), which received Grammy Award nominations including for Best Female Pop Vocal Performance.
