= Midnite (D'Influence song) =

Single by D'Influence

from the album Prayer 4 Unity
- Released: 1995
- Genre: R&B
- Label: East West
- Songwriter(s): Kwame Kwaten, Ed Baden Powell, Sarah Anne Webb, Steve Marston
- Producer(s): D'Influence

D'Influence singles chronology
"Waiting" (1995)	"Midnite" (1995)	"Magic" (1997)

"Midnite" is a song by R&B group D'Influence issued as a single in 1995 on East West Records. The song peaked at No. 11 on the UK R&B Singles Chart and No. 24 on the UK Dance Singles Chart.

== Critical reception ==
John Bush of AllMusic called Midnite one of Prayer 4 Unity's "highlights".
