= Natasha Thomas (singer) =

Danish singer and songwriter (born 1986)

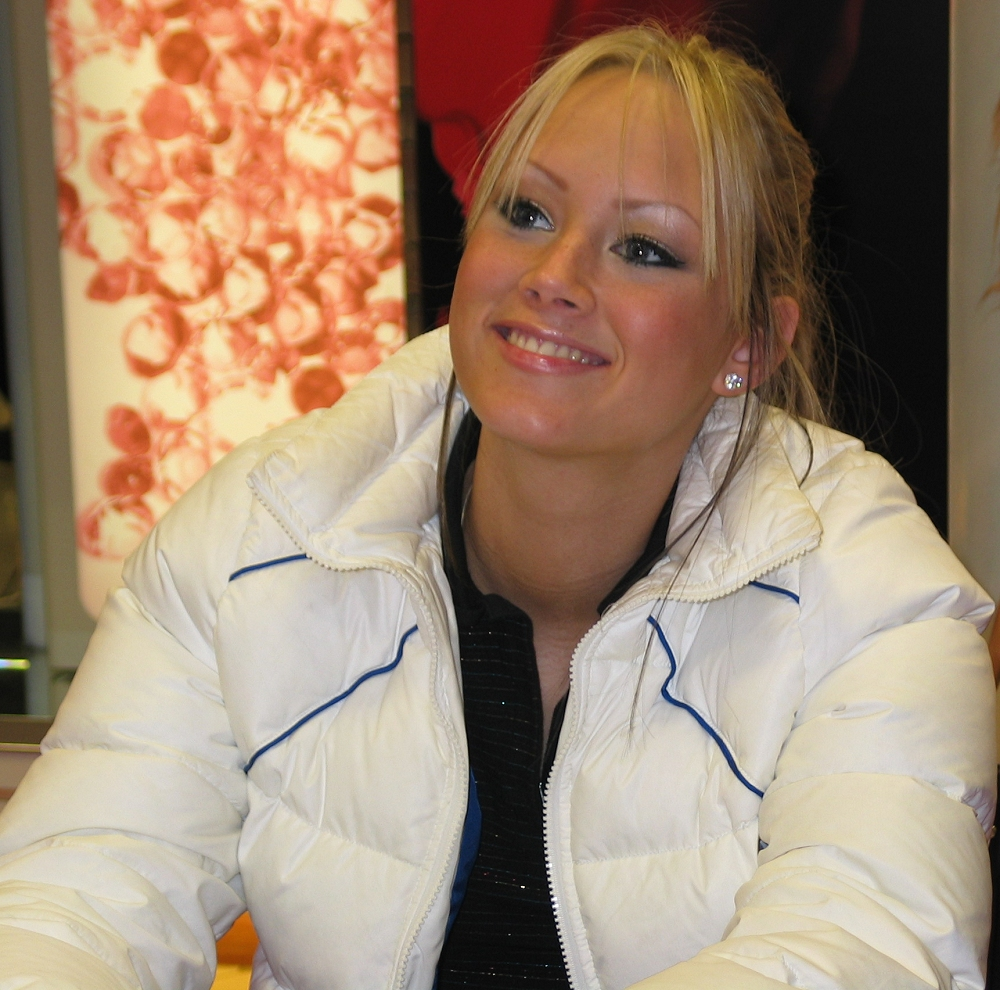
- Thomas in 2004

Background information
- Born: 27 September 1986 (age 39); Roskilde, Denmark
- Genres: Pop; Europop; dance-pop
- Occupations: Singer; songwriter; model
- Years active: 2002–2011
- Labels: Epic; ZYX

Natasha Thomas (born 27 September 1986) is a Danish singer and songwriter.

== Career ==
In 2003, at the age of 16, Thomas released her debut single "Why (Does Your Love Hurt So Much)", a cover of the Carly Simon song which reached number 40 on the German chart.

"Save Your Kisses For Me" was released at the beginning of June 2004, meeting great success, while her second single "It's Over Now" reached number 12 on the charts. The mid-tempo love song, which features the Tobagonian reggae artist Sugar Daddy, also made it into the top 20 of the airplay charts.

Thomas was later selected to represent one of the world's best-known and most important fashion labels, "Lacoste". As the new worldwide face of "Lacoste", Thomas was seen from May 2004 onwards in a pan-European print and television campaign alongside French tennis player Arnaud Clément. The advert was directed by Bruno Aveillan.

Thomas was also seen worldwide in the Lacoste's Touch of Pink fragrance print and TV ads. One of Thomas's song fragments that appeared in the TV ads was "Let Me Show You (The Way)". Touch of Pink won two FiFi Awards in Berlin in April 2005, including "People's Choice' Award for Women".

Later, Thomas broke her worldwide recording contract with Sony Music and started her own record company along with her management crew. The result of this new artistic choice was her second album "Playin' With Fire", released in 2006 and re-issued the following year to include the single "Real".

Save Your Kisses, Natasha Thomas' first album was a minor hit in some South American Countries, such as Argentina and Brazil (where it was released by Epic Records in 2004). Thomas' song "It's Over Now" was included on the Brazilian soap opera "Senhora do Destino" (English: "The Owner of Destiny") international soundtrack. Her second album "Playin' With Fire", was not released there.

In 2021, Thomas has completed an AP Degree in Multimedia Design & Communication, as well as a Bachelor’s Degree in Social Education. She continues to work on various creative projects and has also done some acting jobs.

== Discography ==
=== Studio albums ===
List of studio albums, with selected chart positions
Title	Details	Peak chart positions			
Title	Details	AUT	GER	JPN	SWI
Save Your Kisses	Released: 5 July 2004; Label: Epic; Format: CD	48	20	25	67
Playin' with Fire	Released: 23 May 2006; Label: ZYX; Formats: CD, digital download	—	—	149	—
"—" denotes a recording that did not chart or was not released in that territory.

=== Singles ===
List of singles, with selected chart positions, showing year released and album name
Title	Year	Peak chart positions					Album
Title	Year	AUT	GER	POL	SWI	UK	Album
"Why (Does Your Love Hurt So Much)"	2003	45	40	—	—	—	Save Your Kisses
"It's Over Now" (featuring Sugar Daddy)	2004	14	12	22	42	—	Save Your Kisses
"Save Your Kisses for Me"	2004	27	13	—	51	—	Save Your Kisses
"Skin Deep"	2005	—	52	—	—	54	Playin' with Fire
"Real"	2006	—	85	—	—	—	Playin' with Fire
"Solo con te" (with Tony Henry)	2009	—	—	—	—	—	Non-album singles
"Alene"	2010	—	—	—	—	—	Non-album singles
"—" denotes a recording that did not chart or was not released in that territory.

==== Promotional singles ====
Title	Year	Album
"Let Me Show You (The Way)"	2004	Save Your Kisses
