= Good 4 We =

Studio album by D'Influence
- Released: 1992
- Recorded: 1990–1992
- Genre: Jazz, R&B
- Label: East West, Acid Jazz
- Producer: Blacksmith, D'Influence

D'Influence chronology
Good 4 We (1992)	Prayer 4 Unity (1995)

Good 4 We is the debut studio album of British group D-Influence. It was released in 1992 by East West Records and Acid Jazz Records. The album was produced by D-Influence themselves, along with producers Blacksmith.

"I'm the One" was released in 1989 on Acid Jazz Records and then again in 1990. "Good Lover" was a club hit but only reached No. 66 on the official top 40. However, it was ranked No. 7 on the Blues & Soul all-time top 20 songs. The group embarked on a tour, entitled, Good 4 We. The tour saw the band perform across the world at over 150 shows. They appeared on the first-ever Later with Jools Holland show and toured with Michael Jackson and Prince in promotion for the album. This culminated in the band winning 'Best Live Band' at the UK Black Music Awards.

== Critical reception ==
Professional ratings
Review scores
Source	Rating
AllMusic	3/5 stars

AllMusic gave the album a three out of five star rating. Sonia Murray of the Atlanta Journal Constitution favourably found that "Under the obvious influence of such over-the-seas soul stirrers as Loose Ends and Soul II Soul (with Caron Wheeler), London-based quartet D-Influence hits these shores with an exciting debut that pays tribute to what many rhythm and blues acts of today have regrettably left behind: lyrical content and live instrumentation.".

== Singles ==
The band's most recognized song, "Good Lover", was written when the band were in Milo Studios. The label was asking for a hit and the band hated being asked for just that. They stayed in the studio, did an all-nighter then at 3 am, lead singer Sarah Webb sang the lines that launched the song. "Good Lover" was played across that summer.

"Good Lover" reached No. 11 on the Blues & Soul Top British Soul Singles chart.

== Track listing ==
Good 4 We track listing
No.	Title	Writer(s)	Length
1.	"Good Lover"	Ed Baden Powell, G. Worthy, Kwame Kwaten, L. Wedgeworth, Ned Bigham, Sarah Webb, Steve Marston	4:56
2.	"I'm the One"	B. Fowler, B. Laswell, Ed Baden Powell, Kwame Kwaten, M. Beinhorn, Ned Bigham, Sarah Webb, Steve Marston	3:50
3.	"Funny (How Things Change)"	Ed Baden Powell, Kwame Kwaten, Ned Bigham, Sarah Webb, Steve Marston	5:23
4.	"Good 4 We"	Ed Baden Powell, Kwame Kwaten, Ned Bigham, Sarah Webb, Steve Marston	5:04
5.	"No Illusions"	Ed Baden Powell, Kwame Kwaten, Ned Bigham, Sarah Webb, Steve Marston	5:27
6.	"Journey"	Ed Baden Powell, Kwame Kwaten, Sarah Webb, Steve Marston	4:57
7.	"Changes"	Ed Baden Powell, Kwame Kwaten, Ned Bigham, Sarah Webb, Steve Marston	4:50
8.	"For You I Sing This Song"	Ed Baden Powell, Kwame Kwaten, Sarah Webb, Steve Marston	6:28
9.	"Sweetest Things"	Ed Baden Powell, Kwame Kwaten, Sarah Webb, Steve Marston	6:26
