= Imagine (Shola Ama song) =

Single by Shola Ama

from the album In Return
- Released: 2000
- Genre: UK garage (remixes)
- Label: WEA, Freakstreet
- Songwriters: Fred Jerkins III, Harvey Mason Jr., LaShawn Daniels, Shola Ama
- Producer: Fred Jerkins III

Shola Ama singles chronology
"Still Believe" (1999)	"Imagine" (2000)	"Feels So Good" (2001)

"Imagine" is a song by English singer Shola Ama, released as the second single from her 1999 second studio album In Return. It was produced by Fred Jerkins III and written by Jerkins, Harvey Mason Jr., LaShawn Daniels, and Ama. In April 2000, the song reached number 24 on the UK Singles Chart and number one on the UK Dance Singles Chart due to the garage remix by Club Asylum. NME included the remix of "Imagine" in their "25 essential UK garage anthems" list.

== Track listings ==
UK CD single

1. "Imagine" (Darkchild radio edit) – 3:47
2. "Imagine" (D'Influence Futurama mix) – 6:10
3. "Imagine" (Spa remix radio edit) – 3:45
4. "Imagine" (Curtis Lynch Jnr Wicked remix) – 3:46

UK 12-inch single

A1. "Imagine" (Darkchild radio edit) – 3:47
A2. "Imagine" (Spa remix radio edit) – 3:45
B1. "Imagine" (Asylum remix) – 5:42
B2. "Imagine" (Curtis Lynch Jnr Wicked remix) – 3:46

UK 12-inch ("Imagine (The Garage Mixes Including Asylum Mix)")

A1. "Imagine" (Asylum remix) – 5:42
A2. "Imagine" (Asylum dub) – 5:40
B. "Imagine" (Ed Case and Carl H remix) – 5:26

UK 12-inch ("Imagine (The Garage Remixes)")

A1. "Imagine" (Asylum Steppers vocal mix)
A2. "Imagine" (Ed Case & Carl H remix)
B1. "Imagine" (The Asylum remix)
B2. "Imagine" (The Asylum dub)

== Charts ==
Chart (2000)	Peak position
Scottish Singles Sales (Official Charts)	64
UK Singles (Official Charts)	24
UK Dance (Official Charts)	1
UK Hip Hop/R&B (Official Charts)	8

=== Year-end charts ===
Chart (2000)	Position
UK Urban (Music Week)	13

== Certifications ==
Region	Certification	Certified units/sales
United Kingdom (BPI)	Silver	200,000^{‡}
^{‡} Sales+streaming figures based on certification alone.
