= Prayer 4 Unity =

Studio album by D'Influence
- Released: 1995
- Studio: Bastcote Studios, London, England Courtyard Studios, Oxford, England D-Lab Falconer Studios, London, England Front Row South, London, England Funky Slice, New York, NY Jamestown Studios, Longon, England Milo Studios, London, England R.A.K., London, England Radio Station, Brasilia, Brazil The Garden, London, England
- Genre: Jazz, R&B
- Length: 56:36
- Label: East West
- Producer: D'Influence

D'Influence chronology
Good 4 We (1992)	Prayer 4 Unity (1995)	London (1997)

Prayer 4 Unity is the second studio album by British group D-Influence, released in 1995 by East West Records. The album reached No. 17 on the UK R&B Albums Chart.

== Critical reception ==
Professional ratings
Review scores
Source	Rating
AllMusic	3/5 stars
NME	5/10

With a 3 out of 5 star rating, John Bush of AllMusic declared, "D-Influence's sophomore album continues the group's trip through funky house rhythms, with Sarah Ann Webb's vocals." Andy Gill of The Independent, praised the album saying, "With Prayer 4 Unity, D-Influence supersede their own influences in fine style."

== Singles ==
A song from the album, called "Midnite", reached No. 11 on the UK R&B Singles Chart and No. 24 on the UK Dance Singles Chart. Another single, "Waiting", peaked at No. 26 on the UK R&B Singles Chart.

== Track listing ==
Prayer 4 Unity track listing
No.	Title	Writer(s)	Length
1.	"Midnite"	Ed Baden Powell, Kwame Kwaten, Sarah Webb, Steve Marston	4:43
2.	"Phuncky Times"	Ed Baden Powell, Kwame Kwaten, Sarah Webb, Steve Marston	6:49
3.	"Waiting"	Ed Baden Powell, Kwame Kwaten, Sarah Webb, Steve Marston	4:58
4.	"Simmer Down"	Ed Baden Powell, Kwame Kwaten, Sarah Webb, Steve Marston	4:57
5.	"Always"	Ed Baden Powell, Kwame Kwaten, Sarah Webb, Steve Marston	6:28
6.	"Should I?"	Ed Baden Powell, Kwame Kwaten, Sarah Webb, Steve Marston	4:46
7.	"I Will"	Ed Baden Powell, Kwame Kwaten, Sarah Webb, Steve Marston	5:04
8.	"Break Up"	Ed Baden Powell, Kwame Kwaten, Sarah Webb, Steve Marston	4:38
9.	"Prayer 4 Unity"	Ed Baden Powell, Kwame Kwaten, Sarah Webb, Steve Marston	5:11
10.	"Brasilia Interview [Interlude)"	Ed Baden Powell, Kwame Kwaten, Sarah Webb, Steve Marston	0:16
11.	"Afrojam"	Ed Baden Powell, Kwame Kwaten, Sarah Webb, Steve Marston	4:56
12.	"You're All I Need"	Ed Baden Powell, Kwame Kwaten, Sarah Webb, Steve Marston	3:50

== Charts ==
Chart performance for Prayer 4 Unity
Chart (1995)	Peak position
UK Albums Chart	98
UK R&B Albums Chart	17
