= Wittyboy =

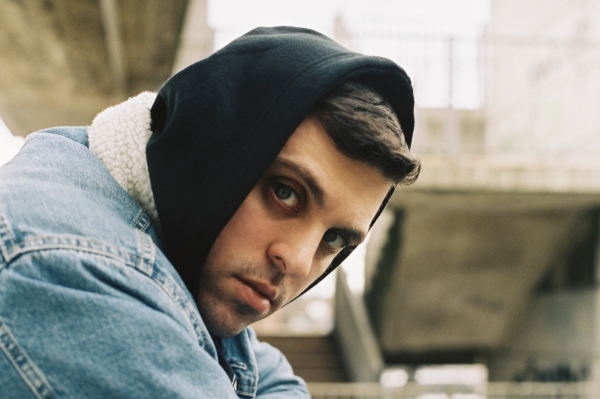

Background information
- Born: Duwaine Whitfield; September 11, 1984 (age 41); Leeds, West Yorkshire, England
- Genres: UK garage; house; bassline house
- Occupations: DJ, record producer
- Instruments: Keyboard, turntables, programming
- Years active: 2005–present
- Label: Ministry of Sound

Duwaine Whitfield, better known by the stage name Wittyboy, is a British DJ, record producer and remixer from Leeds, West Yorkshire, England.

== Early life ==
Whitfield was raised in Leeds where he was influenced by a mix of speed garage, grime, hip hop, house and dancehall from an early age. He began to gain support on national radio stations along with regular nightclub performances within the bassline scene.

== Music career ==
After a number of successful underground releases, Wittyboy was given his first major label opportunity, remixing singer Estelle's "No Substitute Love" (Atlantic Records). Wittyboy continued to grow his remix portfolio working with the likes of Nitin Sawhney featuring Roxanne Tataei on his remix of "Distant Dreams" (Cooking Vinyl), followed by his remix of Craig David's "Are You Up for This" (Ice Cream Records) and Jodie Aysha's "Pozer (Zer Zer Zer)" (All Around the World Productions). Wittyboy has been featured on a number of compilations such as Nitin Sawhney's London Undersound and Instrumentals, Pure Garage Rewind: Back to the Old Skool and Pure Bassline, both mixed by DJ EZ (Warner Music UK), Ministry of Sound's The Sound of Bassline series and Fabric Live 47. Wittyboy has been featured in numerous publications such as Complex Vibrations Magazine, DJ Mag, issue 80 of RWD Magazine, and Zap Bang Magazine.

== Discography ==
=== Compilation album appearances ===
Album title	Album details	Track title
Pure Garage Rewind: Back to the Old Skool	Released 3 Dec (2007); Warner Music UK Ltd.	Wittyboy - "Iron Man"
Pure Garage Presents: Pure Bassline	Released 21 Jul (2008); Warner Music UK Ltd.	Ear Dis - "I Feel (Wittyboy Remix)"; Wittyboy & Pyper - "Hungry Giant"
Ministry of Sound: The Sound of Bassline	Released 24 February (2008); Ministry of Sound Recordings Ltd	Wittyboy feat. Lauren Mason - "PS"; Nastee Boi feat. E Man - "Mussy Mad (Wittyboy Remix)"
Ministry of Sound: The Sound of Bassline 2	Released 18 January (2009); Ministry of Sound Recordings Ltd	E17 vs Wittyboy - "Trouble"; Alex Mills - "Beyond Words (Wittyboy Remix)"
DJ Cameo Presents Bassline, Vol. 1	Released 31 March (2008); Gut Records Ltd	Ear Dis - "I Feel (Wittyboy Remix)"; Wittyboy - "World War Three"; Alex Mills - "Beyond Words (Wittyboy Remix)"
FabricLive.47: Mixed by Toddla T	Released Aug (2009); Fabric	Alex Mills - "Beyond Words (Wittyboy Remix)"
Nitin Sawhney London Undersound - Instrumentals and Remixes	Released 12 Oct (2009); Cooking Vinyl	Nitin Sawhney feat. Roxanne Tataei - "Distant Dreams (Wittyboy Remix)"
Rinse:05 Paleface	Released 28 Jul (2008); Rinse Recordings	Wittyboy - "Intent 2 Feel"; Wittyboy & Pyper feat. Kyla - "Think About You (Keynos Refix)"; Wittyboy - "Get Ya Tits Out"

=== EPs ===
- Witty Boy EP, Northern Line Records (2007)
- Danger EP, Northern Line Records (2007)
- Music Hustler EP, Music Hustler Records (2007)
- So Happy & Seductive, Illusive Entertainment (2008)
- Broken Silence EP, Wittyboy Music (2013)
- The Shakedown EP, Chip Butty Records (2016)
- Narcos EP, Wittyboy Music (2019)

=== Singles ===
- "Kiss My Eyes" (2007)
- "Conversations" (2007)
- "Bad Dreams" (2007)
- "Iron Man" (2007)
- "Murder Charge" (2007)
- "Nacho Riddim" (2007)
- "Iron Man VIP" (2007)
- "Spanish Rose" (2007)
- "Attention" (2008)
- "Stupid Games" (2008)
- "Danger" (2008)
- "World War 3" (2008)
- "So Happy" (2008)
- "Seductive" (2008)
- "Hungry Giant" (2008)
- "Bubble & Tweak" (2013)
- "Running to You" (2013)
- "Without You" (2013)
- "The Shakedown" (2016)
- "Warlord" (2016)
- "Backup Plan" (2016)

=== Remixes ===
- Mutya Buena – "Just a Little Bit" (Wittyboy Remix) (2007)
- Craig David – "Are You Up for This" (Wittyboy Remix) (2008)
- Craig David feat. Tinchy Stryder – "Where's Your Love" (Wittyboy Remix) (2008)
- Sticky featuring Courtney Dennie – "I'm in Love" (Wittyboy Remix) (2008)
- Ear Dis – "I Feel" (Wittyboy Remix) (2008)
- Roll Deep feat. Janee – "Do Me Wrong" (Wittyboy Remix) (2008)
- Spoonface – "Pon Me Sofa" (Wittyboy Remix) (2008)
- Nitin Sawhney – "Distant Dreams" (feat. Roxanne Tataei) (Wittyboy Remix) (2008)
- Estelle – "No Substitute Love" (Wittyboy Remix) (2008)
- Leon Jean-Marie – "Bring It On" (Wittyboy Remix) (2008)
- Cotti feat. Doctor – "Calm Down" (Wittyboy Remix) (2008)
- DJ Matchstick & Erica Iji – "It's Over" (Wittyboy Remix) (2008)
- Alex Mills – "Beyond Words" (Wittyboy Remix) (2008)
- Toddla T & Herve feat. Serocee – "Shake It" (Wittyboy Remix) (2009)
- East 17 vs Witty Boy – "Trouble" (2009)
- Rainboy – "Woman of the Wind" (Wittyboy Remix) (2009)
- Lauren Mason - "P.S" (Wittyboy Remix) (2009)
- Jodie Aysha – "Pozer (Zer Zer Zer)" (Wittyboy Remix) (2010)
- I Haunt Wizards – "Flowers Bloom" (Wittyboy Remix) (2010)
- Serocee – "Oh Na Na" (Wittyboy Remix) (2011)
