= In Return (Shola Ama album) =

Studio album by Shola Ama
- Released: 8 November 1999
- Genre: Pop, R&B
- Length: 71:18
- Label: Freakstreet; WEA
- Producer: Stargate; Fred Jerkins III; D'Influence; Ali Shaheed Muhammad; Shaun LaBelle; Paul Waller; Wayne Laws; Bradley Spalter; Soulshock and Karlin

Shola Ama chronology
Much Love (1997)	In Return (1999)	Supersonic (2002)

Singles from In Return
- 1. "Still Believe" Released: 25 October 1999; 2. "Imagine" Released: 2000

In Return is the second studio album by British singer Shola Ama. It was released by Freakstreet and WEA on 8 November 1999. The album saw Ama working with various producers such as Fred Jerkins III, Stargate, Soulshock and Karlin, and Ali Shaheed Muhammad. Ama would also co-write some of the songs on the album, along with Angie Stone, Babyface, and David Foster. Two singles were released from the album, "Still Believe" and "Imagine," both of which reached the top thirty of the UK Singles Chart.

The album received generally positive reviews, with critics praising its polished pop sound, stylistic variety, and Ama's sincere, emotive vocals, though some noted a mismatch between its quality and its commercial impact. Despite this reception, the album achieved only modest chart success, peaking at number 57 in France and missing the top 100 in Germany and the UK, and a planned US release was ultimately canceled, after which Ama took a break from recording.

== Promotion ==
The album would be led off by the single "Still Believe," which reached the top 10 in France. However, it would chart moderately elsewhere, charting at number 26 in the UK. The second single taken from In Return, "Imagine," was released in 2000. It would prove to chart moderately like the previous single from the album, reaching number 24 in the UK. However, the single would reach the top spot on the country's dance charts. In further support of the album, Ama would join Warner Music executives to celebrate the release of In Return in the St. Martin's Hotel in London.

== Critical reception ==
Professional ratings
Review scores
Source	Rating
AllMusic	3/5 stars
The Independent	3/5 stars

In Return earned generally positive reviews from music critics. Bryan Buss from AllMusic wrote that "sounding like a cross between Janet Jackson and Emilia, but with softer, more girlish, and more developed vocals, Ama's new CD is packed with pop songs perfectly tailored for 2000 [...] She sings with sincerity and conviction, often sounding like a heartbroken angel. With only hints of R&B, this is far more a pop album than anything else, though, despite the sheen, it isn't just for teenagers. This is good, old pop, a throwback to '60s girl groups with a contemporary twist." The Independent's Tim Perry found that "Ama's second album sees her on good poppy form, incorporating gospel, funk and swing styles." A review from Billboard's Kwaku named the album a "quality product [with] poor sales".

UK garage remixes of "Imagine" and "Run to Me" by Club Asylum would prove popular. NME later included the remix of "Imagine" in their "25 essential UK garage anthems" list, highlighting the "grubby bassline". Capital Xtra also included the remix of "Run to Me" in their list of "The Best Old-School Garage Anthems of All Time".

== Commercial performance ==
Commercially, In Return achieved only modest success. It failed to break into the top 100 in both Germany and the United Kingdom, with its strongest performance occurring in France, where it peaked at number 57 on the French Albums Chart. Plans were made for a United States release in 2000, and Ama expressed optimism about her potential to cross over into that market. However, the release ultimately did not materialize. In the aftermath, she stepped away from recording for a period.

== Track listing ==
In Return – standard edition
No.	Title	Writer(s)	Producer(s)	Length
1.	"Still Believe"	Hallgeir Rustan; Mikkel Storleer Eriksen	Stargate	4:12
2.	"Imagine"	Shola Ama; Fred Jerkins III; LaShawn Daniels; Harvey Mason, Jr.	Jerkins	4:19
3.	"Deepest Hurt"	M. Redbone; A. Whittby; T. Faragher	Ed Baden-Powell; Kwame Kwaten; Steve Marston	4:52
4.	"Lovely Affair"	Ama; Angie Stone; Ali Shaheed Muhammad	Muhammad	4:06
5.	"Run to Me"	Ama; Baden-Powell; Kwaten; Marston	Baden-Powell; Kwaten; Marston	4:03
6.	"My Heart"	Ama; Stevie Bensusen; Shaun LaBelle	LaBelle	4:39
7.	"Everything"	Paul Waller; Greg Lester	Waller	4:26
8.	"Can't Have You"	Ama; Jerkins; Daniels; Mason	Jerkins	3:56
9.	"This Time Next Year"	Kenneth Edmonds; David Foster	D'Influence	4:20
10.	"Surrender"	Ama; Yana Johnson; Baden-Powell; Kwaten; Marston	Baden-Powell; Kwaten; Marston	5:08
11.	"That Thing"	Wayne Lawes; Rickardo Reid; Ama; Johnson	Lawes; Stargate	4:24
12.	"In Return"	Bradley Spalter; Jason Edmonds; Mark Tabbs	Spalter	4:26
13.	"He Don't Know"	Bensusen; LaBelle; Lil Roger	LaBelle	3:58
14.	"Queen for a Day"	Ama; Rustan; Eriksen; Tor Erik Hermansen	Stargate	3:37
15.	"Superficial Fantasy"	Ama; Sarah Ann Webb; Baden-Powell; Kwaten; Marston	Baden-Powell; Kwaten; Marston	6:43
16.	"Can't Go On"	Carsten Schack; Kenneth Karlin; Anthem	Soulshock and Karlin	4:09
Total length:				71:18

In Return – Japanese edition
No.	Title	Writer(s)	Producer(s)	Length
17.	"Keepin' It Real"	Ama; Baden-Powell; Kwaten; Marston; Johnson	D'Influence	4:05
18.	"Still Believe (Stargate Mix)"	Rustan; Eriksen	Stargate

== Charts ==
Chart (1999)	Peak position
French Albums (SNEP)	57
German Albums (Offizielle Top 100)	97
UK Albums (OCC)	92

== Release history ==
List of release dates, showing region, formats, label, and reference
Region	Date	Format	Label	Ref.
United Kingdom	8 November 1999	CD; cassette	Freakstreet; WEA	
Japan	10 December 1999	CD; cassette	WEA	
