= It's Over Now =

It's Over Now may refer to:

- "It's Over Now" (112 song), 2000
- "It's Over Now" (Cause & Effect song), 1994
- "It's Over Now" (Deborah Cox song), 1999
- "It's Over Now" (Jeanette song), 2003
- "It's Over Now" (Luther Vandross song), 1985
- "Well You Needn't", a 1944 jazz standard written by Thelonious Monk, sometimes recorded under the title "It's Over Now" with lyrics written by Mike Ferro in the 1970s
- "It's Over Now", a song by The Beach Boys from the album Good Vibrations: Thirty Years of The Beach Boys
- "It's Over Now", a song by Natasha Thomas from the album Save Your Kisses
- "It's Over Now", a song by Ultra Naté from the album Blue Notes in the Basement

== See also ==
- "It's All Over Now", a song written by Bobby Womack and Shirley Womack
