= London (D'Influence album) =

Studio album by D'Influence
- Released: 1997
- Genre: Jazz, R&B
- Length: 1:56:47
- Label: Echo
- Producer: D'Influence

D'Influence chronology
Prayer 4 Unity (1995)	London (1997)

London is the third studio album by British group D-Influence released in 1997 by Echo Records. The album reached No. 8 on the UK R&B Albums chart and No. 6 on the UK Independent Albums chart.

== Singles ==
"Hypnotize" peaked at No. 33 on the UK Pop Singles Chart, No. 3 on the UK Dance Singles Chart and No. 8 on the UK R&B Singles Chart. Another single, "Magic", reached No. 19 on the UK Dance Singles Chart, No. 13 on the UK R&B Singles Chart and No. 19 on the UK Independent Singles Chart.

== Critical reception ==
Professional ratings
Review scores
Source	Rating
AllMusic	4/5 stars

John Bush of AllMusic in praise wrote "More of a soul band than similar British outfits (Jamiroquai, Brand New Heavies, and Galliano), D'Influence uses their third album to expand the sound into several different directions, including stabs at rapping, gospel, and even salsa. Surprisingly, the genre-crossing works quite well, thanks mostly to the sweet vocals of Sara Ann Webb."

== Track listing ==
No.	Title	Writer(s)	Length
1.	"Hypnotize"	Ed Baden-Powell, Kwame Kwaten, Stephan Marston, Stan Webb	4:12
2.	"Good Life"	Ed Baden-Powell, Kwame Kwaten, Stephan Marston, Stan Webb	4:18
3.	"Shake It"	Ed Baden-Powell, Kwame Kwaten, Stephan Marston, Stan Webb	5:08
4.	"I've Got My Mind Made Up"	Ed Baden-Powell, Kwame Kwaten, Stephan Marston, Stan Webb	5:47
5.	"Magic"	Ed Baden-Powell, Kwame Kwaten, Stephan Marston, Stan Webb	4:38
6.	"Hold On"	Ed Baden-Powell, Kwame Kwaten, Stephan Marston, Stan Webb	6:13
7.	"Good Morning Heartache"	Ed Baden-Powell, Kwame Kwaten, Stephan Marston, Stan Webb	3:14
8.	"Are You with Me?"	Ed Baden-Powell, Kwame Kwaten, Stephan Marston, Stan Webb	4:03
9.	"Lonely"	Ed Baden-Powell, Kwame Kwaten, Stephan Marston, Stan Webb	1:36
10.	"There Can Be"	Ed Baden-Powell, Kwame Kwaten, Stephan Marston, Stan Webb	4:46
11.	"Running Away"	Ed Baden-Powell, Kwame Kwaten, Stephan Marston, Stan Webb	5:59
12.	"Falling"	Ed Baden-Powell, Kwame Kwaten, Stephan Marston, Stan Webb	4:05

== Charts ==
Chart performance for London
Chart (1997)	Peak position
UK Albums Chart	58
UK R&B Albums Chart	8
UK Independent Albums Chart	6
