= Playin' with Fire =

Playin' With Fire

Studio album by Natasha Thomas
- Released: May 23, 2006
- Genres: Pop, R&B
- Labels: ZYX Music, Polydor Japan

Natasha Thomas chronology
Save Your Kisses (2004)	Playin' With Fire (2006)

Alternative covers
- Re-issue cover

Alternative cover
- Japanese Cover

Playin' with Fire is the second album of Danish singer Natasha Thomas. It's her first with ZYX Music after she had broken her worldwide contract with Sony BMG, causing lack of promotion and scarce release. The album was released only in Denmark, Germany and Japan. It was not released in Latin America, where her previous album was a minor hit, with the song "Save Your Kisses for Me".

== Track listing ==
Standard Edition

1. "Over"
2. "Playin' with Fire" (feat. Andy Love)
3. "Skin Deep"
4. "What Up" (feat. Maximum)
5. "Curious" (feat. Triple C.)
6. "Secret" (feat. Johnny Allen)
7. "Touched Another Girl"
8. "I Don't Need You To"
9. "Stop"
10. "Irresistible"
11. "Shoulda Neva"
12. "Chasing Love"
13. "Show Me What You Got" (feat. Garoo)
14. "State of Mind"
15. "Your Love Carries Me" (Pinnelli Remix)

Reissue

1. "Over"
2. "Real" (Rap Version)
3. "Playin' with Fire" (feat. Andy Love)
4. "State of Mind"
5. "Curious" (feat. Triple C.)
6. "Secret" (feat. Johnny Allen)
7. "Skin Deep"
8. "Irresistible"
9. "I Don't Need You To"
10. "What Up" (feat. Maximum)
11. "Touched Another Girl"
12. "Shoulda Neva"
13. "Chasing Love"
14. "Stop"
15. "Show Me What You Got" (feat. Garoo)
16. "Your Love Carries Me"
17. "Skin Deep (R&B Version)" (Japanese Edition Bonus Track)
18. "Irresistible (DJ Kaori Dirty South Remix)" (Japanese Edition Bonus Track)

== Single ==
Information
"Skin Deep"
- Released: 18 November 2005
- Chart positions:
  #52 (Germany)
  #54 (UK)

== Release history ==
Region	Date
Germany	May 23, 2006
Japan	June 15, 2006
