= Taboo (Glamma Kid song) =

1999 single by Glamma Kid

Single by Glamma Kid featuring Shola Ama

from the album Kidology
- Released: 5 April 1999
- Genre: Dancehall
- Label: WEA, FutureFlex
- Songwriters: Iyael Constable, Sade Adu, Martin Ditcham
- Producer: Karl Gordon

Glamma Kid singles chronology
"Fashion '98" (1998)	"Taboo" (1999)	"Much Love" (1999)

"Taboo" is a song by British dancehall musician Glamma Kid featuring English singer Shola Ama. It was released on 5 April 1999 as the third single from the debut album Kidology. A top 10 hit, the song peaked at No. 10 on the UK Singles Chart, and No. 1 on the UK Dance Singles Chart. The song also charted in the Netherlands and New Zealand, peaking at numbers 26 and 22, respectively. In France, it peaked at No. 78. The song interpolates the 1985 Sade hit "The Sweetest Taboo".

The 'MJ Cole Full Vocal Mix', a garage remix by MJ Cole, proved popular in the UK garage scene in 1999. Mixmag included this remix in their list of "16 of the Best Uplifting Vocal Garage Tracks".

== Track listing ==
CD single

1. "Taboo" (Video Mix) – 3:28
2. "Taboo" (Stargate R'n'B Mix) – 4:07
3. "Taboo" (Clarkey & Blakey Mix) – 4:40
4. "Taboo" (MJ Cole Full Vocal Mix) – 5:26

12" single
A1. "Taboo" (Original Mix) – 5:00
A2. "Taboo" (Stargate R'n'B Mix) – 4:07
B1. "Taboo" (MJ Cole Vocal Dub) – 6:13
B2. "Taboo" (Dave Kelly Mix) – 3:49

== Charts ==
=== Weekly charts ===
Chart performance for "Taboo"
Chart (1999)	Peak position
France (SNEP)	78
Netherlands (Single Top 100)	26
New Zealand (Recorded Music NZ)	22
UK Singles (Official Charts)	10

=== Year-end charts ===
Chart (1999)	Position
Netherlands (Dutch Top 40)	159
