= Watch Me Dance =

Studio album by Toddla T
- Released: 7 July 2011 (digital); 22 August 2011 (physical)
- Genre: Hip hop, UK garage, dancehall
- Label: Ninja Tune

Toddla T chronology
Skanky Skanky (2009)	Watch Me Dance (2011)	Foreign Lights (2017)

Watch Me Dance is the second album by British musician Toddla T. It features collaborations from artists including Shola Ama and Roots Manuva. Two singles were released from the album, "Take It Back" featuring Shola Ama and "Watch Me Dance" featuring Roots Manuva.

== Leak ==
The album was leaked in July 2011, probably by a German magazine which had had advance access to it. Ninja Tune stated that this would "seriously affect the ability to make any kind of financial return" from the album.

== Track listing ==
No.	Title	Length
1.	"Watch Me Dance" (featuring Roots Manuva)	4:21
2.	"Take It Back" (featuring Shola Ama & J2K)	3:15
3.	"Cruise Control"	3:27
4.	"Cherry Picking" (featuring Róisín Murphy)	3:29
5.	"Streets So Warm" (featuring Wayne Marshall & Skream)	4:37
6.	"Badman Flu"	3:20
7.	"Body Good"	3:06
8.	"How Beautiful It Would Be"	3:45
9.	"Lovely Girl"	3:57
10.	"Do It Your Way"	3:30
11.	"Fly"	4:04
12.	"Ain't Nowt Going Back" (iTunes bonus track)	3:18
