= Turley Richards =

Musical artist (born 1941)

- Born: Charleston, West Virginia, United States
- Genres: Folk, rock, disco, funk, rhythm and blues
- Occupations: Singer, musician
- Instruments: Vocals, guitar
- Years active: 1959–present
- Labels: Fraternity, MGM, 20th Century Fox, Columbia, Warner Bros., Silba, Epic, Atlantic, Vitag, Kiongazi Music
- Member of: Harmonious Funk
- Formerly of: The Five Pearls, The Kingsmen, The Greg Foresman Band
- Website: Turley's Place

Turley Richards (born Richard Curtis Turley; June 12, 1941) is an American singer, songwriter, and guitarist.

Richards was born in Charleston, West Virginia. He was blinded in the left eye at the age of four in an archery accident and lost sight in the right eye as well at the age of twenty-nine. He began playing in a group called The Five Pearls while still a teen in the 1950s.

His first appearance on record was in 1959, a single titled "All About Ann", released on label Fraternity Records. "Makin' Love With My Baby", also released by Fraternity Records, followed later that year. Richards was named a Rockabilly Legend in the Rockabilly Hall of Fame for this song.

He moved to Los Angeles with an ensemble in the early 1960s, but his band failed and he returned to West Virginia. Later in the 1960s he moved to New York City, playing upper East Side bars and eventually finding success. He toured with The Kingsmen in 1967 and appeared on The Johnny Carson Show in 1969 performing "Summertime". Known as the "West Virginia Superstar", his debut album was released on Warner Bros. Records in 1970, and he scored two minor hit singles in the early 1970s. Further releases followed later in the decade, as did a third hit in 1980.

Richards made the first recording of Tom Snow and Nan O'Byrne's "You Might Need Somebody", which was subsequently a UK hit twice, reaching No. 11 for Randy Crawford in 1981 and No. 4 for Shola Ama in 1997.

His autobiography, Blindsighted, was published in 2014. Richards resides in the Louisville, Kentucky area where he still performs. He also acts a vocal coach with some of his students making it to the finals of The Voice and American Idol.

== Discography ==
=== Albums ===
- 1965: The Many Souls of Turley Richards (20th Century Fox)
- 1970: Turley Richards (Warner Bros.)
- 1971: Expressions (Warner Bros.)
- 1972: From Darkness to Light (Silba) (Note: Live concert at Bellarmine College.)
- 1976: West Virginia Superstar (Epic)
- 1979: Therfu (Atlantic) (Note: Produced by Mick Fleetwood. Cover art by Lindsay Buckingham also used for 2014 autobiography cover.)
- 2007: A Matter of Faith (Kiongazi)
- 2007: Back to My Roots (Kiongazi)
- 2008: BlindSighted (Kiongazi) (Note: A 6-song CD with the same title was included with his 2014 autobiography.)

=== Singles ===
As Richard Turley

- 1959: "All About Ann" / "Makin' Love with My Baby" (Fraternity) (Note: With the All American Boy's Orchestra.)
- 1959: "Since I Met You" / "I Wanna Dance" (Fraternity) (Note: With Gary Hawks and the Travelers.)
- 1961: "I Wanna Dance" / "Since I Met You" (Dot)

As Turley Richards

- 1964: "Since You've Been Gone" / "What's Your Name" (MGM)
- 1965: "I Need to Fall in Love" / "Shout" (20th Century Fox)
- 1966: "Crazy Arms" / "I Just Can't Take It Any Longer" (Columbia)
- 1966: "I Feel Alright" / "I Can't Get Back Home to My Baby" (Columbia)
- 1967: "I'm a Lonely Man" / "I Can't Get Back Home to My Baby" (Columbia)
- 1968: "This is My Woman" / "Everything's Goin' For Me" (Kapp)
- 1968: "Such a Wonderful Feeling" / "Don't Tell Me It's Raining" (Kapp)
- 1969: "Freedom Mountain" / "Tomorrow Will Never Come" (Warner Bros.)
- 1970: "Love Minus Zero-No Limit" / "Gone from Yesterday" (Warner Bros.) - US #84, CAN #70, AUS #96
- 1970: "I Heard the Voice of Jesus" / "Then I'll Go Away" (Warner Bros.) - US #99
- 1970: "Child of Mine" / "Maybe I Can Change My Mind" (Warner Bros.) - AUS #83
- 1971: "The Last Day" / "Train Back to Mama (Broken Dreams)" (Warner Bros.)
- 1971: "It's All Over Now, Baby Blue" / "Virginia Woman" (Warner Bros.)
- 1971: "One Too Many Mornings" / "Beautiful Country" (Warner Bros.)
- 1976: "West Virginia Superstar" / "Happy" (Epic)
- 1978: "Under the Boardwalk" / "Holy Holy" (Epic)
- 1979: "You Might Need Somebody" / "It's All Up to You" (Atlantic) - US #54
- 1980: "Stand by Me" / "All Over The World" (Atlantic)

=== EPs ===
- 1984: Skin Fever (Vitag) (Note: Includes "Skin Fever (Extended Dance Version)", "Skin Fever (Edited Version)", and "Skin Fever (Instrumental)".)

=== Appearances ===
U.S. releases only. (Note: Multiple appearances on compilations released in Germany, France, UK, Venezuela, Japan, and Uruguay.)

- 1970: Looney Tunes and Merrie Melodies: "I Heard the Voice of Jesus" (Warner Bros.)
- 1973: Because I Am: "Because I Am" (Clearlight)
- 1976: It's A Knockout Round 2: "West Virginia Superstar" (Epic)
- 2000: The Gospel According to Austin, Tx: "I Heard the Voice of Jesus" (Kickbutt Gospel)

=== Producer ===
Albums

- 1972: Turley Richards - From Darkness to Light (Silba)
- 1975: Country Folk – Down To Earth (Mugtime)
- 1981: Ed Raetzloff – Drivin' Wheels (NewPax)
- 1982: James Ward – Faith Takes a Vision (Lamb & Lion)
- 1983: Carman – Sunday's on the Way (Priority)
- 1985: Stark Raven – One Hundred Million Reasons (Vitag)
- 1981: Brown Bannister – Talk to One Another (NewPax) (Note: Co-producer; reissued in 1986 on Reunion.)
- 19??: Len Loyd, Jr. – Lenny (none)

Singles

- 1972: Denny Lile – "Hear the Bang" / "If You Stay on Solid Ground" (Bridges)
- 1979: Mary Welch – "I Could Have Danced All Night" / "When It Was Good" (20th Century Fox)
- 1981: James Ward – "Child of Bethlehem" / "Child of Bethlehem" (Lamb & Lion)
- 1982: James Ward – "Faith Takes a Vision" / "Vessel" (Lamb & Lion)
- 1982: Mickey Clark – "Sweet Evangeline" / "You Take the Leavin' Out of Me" (Snake River)
- 1983: Mickey Clark – "The Cardinal Cannonball" (Note: Tribute to University of Louisville basketball. Rewrite of "Wabash Cannonball".) / "The Battle of New Orleans, 1982" (Snake River)
- 1983: Mickey Clark – "The Battle of New Orleans, 1982" (Note: Tribute to University of Louisville basketball. Rewrite of "The Battle of New Orleans".) / "Shanty Boat Bill" (Snake River)
- 1983: Mickey Clark – "She's Gone to L.A. Again" / "The Tequila Express" (Monument)
- 1986: The Score – "Go Go Boy" / "Oh My My" (Sleeping Giant)
- 1987: Mickey Clark – When I'm Over You" / "Sweet Evangeline" (Evergreen)
- 198?: Tom Dooley and the Cosmic Cowboys – "Paradise (Muhlenberg County)" / "Figure It Out" (Kentucky)

Discography notes
