= Why (Glamma Kid song) =

1999 song by Glamma Kid

Single by Glamma Kid

from the album Kidology
- Released: 15 November 1999
- Genre: Reggae fusion
- Label: WEA
- Songwriters: Bernard Edwards, Nile Rodgers
- Producers: Damien Mendis, Stuart Bradbury

Glamma Kid singles chronology
"Much Love" (1999)	"Why" (1999)	"Bills 2 Pay" (2000)

"Why" is a song by British dancehall musician Glamma Kid. It was released on 15 November 1999 as the fourth single from his debut album, Kidology (2000). A top 10 hit, the song peaked at No. 10 on the UK Singles Chart. The song features vocals from singers Marcelle Duprey and Rita Campbell, and heavily interpolates Carly Simon’s 1982 song "Why".

== Track listing ==
CD maxi-single

1. "Why" (Edit) - 3:32
2. "Why" (Stepchild Club Mix) - 3:10
3. "Why" (10° Below Vocal Mix) - 5:11
4. "Why" (Clarkey & Blakey Mix) - 4:01

12" single
A1. "Why" (Edit) - 3:32
A2. "Why" (10° Below Vocal Mix) - 5:11
B1. "Why" (Giant Steps 2-Step Mix) - 5:45
B2. "Why" (Mafia & Fluxy Hard Mix) - 3:43
B3. "Why" (Clarkey & Blakey Mix) - 4:01
