= Take It Back (Toddla T song) =

Single by Toddla T featuring Shola Ama and J2K

from the album Watch Me Dance
- Released: 30 March 2011
- Recorded: 2010
- Genre: UK garage
- Length: 3:19
- Label: Ninja Tune
- Songwriter(s): S. Ama, J. Black, Toddla T, B. Holland

Toddla T singles chronology
"Sky Surfing" (2010)	"Take It Back" (2011)

"Take It Back" is a song by English DJ and producer Toddla T, released on 30 March 2011 as the first single from his second studio album Watch Me Dance. The song features guest vocal contributions by Shola Ama and J2K. It reached No. 59 on the UK Singles Chart.

== Music video ==
A music video for the song was uploaded to YouTube on 24 May 2011.

== Track listing ==
Digital download - single
No.	Title	Length
1.	"Take It Back" (Radio Edit)	3:19

Digital download - remixes
No.	Title	Length
1.	"Take It Back" (Club Edit)	4:18
2.	"Take It Back" (The 2 Bears Remix)	7:36
3.	"Take It Back" (D1 Remix)	4:41
4.	"Take It Back" (Dillon Francis Remix)	4:48
5.	"Take It Back" (Des Demure Remix)	5:33
6.	"Take It Back" (DJ Q Remix)	5:06

== Chart performance ==
Chart (2011)	Peak position
UK Singles (OCC)	59

== Release history ==
Region	Date	Format	Label
United Kingdom	30 March 2011	Digital download - single	Ninja Tune
United Kingdom	23 May 2011	Digital download - remixes	Ninja Tune
