= Save Your Kisses =

2004 studio album by Natasha Thomas

Studio album by Natasha Thomas
- Released: 5 July 2004
- Length: 52:00
- Label: Epic
- Producer: Alex Christensen; WCA

Natasha Thomas chronology
Save Your Kisses (2004)	Playin' with Fire (2006)

Singles from Save Your Kisses
- 1. "Why (Does Your Love Hurt So Much)" Released: 21 July 2003; 2. "It's Over Now" Released: 2 February 2004; 3. "Save Your Kisses for Me" Released: 7 June 2004

Save Your Kisses is the debut studio album by Danish singer Natasha Thomas, released on 5 July 2004 by Epic Records. The album had impact in some European countries and South America, particularly in Brazil, where the song "It's Over Now" became popular following its inclusion on the soundtrack to the telenovela Her Own Destiny. In Japan, the album was released in 2005 with a different cover art and a slightly altered track listing; in it, "Save Your Kisses for Me" was replaced with "Let Me Show You (The Way)", which has the same arrangement, but with different lyrics, and the song "I'm Just a Little Bit Shy" was replaced with a single mix of "Save Your Kisses for Me".

== Track listing ==
Standard edition
No.	Title	Writer(s)	Producer(s)	Length
1.	"Introducing Natasha/Loving You Is Not Easy (Uh La La)"	"Introducing Natasha": Alex Christensen; Peter Könemann; "Loving You Is Not Easy (Uh La La)": lyrics by Sugar Daddy	Christensen	4:27
2.	"Save Your Kisses for Me"	Christensen; Steffen Häfelinger	Christensen	3:46
3.	"Young Hearts"	Peter Björklund; Johan Sahlén; Claes Andreasson	Christensen	3:00
4.	"Why (Does Your Love Hurt So Much)"	Nile Rodgers; Bernard Edwards	Christensen	4:01
5.	"More and More"	Christensen; Häfelinger	Christensen	3:39
6.	"Sunshine After Rain"	Christensen; Könemann	Christensen	3:50
7.	"It's Over Now"	Christensen; Häfelinger	Christensen	3:37
8.	"Suddenly"	Christensen; Könemann; Rune Gardell; Anders Bergström; Dan Attlerud	Christensen	3:45
9.	"I'm Just a Little Bit Shy"	Christensen; Häfelinger	Christensen	3:13
10.	"Hold Me Closer"	Christensen; Jens Klein	Christensen	2:59
11.	"Young and Carefree"	Janus Bosen Barnewitz; Thomas Sardorf	WCA	3:29
12.	"Can't Turn Back Time"	Sardorf; Barnewitz; Daniel Davidsen	WCA	3:41
13.	"Rollercoaster Ride"	Sardorf; Barnewitz; Davidsen	WCA	4:07
14.	"More Than Friends"	Sardorf; Barnewitz; Davidsen	WCA	4:26
Total length:				52:00

Japanese edition
No.	Title	Writer(s)	Producer(s)	Length
1.	"Introducing Natasha/Loving You Is Not Easy (Uh La La)"	"Introducing Natasha": Christensen; Könemann; "Loving You Is Not Easy (Uh La La)": lyrics by Sugar Daddy	Christensen	4:27
2.	"Let Me Show You (The Way)"	Christensen; Häfelinger	Christensen	3:45
3.	"Young Hearts"	Björklund; Sahlén; Andreasson	Christensen	3:00
4.	"Why (Does Your Love Hurt So Much)"	Rodgers; Edwards	Christensen	4:01
5.	"More and More"	Christensen; Häfelinger	Christensen	3:39
6.	"Sunshine After Rain"	Christensen; Könemann	Christensen	3:50
7.	"It's Over Now" (single mix)	Christensen; Häfelinger	Christensen	3:35
8.	"Suddenly"	Christensen; Könemann; Gardell; Bergström; Attlerud	Christensen	3:45
9.	"Save Your Kisses for Me" (single mix)	Christensen; Häfelinger	Christensen	3:45
10.	"Hold Me Closer"	Christensen; Klein	Christensen	2:59
11.	"Young and Carefree"	Barnewitz; Sardorf	WCA	3:29
12.	"Can't Turn Back Time"	Sardorf; Barnewitz; Davidsen	WCA	3:41
13.	"Rollercoaster Ride"	Sardorf; Barnewitz; Davidsen	WCA	4:07
14.	"More Than Friends"	Sardorf; Barnewitz; Davidsen	WCA	4:26
Total length:				52:31

== Personnel ==
=== Musicians ===
- Natasha Thomas – lead vocals (all tracks); background vocals (tracks 11–14)
- Alex Christensen – all instruments (tracks 1–10); keyboards (tracks 1–6, 8–10)
- Peter Könemann – all instruments, keyboards (tracks 1–6, 8–10)
- Steffen Häfelinger – all instruments (tracks 1–10); keyboards, guitars (tracks 1–6, 8–10)
- Jens Klein – all instruments, keyboards (tracks 1–6, 8–10)
- Jürgen Leydel – guitars (tracks 1–6, 8–10)
- Daniel Davidsen – guitar (tracks 12–14)
- Linda Holmberg – background vocals (tracks 11, 13, 14)
- Thomas Sardorf – background vocals (track 12)
- Susanne Palsbøll – background vocals (track 12)

=== Technical ===
- Alex Christensen – production, mixing (tracks 1–10); executive production
- Andrew Nightline – executive production
- Steffen Häfelinger – mixing (tracks 1–10); editing (track 7); vocal editing (tracks 3–6, 8–10)
- Le Koma – mixing (tracks 1–6, 8–10); vocal editing (tracks 3–6, 8–10)
- Mr. Minimal – mixing (tracks 1–6, 8–10); vocal editing (tracks 3–6, 8–10)
- WCA – production (tracks 11–14)
- Peter Mark – mixing (tracks 11–14)

=== Artwork ===
- Thomas Leidig – photography
- Joaquim Justo – photography
- Markus Nass – photography
- Marc Schilkowski – artwork

== Charts ==
Chart performance for Save Your Kisses
Chart (2004–2005)	Peak position
Austrian Albums (Ö3 Austria)	48
German Albums (Offizielle Top 100)	20
Japanese Albums (Oricon)	25
Swiss Albums (Schweizer Hitparade)	67

== Release history ==
Release history for Save Your Kisses
Region	Date	Label	Ref.
Germany	5 July 2004	Epic	
Japan	24 March 2005	Sony	
