= Glamma Kid =

- Born: Iyael Iyases Tafari Constable; 14 March 1978 (age 48); Hackney, London, England
- Genres: Dancehall, ragga, hip hop, house
- Occupations: Singer, songwriter, producer
- Instrument: Vocals
- Years active: 1995–present

Iyael Lyases Tafari Constable (born 14 March 1978), better known as Glamma Kid, is a British toaster and former Royal Air Force trainee of part-Jamaican descent. He had two top 10 hits in 1999.

== Music career ==
During the 1990s, Glamma Kid was featured on productions by UK producers Mafia & Fluxy. Glamma Kid performed live with Grace Jones on her hit single "My Jamaican Guy" on UK television for BBC Windrush. In 1997, Glamma Kid appeared on a BBC Radio 1 rap show with Tim Westwood. In 1998, he was awarded Best Reggae Act at the MOBO Awards.

He has had two UK top 10 hits, "Taboo" and "Why". He also teamed up with UK dance duo Basement Jaxx on the song "Fly Life". His song titled "Ladies Knight" was a collaboration with UK reggae singer Maxi Priest and interpolates Kool & the Gang's "Ladies Night".

Glamma Kid collaborated on a song with Beenie Man and Jamelia titled "Bling Bling Bling".

Estelle featured on Glamma Kid's "Computer Love".

== Discography ==
=== Albums ===
- Kidology (2000) - UK No. 66

=== Singles ===
| Year | Song | UK | FR | NL | NZ | Album |
|---|---|---|---|---|---|---|
| 1997 | "Moschino" | - | - | - | - | Kidology |
| 1997 | "Fly Life" (with Basement Jaxx) | 19 | - | - | - | EP3 (Basement Jaxx album) |
| 1997 | "It's Alright" | - | - | - | - | |
| 1998 | "Fashion '98" | 49 | - | - | - | Kidology |
| 1999 | "Taboo" (with Shola Ama) | 10 | 78 | 26 | 22 | Kidology |
| 1999 | "Much Love" (with Shola Ama) | 17 | - | - | - | Much Love (Shola Ama album) |
| 1999 | "Why" | 10 | - | - | - | Kidology |
| 2000 | "Bills 2 Pay" | 17 | - | - | - | Kidology |
| 2010 | "Walking on Air" (with Adele Harley) | - | - | - | - | |
| 2011 | "Informer" (with Lady Chann) | - | - | - | - | |
| 2011 | "System Sheg Up" (Stingray Records) | - | - | - | - | |
