= Skanky Skanky =

Studio album by Toddla T
- Released: 22 May 2009
- Genre: Dancehall, hip hop, grime
- Label: 1965 Records; Sony UK

Toddla T chronology
Skanky Skanky (2009)	FabricLive.47 (2009)

Skanky Skanky is the debut album by English electronic musician Toddla T. It features collaborations from artists including Matt Helders, Roots Manuva, Tinchy Stryder, and Benjamin Zephaniah. There are also more regular contributions from Serocee and Mr Versatile.

Professional ratings
Review scores
Source	Rating
Clash	8/10 stars
The Daily Telegraph	4/5 stars
The Guardian	3/5 stars
NME	7/10 stars
Rolling Stone	3.5/5 stars

== Critical reception ==
musicOMH wrote that the album "blends raw dancehall aggression with hip-hop sensibilities and an unshakeable sense of humour to create a sweaty, bombastic, and – above all – thoroughly enjoyable dancefloor-ready trip to the Steel City." Rolling Stone called it "a riotously funny barrage of electro hooks and dancehall riddims."

== Track list ==
No.	Title	Writer(s)	Featured Artists	Length
1.	"Boom DJ From the Steel City"	Tom Bell, Matt Helders	Trigganom & Helders	3:28
2.	"Goin' Off"	Tom Bell, Rodney Hylton Smith	Roots Manuva, Serocee & Shake Aletti	3:35
3.	"Rice and Peas"	Tom Bell, Jason Lee Bailey	Mr Versatile	3:43
4.	"Butter Me Up"	Tom Bell, Kwasi Danquah	Siobhan Gallagher & Tinchy Stryder	3:25
5.	"Manabadman"	Tom Bell	Serocee	3:04
6.	"Safe"	Tom Bell, Ross Orton, Kwasi Danquah, Jason Lee Bailey	Tinchy Stryder & Mr Versatile	3:42
7.	"Sound Tape Killin'"	Tom Bell	Serocee	3:08
8.	"Road Trip"	Tom Bell, Jason Lee Bailey	T Willy and Mr Versatile	3:23
9.	"Shake It"	Tom Bell, Joshua Harvey	Hervé & Serocee	2:59
10.	"Rebel"	Tom Bell, Benjamin Zephaniah, Joe Goddard	Benjamin Zephaniah & Joe Goddard	4:25
11.	"No Kip"	Tom Bell, Jason Lee Bailey	T Willy & Mr Versatile	3:25
12.	"Funny Money"	Tom Bell, Rodney Hylton Smith	Roots Manuva & Siobhan Gallagher	4:37
13.	"Where Mi Key Deh?"	Tom Bell, Jason Lee Bailey	Mr Versatile	3:49
14.	"Better"	Tom Bell, Matt Helders, Jason Lee Bailey, Laura Marar	Jason Lee Bailey & Helders	5:27
