= Toddla T =

English DJ, record producer, remixer and songwriter

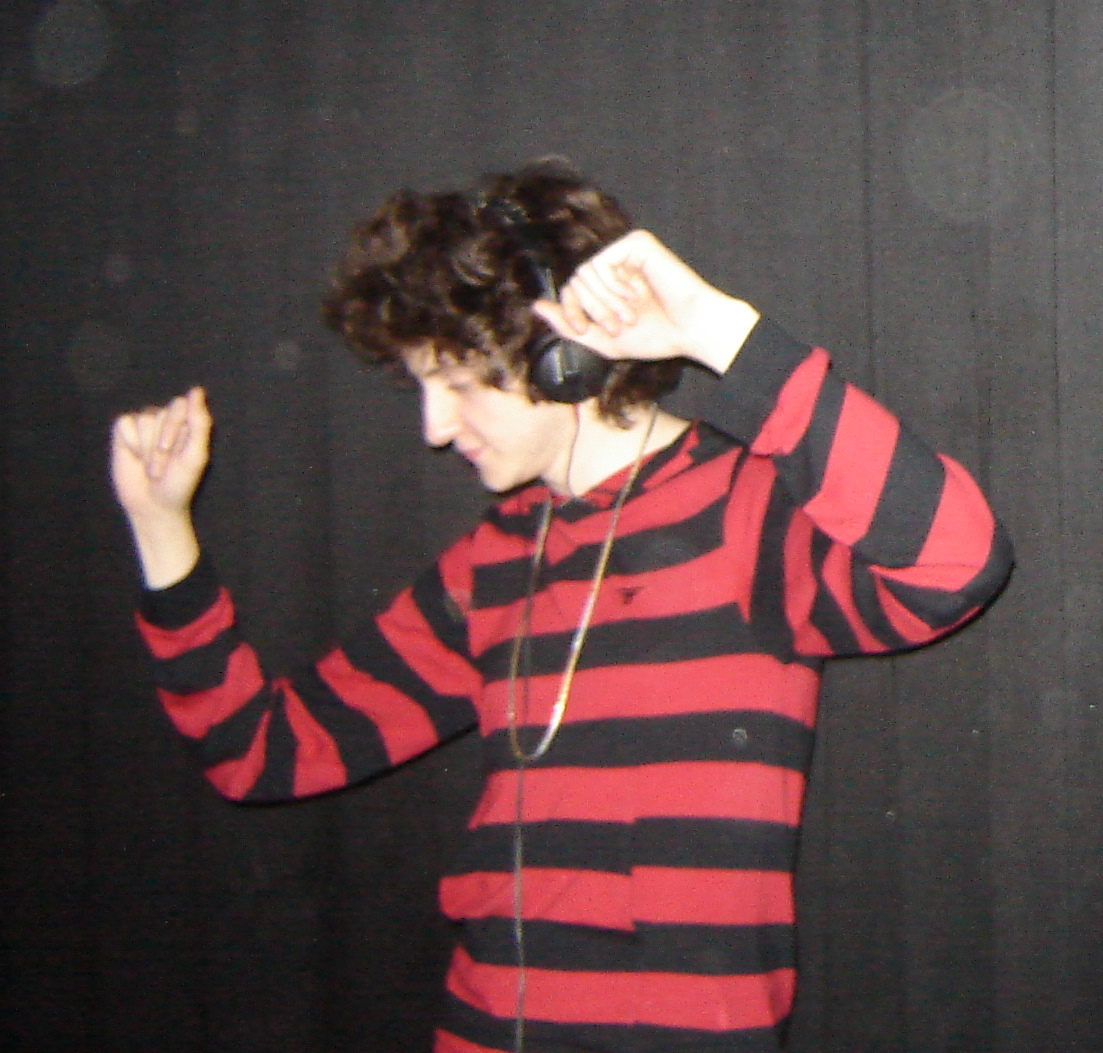
- Toddla T in 2009

Background information
- Born: Thomas Mackenzie Bell; 22 February 1985 (age 41)
- Origin: Sheffield, South Yorkshire, England
- Genres: Hip hop; UK garage; dancehall; breakbeat; house; grime
- Occupations: DJ; record producer; remixer; songwriter
- Instruments: Keyboards; turntables; programming
- Years active: 2003–present
- Labels: Ninja Tune; 1965
- Spouse: Annie Mac (m. 2018)
- Website: toddlat.com

Thomas Mackenzie Bell (born 22 February 1985), better known by the stage name of Toddla T, is an English DJ, record producer, remixer and songwriter from Sheffield, South Yorkshire.

== Biography ==
Bell was raised in Sheffield where he attended King Edward VII School. He started DJing at the age of 14 in the clubs and bars of Sheffield and by the age of 16 had left school to pursue a full-time career in the music industry. His stage name was given to him by the older Sheffield DJs who influenced him and was used to indicate his relative youth. He has two children with his wife, fellow former BBC Radio 1 DJ Annie Mac. Bell is a fan of Sheffield United F.C.

== Career ==
Bell's first album, for 1965 Records, encompasses hip-hop, electro, garage, dancehall and house and was released in May 2009. The major collaborators were Serocee and Mr Versatile. The album also features further collaborations with Matt Helders from the Arctic Monkeys, Benjamin Zephaniah, Roots Manuva, Tinchy Stryder, Joe Goddard, Conna "Three Chainz" Haines and Hervé. He has created a mix album for the London nightclub Fabric.

Bell DJs in clubs and festivals throughout the UK, Europe, North America and Australia. He has a quarterly residency at XOYO and a soundsystem at Notting Hill Carnival. He formerly had a weekly show on BBC Radio 1 BBC Radio 1Xtra and BBC Asian Network and is involved in recording and producing various artists including Roots Manuva, Skepta, Wiley, Ms. Dynamite & Róisín Murphy. He has remixed Little Dragon, Major Lazer and Hot Chip. In 2010 he signed to the record label Ninja Tune and released Watch Me Dance in 2011. In 2012, Bell started his record label Girls Music with Raf Rundell from The 2 Bears. Toddla is also a producer in his own right, having produced singles such as Young T & Bugsey's "Strike A Pose" and Headie One, AJ Tracey, Stormzy's "Ain't It Different" and Kneecap's debut album Fine Art.

In August 2020, Toddla announced that he would be leaving the BBC after 11 years at the end of September.

== Discography ==
=== Studio albums ===
Title	Details
Skanky Skanky	Released: 22 May 2009; Label: 1965 Records
Watch Me Dance	Released: 22 August 2011; Label: Ninja Tune
Foreign Lights	Released: 28 August 2017; Label: Steeze
Out:Side	Released: 22 July 2022; Label: Delicious Vinyl, Runkus

=== Compilation albums ===
- FabricLive.47 (2009)

=== EPs ===
- Do U Know, 1965 Records (2007)
- On Acid, Defected (2014)
- Kensal Road EP, Girls Music (2015)

=== Singles ===
- "Fill Up Mi Portion", Do U Know (2007)
- "Backchatter (Mica's Version)", Do U Know (2007)
- "Inna Di Dancehall", Do U Know (2007)
- "Girls", Do U Know (2007)
- "Do U Know", Do U Know (2007)
- "Inna Di Dancehall", Do U Know (2007)
- "Manabadman" feat. Serocee & Trigganom (2008)
- "65 Dubplate" feat. Serocee & Trigganom (2008)
- "Soundtape Killin", (2008)
- "Shake It" with Hervé feat. Serocee (2009)
- "Sky Surfing (Dope Man)" (2010)
- "Streets So Warm" feat. Wayne Marshall (2011)
- "Take It Back" feat. Shola Ama & J2K, Ninja Tune (2011)
- "Watch Me Dance" with Roots Manuva (2011)
- "Cherry Picking" feat. Róisín Murphy (2011)
- "My God" - Trojan Sound System vs Toddla T (2011)
- "Alive" with Shola Ama (2012)
- "I Don't Wanna Hear That" with Danny Weed & Jammer (2015)
- "Walkin" - Toddla T meets The Suns of Dub (2015)
- "Big Tune a Drop" - Toddla T vs The 2 Bears (2015)
- "It's All Love" feat. Craig David (2022)
- "We Run the Area" with Idris Elba, General Levy & Naomi Cowan (2023)
- "Vogue" with Cristale (2025)

=== Production credits ===
Title	Year	Artist(s)	Album	Produced with
"Boasty"	2019	Wiley, Stefflon Don, Sean Paul, Idris Elba	Non-album single	Mucky
"Strike a Pose"	2019	Young T & Bugsey, Aitch	Plead the 5th	None
"Pop Boy"	2019	Stormzy, Aitch	Heavy Is the Head	Fred Again
"Ain't It Different"	2020	Headie One, AJ Tracey, Stormzy	Edna	Fred Again
"Better Way to Live"	2023	Kneecap, Grian Chatten	Fine Art	None
"Sick in the Head"	2024	Kneecap	Fine Art	None
"Fine Art"	2024	Kneecap	Fine Art	None
"Love Making"	2024	Kneecap, Nino	Fine Art	None
"Keep Holding On"	2024	Becky Hill	Believe Me Now?	None
"3CAG"	2024	Kneecap, Radie Peat	Fine Art	None
"Interlude: Making Headlines"	2024	Kneecap	Fine Art	None
"I bhFiacha Linne"	2024	Kneecap	Fine Art	None
"Interlude: Never Gets a Round"	2024	Kneecap	Fine Art	None
"I'm Flush"	2024	Kneecap	Fine Art	None
"Interlude: State of Ya"	2024	Kneecap	Fine Art	None
"Interlude: Amhrán na Scadán"	2024	Kneecap	Fine Art	None
"Drug Dealin Pagans"	2024	Kneecap	Fine Art	None
"Interlude: Kneecap Chaps"	2024	Kneecap	Fine Art	None
"Harrow Road"	2024	Kneecap, Jelani Blackman	Fine Art	None
"Parful"	2024	Kneecap	Fine Art	None
"Rhino Ket"	2024	Kneecap	Fine Art	None
"Interlude: Last Orders"	2024	Kneecap	Fine Art	None
"Way Too Much"	2024	Kneecap	Fine Art	None
"Tipsy"	2024	Headie One, Aitch	The Last One	None
"GTKY"	2024	Valiant	Non-album single	Izzy Bossy
