= You Might Need Somebody =

1980 song by Turley Richards

"You Might Need Somebody" is a song written by Tom Snow and Nan O'Byrne, first recorded in 1979 by American singer and guitarist Turley Richards. In 1981, American jazz and R&B singer and songwriter Randy Crawford released her version which reached No. 11 in the United Kingdom and was a modest hit in Belgium and New Zealand. In 1997, English singer Shola Ama's version reached the top 10 in the UK and in several other countries, including Ireland, France, the Netherlands, and New Zealand.

== Early versions ==
The first version of the song was released in 1979 by American singer and guitarist Turley Richards from his album Therfu. The single peaked at No. 54 on the US Billboard Hot 100 in early 1980. In the same year, Anna Oxa released an Italian version titled "Metropolitana" with Italian lyrics written by Marco Luberti for her studio album Controllo totale.

== Randy Crawford version ==
"You Might Need Somebody"
- Dutch release

Single by Randy Crawford

from the album Secret Combination
- B-side: "You Bring the Sun Out"
- Released: 1981
- Genre: R&B
- Length: 4:17
- Label: Warner Bros.
- Songwriters: Nan O'Byrne; Tom Snow
- Producer: Tommy LiPuma

Randy Crawford singles chronology
"When I Lose My Way" (1981)	"You Might Need Somebody" (1981)	"Rainy Night in Georgia" (1981)

Official audio
- "You Might Need Somebody" on YouTube

In 1981, American singer-songwriter Randy Crawford covered the song for her fifth album, Secret Combination (1981). It was the second single released from the album by Warner Bros. Records Her version reached No. 11 on the UK Singles Chart, making it her fourth-highest-charting single on that chart. It also peaked at No. 39 on the Belgian (Flanders) Ultratop 50 singles chart in October 1981 and on the New Zealand singles chart in January 1982.

The guitar solo is by Steve Lukather.

=== Charts ===
Chart (1981–1982)	Peak position
Belgium (Ultratop 50 Flanders)	39
Ireland (IRMA)	15
New Zealand (Recorded Music NZ)	39
UK Singles (Official Charts)	11

== Shola Ama version ==
"You Might Need Somebody"

Single by Shola Ama

from the album Much Love
- Released: April 7, 1997
- Genre: Pop; R&B
- Length: 4:51 (album version); 3:51 (radio mix)
- Label: WEA
- Songwriters: Nan O'Byrne; Tom Snow
- Producer: D'Influence

Shola Ama singles chronology
"You're the One I Love" (1996)	"You Might Need Somebody" (1997)	"You're the One I Love" (re-issue) (1997)

Music video
- "You Might Need Somebody" on YouTube

In 1997, English singer Shola Ama recorded a version of the song featured on her debut album, Much Love (1997). Her version was produced by D'Influence and released in April 1997 by WEA Records. The song reached No. 4 on the UK Singles Chart and became a top-10 hit in France, Ireland, Israel, the Netherlands, and New Zealand. On the Eurochart Hot 100, it peaked at No. 25 in October 1997. The accompanying music video, directed by Jake Nava, was put at heavy rotation on MTV.

=== Critical reception ===
Billboard described the song as a "curious little number" and a "jazzy, Brand New Heavies-ish type of track that reeks of a classic soul production akin to a Ray Parker Jr. orchestration". They added that "while that sounds confusing, once programmers and listeners key into the lyrics, which are well written and well executed, Shola Ama's influences are of no consequence". Swedish Göteborgs-Tidningen named it a "truly delightful, generous electric piano-garnished Randy Crawford-cover". A reviewer from Music & Media said that "there's little doubt that that Shola Ama has a fantastic voice", adding that "radio has already warmed to this familiar cover, which is reproduced almost note for note from the Randy Crawford original".

British magazine Music Week gave it four out of five, noting that the singer "breathes new life" into the 16-year-old hit, "with a classy, understated performance." Music Week editor, Alan Jones, said it is "still sounding superb", stating that "the backing is looser and less urgent, as the song ploughs an R&B furrow." Ralph Tee from the Record Mirror gave it three out of five, stating that it is "given a crisp clean street soul production by D-Influence". He concluded that "its definitely their mix that cuts it the best, despite it sounding so close to the original. It just sounds great." Dave Fawbert from ShortList deemed the song as "absolutely massive". A reviewer from the Sunday Mirror stated that Ama's "got such an amazing voice. She's the best British female R&B singer," and added, "I really liked 'You Might Need Somebody'".

=== Live performances ===
Ama performed "You Might Need Somebody" in three successive Top of the Pops performances. She said in a 1997 interview, "After the first couple of shows, people wouldn't believe that I had sung live; they all thought I'd been miming. So on the third one, I missed a bit out to prove it was for real."

=== Track listings ===
CD single (CD1), UK and Europe (1997)
No.	Title	Length
1.	"You Might Need Somebody" (DI Classic radio mix)	3:51
2.	"You Might Need Somebody" (DI Classic radio mix with rap)	3:52
3.	"You Might Need Somebody" (C&J Lovers mix)	4:02
4.	"You Might Need Somebody" (Mousse T's Mellow Dub mix)	5:48
5.	"You Might Need Somebody" (Ill-In-Ton's club mix)	6:20

CD single (CD2), UK and Europe (1997)
No.	Title	Length
1.	"You Might Need Somebody" (Paul Waller Dirty Bass mix with rap)	5:41
2.	"You Might Need Somebody" (Mousse T's Soul Train with rap)	4:04
3.	"You Might Need Somebody" (Brockpocket mix)	4:32
4.	"You Might Need Somebody" (Basement Jaxx Night dub)	5:56

=== Charts ===
==== Weekly charts ====
Chart (1997)	Peak position
Austria (Ö3 Austria Top 40)	32
Belgium (Ultratip Bubbling Under Flanders)	7
Belgium (Ultratop 50 Wallonia)	28
Europe (Eurochart Hot 100)	25
France (SNEP)	10
Germany (GfK)	21
Iceland (Íslenski Listinn Topp 40)	20
Ireland (IRMA)	9
Israel (Israeli Singles Chart)	7
Netherlands (Dutch Top 40)	8
Netherlands (Single Top 100)	8
New Zealand (Recorded Music NZ)	8
Scottish Singles Sales (Official Charts)	11
Sweden (Sverigetopplistan)	22
Switzerland (Schweizer Hitparade)	17
UK Singles (Official Charts)	4
UK Hip Hop/R&B (Official Charts)	2

==== Year-end charts ====
Chart (1997)	Position
Europe (Eurochart Hot 100)	60
France (SNEP)	48
Germany (Media Control)	83
Netherlands (Dutch Top 40)	38
Netherlands (Single Top 100)	34
UK Singles (OCC)	36

=== Certifications ===
Region	Certification	Certified units/sales
France (SNEP)	Gold	250,000^{*}
New Zealand (RMNZ)	Gold	5,000^{*}
United Kingdom (BPI)	Silver	200,000^{^}
^{*} Sales figures based on certification alone.^{^} Shipments figures based on certification alone.
