= You're the One I Love =

1996 single by Shola Ama

Single by Shola Ama

from the album Much Love
- Released: 11 November 1996
- Genre: Soul
- Length: 3:53
- Label: WEA; Freakstreet
- Songwriters: Shaun LaBelle; Stevie Bensusen
- Producer: Shaun LaBelle

Shola Ama singles chronology
"Celebrate" (1995)	"You're the One I Love" (1996)	"You Might Need Somebody" (1997)
"You Might Need Somebody" (1997)	"You're the One I Love" (1997)	"Who's Loving My Baby" (1998)

Music video
- "You're the One I Love" on YouTube

"You're the One I Love" is a song by English singer Shola Ama, released by WEA Records and Freakstreet as the first single from her debut album, Much Love (1997), in November 1996. The song is written by Shaun LaBelle with Stevie Bensusen and produced by LaBelle. On the first single release, it reached number 81 on the UK Singles Chart, but after her successful cover version of "You Might Need Somebody" in 1997, it was re-released in August of that year and peaked at number three, becoming her highest-charting hit in the UK. Elsewhere, the single charted in Estonia, France, the Netherlands, New Zealand and Romania. The accompanying music video was directed by Randee St. Nicholas.

== Critical reception ==
British magazine Music Week gave the song a score of four out of five, adding, "Seventeen-year-old Ama shows maturity beyond her years with a classy, soulful performance on this debut single." Paul Elliott wrote, "'You're the One I Love' is a precocious big-league debut. Written and produced by Shaun Labelle, one of America's fastest-rising new producer's, the track is smooth and streetwise and Ama's performance is super-confident." A reviewer from Sunday Mirror said after the re-release of the single, following "You Might Need Somebody", "She could have been a one-hit wonder but on this showing young Shola has got legs. Good to see a Brit teaching the Yanks a thing or two about funky soul." Bobbito Garcia for Vibe concluded, "It's a slammin' song. I couldn't understand why it didn't do well in the States."

== Music video ==
The music video for "You're the One I Love" was directed by Randee St. Nicholas. It takes place in a restaurant. In the beginning, Ama arrives at the place, meeting her friends. Occasionally she is also seen singing as she peeks out through one of the windows. She notices a man in the street. He also enters the restaurant and sits down with his friends. These two start looking at each other. Halfway through the video, the man leaves for unknown reason. Apparently sad by this, Ama lights up again when he suddenly reappears on the other side of the window, looking at her. As the video draws to a close, the singer is left alone after her friends leave. The man who until now has been sitting at the other end of the room walks towards her and sits down with her. As the video ends, they sit and talk in the restaurant.

== Track listings ==
- 12-inch, Germany (1997)
1. "You're the One I Love" (C&J Album Version) — 4:07
2. "You're the One I Love" (Brooklyn Funk Acapella) — 4:05
3. "You're the One I Love" (London Dub) — 5:16
4. "You're the One I Love" (Dark Dub) — 5:54
- CD single, UK and Europe (1996)
1. "You're the One I Love" (C & J Radio Edit) — 3:53
2. "You're the One I Love" (DI Paradise Edit) — 3:54
3. "You're the One I Love" (Album Version) — 3:55
4. "You're the One I Love" (Dodge's Mix) — 4:15
5. "You're the One I Love" (C & J Street Mix) — 4:15
6. "You're the One I Love" (DI Paradise Mix) — 5:35
7. "You're the One I Love" (Freshly Squeezed Mix) — 7:06
8. "You're the One I Love" (Lukas' Do Anything Mix) — 5:36
- CD single, Germany (1997)
1. "You're the One I Love" (C&J Original Edit) — 3:53
2. "You Might Need Somebody" (Acoustic Version) — 3:23
- CD single CD1, UK (1997)
1. "You're the One I Love" (C&J Original Edit) — 3:53
2. "You're the One I Love" (D + A '97 Feelin It Mix) — 3:58
3. "You're the One I Love" (Brooklyn Funk R&B Mix) — 4:09
4. "You're the One I Love" (D-I Paradise '97 Mix (12")) — 5:31
5. "You're the One I Love" (C&J Mix) — 4:07
- CD single CD2, UK (1997)
1. "You're the One I Love" (C&J Original Edit) — 3:53
2. "You're the One I Love" (Brooklyn Funk Alt Mix) — 4:15
3. "You're the One I Love" (Brooklyn Funk Club Mix) — 4:08
4. "You Might Need Somebody" (Acoustic Version) — 3:23

== Charts ==
=== Weekly charts ===
Charts (1996)	Peak position
UK Singles (OCC)	81
UK R&B (OCC)	10
UK Dance (OCC)	28

Charts (1997–1998)	Peak position
Estonia (Eesti Top 20)	2
Europe (Eurochart Hot 100)	31
France (SNEP)	81
France Airplay (SNEP)	8
Israel (Israeli Singles Chart)	30
Italy Airplay (Music & Media)	9
Netherlands (Dutch Top 40 Tipparade)	14
Netherlands (Single Top 100)	93
New Zealand (Recorded Music NZ)	45
Scotland (OCC)	10
UK Singles (OCC)	3
UK R&B (OCC)	2

=== Year-end charts ===
Charts (1997)	Position
Romania (Romanian Top 100)	97
UK Singles (OCC)	95

== Release history ==
Region	Date	Format(s)	Label(s)	Ref.
United Kingdom	1996	12-inch vinyl; CD	WEA; Freakstreet	
United Kingdom (re-release)	18 August 1997	CD; cassette	WEA; Freakstreet	
