= Much Love =

1997 studio album by Shola Ama

Studio album by Shola Ama
- Released: 1 September 1997
- Recorded: 1995–1997
- Genre: R&B
- Length: 51:56
- Labels: Freakstreet; WEA
- Producers: Shaun LaBelle; D'Influence; Livio Harris; Paul Waller

Shola Ama chronology
Much Love (1997)	In Return (1999)

Professional ratings
Review scores
Source	Rating
AllMusic	4/5 stars
Music Week	5/5 stars
The Times	(favorable)

Much Love is the debut album by British singer Shola Ama. It was released by Freakstreet and WEA on 1 September 1997 in the United Kingdom. Ama worked with songwriting collective D'Influence on the majority of the album, with Shaun LaBelle, Livio Harris, and Paul Waller providing additional production. Much Love was preceded by two top ten hit singles: a cover of "You Might Need Somebody", originally made famous by Randy Crawford, and follow-up "You're the One I Love". "Who's Loving My Baby" and "Much Love" were also released as singles, both reaching the UK top twenty.

The album reached the top ten of the UK Albums Chart, peaking at number six, and entered the top twenty in Germany and the top thirty in France, and the Netherlands. In the United Kingdom, it was eventually certified gold by the British Phonographic Industry (BPI), indicating sales in excess of 100,000 copies. Following the success of the album, Ama won a Brit Award for Best British Female and two MOBO Awards for Best Newcomer and Best R&B Act.

== Track listing ==
No.	Title	Writer(s)	Producer(s)	Length
1.	"You're the One I Love"	Stevie Bensusen; Shaun LaBelle	LaBelle	4:12
2.	"Much Love"	Bensusen; LaBelle	LaBelle	3:56
3.	"You Might Need Somebody"	Tom Snow; Nan O'Byrne	D'Influence	4:50
4.	"Who's Loving My Baby"	Livio Harris; Melvin Britt II; Jorge Corante	Harris	4:38
5.	"Celebrate"	Shola Ama; Ed Baden-Powell; Kwame Kwaten; Steve Marston; Sarah Ann Webb	D'Influence	4:30
6.	"I Love Your Ways"	Ama; Baden-Powell; Kwaten; Marston; Webb	D'Influence	4:19
7.	"We Got a Vibe"	Bensusen; LaBelle	LaBelle	4:04
8.	"Summer Love"	Ama; Baden-Powell; Kwaten; Marston; Webb	D'Influence	4:44
9.	"(I Don't Know) Interlude"	Ama; Baden-Powell; Kwaten; Marston; Webb	D'Influence	1:47
10.	"I Can Show You"	Ama; Paul Waller; Toby Baker	Waller	4:26
11.	"All Mine"	Ama; Baden-Powell; Kwaten; Marston; Webb	D'Influence	4:46
12.	"One Love"	Ama; Baden-Powell; Kwaten; Marston; Webb	D'Influence	5:27

Sample credits

- "I Love Your Ways" contains a replayed element of "Give Me the Sunshine" by Leo's Sunshipp.

== Personnel ==
Adapted from AllMusic.

- San Acharya – A&R
- Shola Ama – primary artist, vocals, background vocals
- Ed Baden-Powell – bass, drum programming, guitar, acoustic guitar, bass, keyboards, string arrangements
- Toby Baker – bass, keyboards
- David Barry – guitar
- Carlton Batts – mastering
- Joe Belmaati – keyboards, programming
- Melvin Britt – background vocals
- Sue Ann Carwell – vocal arrangement, background vocals
- Rob Chiarelli – mixing
- Jorge Corante – drum programming, keyboards, piano
- Cutfather – producer, remixing
- D'Influence – arranger, mixing, producer
- Michael "Mickey D" Davis – A&R, executive producer
- Terry Dexter – background vocals
- Marcella Ffrench – background vocals
- Mark Franks – engineer
- Guido Zen – engineer
- Livio Harris – arranger, producer, background vocals
- Stephen Hussey – strings
- Anthony Jeffries – engineer
- Kwame Kwaten – bass, executive producer, keyboards, moog bass
- Shaun LaBelle – arranger, bass, drum programming, producer, synthesizer
- Ed Lover – engineer
- Steve Marston – horn
- Patrick McMahon – engineer
- Yan Memmi – engineer, mixing
- Rod Michaels – engineer
- Randee Saint Nicholas – photography
- Dik Shopteau – engineer
- Paul Waller – arranger, drum programming, keyboards, mixing, producer

== Charts ==
=== Weekly charts ===
Weekly chart performance for Much Love
Chart (1997)	Peak position
Dutch Albums (Album Top 100)	24
European Albums (Top 100)	16
French Albums (SNEP)	21
German Albums (Offizielle Top 100)	19
Italian Albums (FIMI)	13
Scottish Albums (Official Charts)	35
Swiss Albums (Schweizer Hitparade)	35
UK Albums (Official Charts)	6
UK R&B Albums (Official Charts)	1

=== Year-end charts ===
Year-end chart performance for Much Love
Chart (1997)	Position
Italian Albums (Musica e dischi)	99
UK Albums (OCC)	88

== Certifications ==
Region	Certification	Certified units/sales
France (SNEP)	Gold	100,000^{*}
Italy (FIMI)	Platinum	100,000^{*}
United Kingdom (BPI)	Gold	100,000^{^}
^{*} Sales figures based on certification alone.^{^} Shipments figures based on certification alone.
