= Why (Carly Simon song) =

Single by Carly Simon

from the album Soup for One (soundtrack)
- Released: August 1982
- Recorded: 1981
- Genre: Pop; post-disco; disco-funk; tropical
- Length: 3:32
- Label: Mirage; WEA
- Songwriters: Nile Rodgers; Bernard Edwards
- Producer: Chic

Carly Simon singles chronology
"Jesse" (1980)	"Why" (1982)	"You Know What to Do" (1983)

"Why" is a song written by Nile Rodgers and Bernard Edwards and performed by American singer-songwriter Carly Simon. It was recorded for the film Soup for One in 1982. One of many film-inspired singles by Simon, the song became a top 10 hit in the UK, and was successful throughout Europe.

== Background ==
The song, like the rest of the soundtrack, was produced by Bernard Edwards and Nile Rodgers of Chic. This was a move away from the usual guitar-based hits of Simon's past. The bittersweet reggae-tinged ballad became a hit in Europe, hitting No. 10 in the UK, and staying on the British charts for 18 weeks. The song peaked at No. 74 on the Billboard Hot 100, and remained on the chart for 6 weeks.

The song has been included on several of Simon's compilation albums, including the three-disc Clouds in My Coffee (1995), the single-disc The Very Best of Carly Simon: Nobody Does It Better (1999), the two-disc Anthology (2002), and the import version of Reflections: Carly Simon's Greatest Hits (2004).

== Music video ==
Simon released a music video for the song, which was filmed on the streets of New York City in 1982. Simon's daughter, Sally Taylor, also appears in the video, seen pouring a bottle of wine over a man's head.

== Reception ==
Cash Box said that "Simon's vocal and Chic's polyrhythm street groove proves just the right formula."

In 2015, Pitchfork ranked "Why" at No. 188 on their list of the 200 Best Songs of the 1980s.

== Later significance ==
Wham! notably covered the song during their last concert The Final in 1986. In 1989, "Why" re-surfaced on the Ibiza "Hacienda" scene, and cemented its status as a Balearic classic. Known for its bass-line and funky drums, it was then that the growing hip-hop scene in the US began to pick it up seven years after its original release. The song re-entered the UK charts the same year, reaching No. 56. In 1990, A Tribe Called Quest would heavily sample the song for a remix of their hit single, "Bonita Applebum". In 1999, British dancehall musician Glamma Kid heavily interpolated the song in "Why", which was also a top 10 UK hit.

== Track listings and formats ==
7" single

- "Why" – 3:33
- "Why" (performed by Chic) – 3:33

12" single

- "Why" (extended version) – 8:11
- "Why" (instrumental) – 7:06

== Charts ==
Chart (1982)	Peak position
Belgium (Ultratop 50 Flanders)	21
Ireland (IRMA)	15
Luxembourg (Radio Luxembourg)	12
Netherlands (Single Top 100)	35
UK Singles (Official Charts)	10
US Billboard Hot 100	74
