= Serocee =

British hip hop and dancehall musician

Serocee is a UK based hip hop and dancehall artist and entrepreneur who was born in Birmingham, raised in Jamaica and developed in London.

He has to fused his 'Brumaican' accent with his cultural origins to create an identity in the UK music scene. Serocee's navigation within Hip Hop, Dancehall, Soca and UK Bass movements has positioned him within the worldwide festival and club circuits, giving him a career for almost 20 years.

Serocee has performed the UK, Jamaica, Trinidad, Japan, Australia, India, America, and Canada. He has performed with Busta Rhymes, De La Soul, Basement Jaxxx Toddla T, MJ Cole, Tony Mattherhon, Mr Vegas, Ghetts, Bunji Garlin, DJ Puffy, The Roots, Pharoahe Monch.

Serocee founded Rum 'N' Bass (2010) to spread the culture. He recognises the nuances of each country's unique representation of carnival. He curates and hosts Rum ‘N’ Bass’ annual flagship, pre-carnival boat party, Carnival on the Thames.

== Discography ==
=== Singles ===
- Life/War, Illflava (2006)
- Mr Government
- Work Featuring Brian Gold Jambrum (2008)
- You'll Never Find, Jambrum (2008)
- Badeng, Jambrum (2010)
- Oh Na Na, Jambrum (2011)
- Troublemaker, Jambrum (2012)

=== Collaborations ===
- Sero & Seanie (Seanie T) Muzic Ed Productions (2006)
- Godbless (Moorish Delta 7) Seven (2006)
- Murderer (Small Arms Fiya) 1965 Records (2007)
- Inna Di Dancehall (Toddla T) 1965 Records (2007)
- Give it to mi (Small Arms Fiya)
- Jump Up Jump Down / Come Rest Up (Det Boi), Skint Records (2008)
- Manabadman (Toddla T) 1965 Records (2008)
- Badman, Machines Don't Care (2008)
- Soundtape Killin (Toddla T) 1965 Records (2008)
- AO (MJ Cole) Prolific Records (2009)
- Wheel 'N' Stop (Basement Jaxx) XL (2009)
- An Ting (Wio-k & Ty) White (2009)
- I've Tried Ways (Sola Rosa) Way Up Records (2009)
- Shake It (Toddla T) 1965 Records (2009)
- Be With You (Lobster Boy) Run Music (2009)
- Fiyah with Profisee, EDO G and Mr Bang On (Capitol 1212)1212 Records 2010
- So It Go (South Rakkas Crew) Mad Decent (2010)
- Champion Sound (South Rakkas Crew) Mad Decent (2010)
- Rise (South Rakkas Crew) Mad Decent (2010)
- Dance Wid We (South Rakkas Crew) Mad Decent (2010)
- Badman Flu (Toddla T) Ninjatune (2011)

=== Compilations appeared on ===
- Top Class of 2006 (Suspect Packages)
- The Heard 2007 (Stronghorn Records)
- Fabric Mix Live 47 2009 (Fabric, London)
- Fact Mix 67 2009 (Fact Music)

== Music videos ==
- "You'll Never Find"
- "Life"
- "Whose Rhyme Is It Anyway"
- "The Heard "Bigger Than Us""
