= D'Influence =

British record producers

D'Influence (also D-Influence and D*Influence) is a British production team and acid jazz band. Formerly of The Echo Label, they founded their own label, Freakstreet Records. Original members include Kwame Kwaten, Sarah-Ann Webb, Ed Baden-Powell, Ned Bigham and Steve Marston.

== Biography ==
D'Influence emerged in 1990 from the UK club scene. The group eventually issued, in August 1992, their debut album entitled Good 4 We on East West Records. That album reached No. 7 on the Blues & Soul Top British Soul Albums chart. The song "Good Lover" from the LP also got to No. 11 on the Blues & Soul Top British Soul Singles chart.

D'Influence later released their 1995 sophomore studio album, Prayer 4 Unity on EastWest Records. The album reached No. 17 on the UK R&B Albums Chart. A single from the album, entitled "Midnite", reached No. 11 on the UK R&B Singles Chart and No. 24 on the UK Dance Singles Chart. Another single, "Waiting", peaked at No. 26 on the UK R&B Singles Chart.

The group's third studio album, titled London was released in 1997 by Echo Records. This album reached No. 8 on the UK R&B Albums Chart and No. 6 on the UK Independent Albums Chart. A song from the album called "Hypnotize" reached No. 33 on the UK Singles Chart, No. 3 on the UK Dance Singles Chart and No. 8 on the UK R&B Singles Chart. Another single entitled Magic reached No. 19 on the UK Dance Singles Chart, No. 13 on the UK R&B Singles Chart and No. 19 on the UK Independent Singles Chart.

During 1998 a non album cover of Michael Jackson's "Rock with you", was released by Echo Records. This song peaked at No. 30 on the UK Singles Chart, No. 4 on the UK Independent Singles Chart and No. 6 on the UK R&B Singles Chart.

In 2017, the band regrouped for one-off concerts at various top London clubs and summer festivals in the UK. Reviewing their 'generation-spanning' set at Love Supreme festival, Mike Hobart of the Financial Times praised "the slinky, bass-heavy grooves that sustained their success in the 1990s." He also proclaimed that D'Influence "last played a festival 17 years ago, their current revival coming about after a promoter saw... their annual get-together jam on Instagram. The band has lost none of its sass." 2018 saw further performances in the UK, Africa and Europe.

=== Other work ===
As a group, D'Influence have produced and remixed hit singles for British pop and R&B artists such as Mark Morrison ("Return of the Mack"), Shola Ama ("You Might Need Somebody", "Much Love"), Lighthouse Family ("Raincloud") and for Ultra Naté ("New Kind of Medicine"). They have also remixed songs for Mick Jagger, Tom Jones, American rapper Jay-Z ("Wishing on a Star", Bring It On: The Best of Jay-Z), and performed live with Icelandic singer-songwriter Björk (Later with Jools Holland).

== Discography ==
Albums
Title	Year	Peak chart positions			
Title	Year	UK	UK Indie	UK R&B	UK B&S
Good 4 We	1992	—	—	—	7
Prayer 4 Unity	1995	98	—	17	—
London	1997	56	6	8	—
