= Kwame Kwaten =

British musician, manager, consultant (born 1967)

Background information
- Born: Kwame Amankwa Kwaten; 13 May 1967 (age 59)
- Origin: London, England, United Kingdom
- Genres: Soul, acid jazz
- Occupations: Music manager; record executive; A&R; music consultant; musician
- Instrument: Keyboards
- Years active: 1984–present
- Labels: Ferocious Talent; Cr8ing Vision; Acid Jazz; East West America; Dome
- Website: Ferocious Talent

Kwame Amankwa Kwaten (born 13 May 1967) is a British manager, music consultant, musician and record producer. He owns an artist management and consultancy company called Ferocious Talent and is a co-founder of Cre8ing Vision, a non-profit company that offers young people a range of educational programmes, seminars, workshops and opportunities in both the music and sport industries. Past and present artists managed by Kwaten include Laura Mvula, The Night VI, Steve Brown, Shannon Saunders and Kerry Leatham.

In 1989, Kwaten was part of a band, D-Influence, who were opening acts for Michael Jackson, and produced tracks for a number of prominent musicians including Shola Ama, Jay-Z and Mick Jagger.

Aside from running Ferocious Talent, Kwaten is involved in A&R in Believe Records and is part of the new wave jazz movement in Europe and London.

In July 2018, Kwaten took over from Diane Wagg as Vice-Chair of MMF UK (Music Managers Forum).

== Biography ==
=== Early years ===
Kwaten started his artistic career in the middle of the eighties at the Warminster Athenaeum as part of the school band Outcry. He spent the next few years learning his trade in many different bands. One of these bands, called Rebekkah, was formed with his old school friend Andrew Ross from Outcry in 1984. Rebekkah led Kwaten and Andrew to a production deal at Courtyard Studios in Oxford, where they settled for a year learning the ins and outs of the studio.

=== D–Influence (1989–1999) ===
Steve Marston was a session saxophone player. Rebekkah used Steve for a session and it was then that Kwaten's friendship with Steve Marston started. Kwaten had started working at the Borderline Club in London as a compère employed by Neil Conti of Prefab Sprout and Raye Cosbert when he and Steve formed the band D-Influence with Ed Baden Powell, Sarah Anne Webb and Ned Bigham (who was to leave the band after the release of the first album). D–Influence had taken their demos to record labels without any luck and so they decided to release their own music independently. The first of these recordings was I'm the One which they sold straight to record stores themselves out of the back of a van. Kwaten gave one of these records to London DJ Tim Westwood and it was he who played D–Influence first on Capital Radio. A record deal with Acid Jazz Records followed.

D–Influence then signed to Atlantic Records and began recording their album Good 4 We. Their early support had mostly been through new London pirate station Kiss FM. There was no national radio airplay for music from the Acid Jazz scene at the time. This meant that the only way D–Influence could reach a fan base was through live music. So D–Influence toured for some time getting their break being offered the support slot on the Michael Jackson Dangerous Tour. This change in fortune led to many American acts requesting them as a support act. Michael Jackson, En Vogue, Prince, Naughty By Nature, James Brown all had D–Influence as an opening act. The band also played for Björk on her Debut album performance on Later ... With Jools Holland.

=== Production (1992–2001) ===
With no huge hit but a large live following D–Influence own productions started to gain notoriety amongst other musicians and labels. After the release of their self-produced album Good 4 We, they started productions and remixes for artists such as Mick Jagger from The Rolling Stones, Seal, Jay-Z, Tom Jones, Beverley Knight, Lighthouse Family, Changing Faces or Daryl Hall of Hall & Oates.

=== Shola Ama (1995–2002) ===
Shola Ama was the discovery that broke D–Influence as mainstream producers. Kwaten was refused a cab at Hammersmith Station so he turned and walked in to catch a train. There he heard Shola Ama humming as she walked. He auditioned her on the platform and gave her his business card. She soon became a regular at D–Influence Studios where her first album Much Love was recorded. Shola was signed to D–Influence Productions own label, Freakstreet and licensed to Warner Bros in 1995–1996. Her first album, Much Love (1997), went on to sell more than a million copies worldwide. Although not as popular in the UK, her second album In Return, also produced by D–Influence, went on to break airplay records in France.

=== Urban music seminar (1997–2004) ===
Kwaten was the founder of the biggest European Urban Music Seminar. The seminar was set up to pass on much of what he and many others had learnt about the music business as they saw it. It was, as Kwaten describes it, a "harsh no frills edutainment spectacle" whose numbers swelled from 500 people in 1998 to 15 000 over two days at the Royal Festival Hall in 2004. Many stars from the music world spoke and gave free advice at these events such as Kanye West, Jazzie B, Tim Westwood, Kanya King, Trevor Nelson, Damon Dash, Mathew Knowles, Norman Jay.

=== Mentoring and lecturing (2002–present) ===
Kwaten was a carer for The Adolescent and Children's Trust and also does charity workshops for YESS, a London charity that dispenses educational advice for inner-city children. He also uses his music industry experience to teach music students as a lecturer at various institutions around London including the University of Westminster. One of his earlier mentees, Spitfire Audio CEO, Will Evans, has credited Kwaten as an enormous help in the early stages of his career development.

In 2020, Kwaten joined Point Blank Music School as Head of A&R. He provides 1-2-1 meetings with the students, discussing topics ranging from career advice all the way to music feedback. About his role, Kwaten says: "It's an exciting role that sees me blend two of my passions. Firstly, discovering new talent and, secondly, mentoring some of Point Blank Music School's top students.”

In late-2020, Kwaten started mentoring for Cre8ing Vision's new Ultimate Circle ⭕️ programme. According to Music Business Worldwide, "The new program is designed to help break down barriers and provide young people with the relevant knowledge and advice needed to get started in the music industry. A round table of music influencers and experienced music executives will be invited to join The Ultimate Music Circle to dedicate their time to mentor young people for an agreed duration of time."

=== Artist management (2006–present) ===
In 2006, Kwaten joined ATC Management, where he managed Laura Mvula, The Night VI, Steve Brown, Shannon Saunders and Kerry Leatham.

In 2010, Kwaten established Cre8ing Vision together with Andrea Euell and Nicola Charles. Since its conception, the three co-directors have been running an annual music business seminar, The Ultimate Seminar, that calls on both rising and established musicians and influential industry professionals to talk about the local music business and their individual journeys and struggles. It enables students to network with like-minded people and has called upon acts such as Kanye West, Stormzy and Darcus Beese from Island Records among others.

Cre8ing Vision has also started different verticals such as The Music Business On Lock Show – or The MBOL Show, Music Surgery, A&R Focus Groups and The Ultimate Circle ⭕️. Launched in early 2020, The MBOL Show is a flagship Instagram Live show that delves into the lives of Music Business executives and answers questions in real-time to a worldwide online audience.

Music Surgery consists of workshops held at key music organisations, focusing on different areas of the industry. It is a round table talk with possibly beneficial information and insight.

The A&R Focus Groups aims to help those wanting to embark on a career in A&R and Music Management.

The Ultimate Circle was created after a noticeable lack of mentoring programmes available for people wanting to break into the music business. The programme is designed to help break down barriers and open doors for employment by arming those seeking to pursue a career in music with one to one help from those already established within the business.

In 2014, Kwaten started his own management company called Ferocious Talent, where he worked with acts like Rumer. Under Ferocious Talent, she sold a million copies of her debut album, Seasons of My Soul. More recently, he has been working with acts like Amrit Kaur, Vivienne Chi, Kaidi & NK-OK, Blue Lab Beats and Caitlyn Scarlett. He also acts as an international consultant and manages and advises international acts, brands, actors and actresses on the music business in Europe.

Kwaten has also launched a consultancy branch under Ferocious Talent called F.A.B Consultancy where he will explain all the different options such as Ferocious Label Services where clients could release their music or have ongoing consultations - which consists of regular meetings and calls with Kwaten and his partner, Jonny Taylor.

== Awards ==
In 1995, Kwaten won the UK Black Music Best New Live Act with his band. He was also the 2006 winner of Ghanaian Entrepreneur of the Year, and in 2013, Kwame won Artiste Manager of the Year at the Live UK Music Business Awards.

== Discography ==
- D-Influence – Good 4 We (1992): Writer; Musician; Producer
- D-Influence – Prayer 4 Unity (1995): Writer; Musician; Producer
- D-Influence – London (1997): Writer; Musician; Producer
- D-Influence – D – Influence Presents D – Vas (2002): Producer

== Contributions ==
=== Albums ===
- Shola Ama – Much Love (1997): Writer; Producer
- Shola Ama – In Return (1999): Writer; Producer
- Shola Ama – Supersonic (2002): Writer; Producer; Publisher
- Heather Headley – This Is Who I Am (2002): Musician
- Louise Setara – Still Waters (2006): Executive Producer
- Louise Setara – "Gypsy Flame" (2009): Executive Producer
- Master Shortie – A D H D (2009): Executive Producer

=== Tracks ===
- Mick Jagger – Out of Focus (1992): Remixer; Recreater
- Björk – Aeroplane (1993): Live Musician on Later ... With Jools Holland
- Seal – Bring It On (1994): Musician; Programmer
- Seal – Prayer for the Dying (1994): Musician; Programmer
- Mark Morrison – Let's Get Down (1995): Remixer
- Mark Morrison – Horny (1996): Remixer
- Mark Morrison – Return of the Mack (1996): Remixer
- Changing Faces – I Got Somebody Else (1996): Remixer
- Mark Morrison – Crazy (1997): Remixer
- Lighthouse Family – Rain Cloud (1997): Remixer
- Daryl Hall – Flashbacks (1998): Cowriter; Producer
- Dru Hill – Tell Me (1998): Remixer; Musician
- Jay-Z – Wishing on a Star (1998): Remixer
- M People – Testify (1998): Remixer
- Mo Bo All Starz – Ain't No Stopping Us Now (1998): Producer
- Ultra Nate – Tracks on Critical (1998): Musician
- Diana Ross – Not Over You Yet (1999): Remixer
- Eric Benet – Why You Follow Me (1999): Remixer
- Tom Jones – Looking Out My Window (1999): Musician; Producer
- Ultra Nate – Tracks on Stranger Than Fiction (2001): Writer; Musician; Producer
- Beverley Knight – Shape of You (2002): Musician; Producer
